= Cultural impact of Madonna =

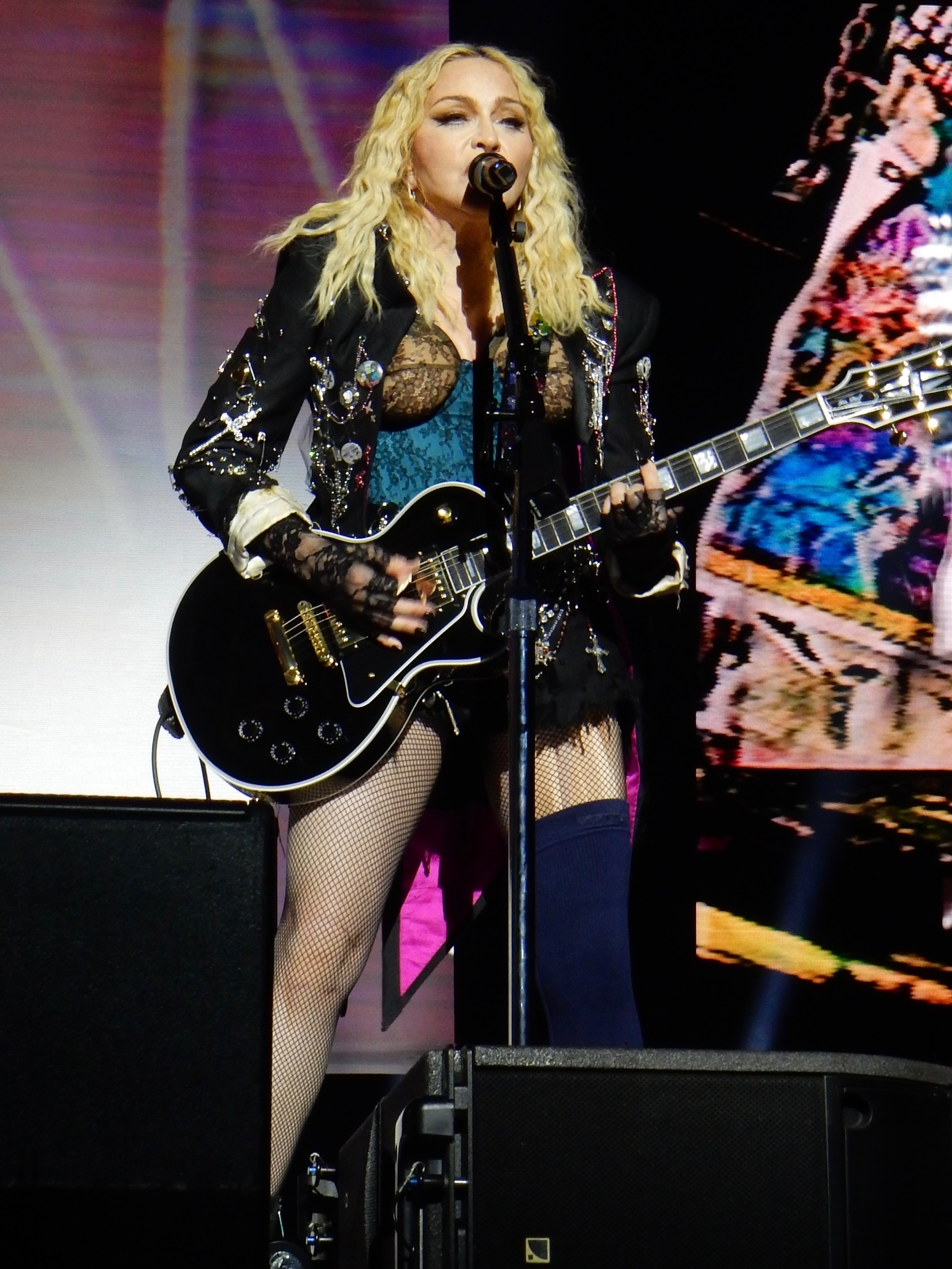
Madonna during the Celebration Tour in 2023, a tour which debuted her largest audience of her career (1.6 million in a single night) and inspired the project Todo Mundo no Rio

Madonna (born 1958) is an American singer whose socio-cultural impact has been noted by popular press and media scholars from different fields throughout the late-twentieth and early twenty-first centuries on an international scale.

Named by Time magazine as one of the most influential women of the 20th century, Madonna has been included among famous American figures by the Smithsonian, Encyclopædia Britannica and Discovery Channel. Furthermore, she has also been described by some publications as one of the most-written about figures in popular culture.

Her success led to some successive female singers being referred to as her namesake. The way she was received by media, public and academia was credited with shaping the way future generations of female singers are scrutinized, and was further credited for helping break gender barriers. Madonna's influence on other entertainers was also articulated. Her musical impact led Billboard staffers to claim that "the history of pop music can essentially be divided into two eras: pre-Madonna and post-Madonna". In her career, she amassed various world records, being recognized as the best-selling female music artist by the Guinness World Records and other industry publications. She also received various nicknames by the press, most notably the "Queen of Pop".

A complex figure, Madonna's evolving persona and work also attracted socio-cultural criticism from a variety of perspectives and approaches, which made her someone difficult to categorize, as noted by social critics like Stuart Sim. As her career advanced, Madonna's reputation fluctuated. She has faced substantial societal criticism ranging from censorship, boycotts and death threats from organizations and radicalized groups. The transcultural and globalized reach of Madonna was further conceptualized with terms such as "Madonna-economy" or the "Madonnization", drawing comparisons with that of the McDonaldization or Cocacolonization.

== Background ==
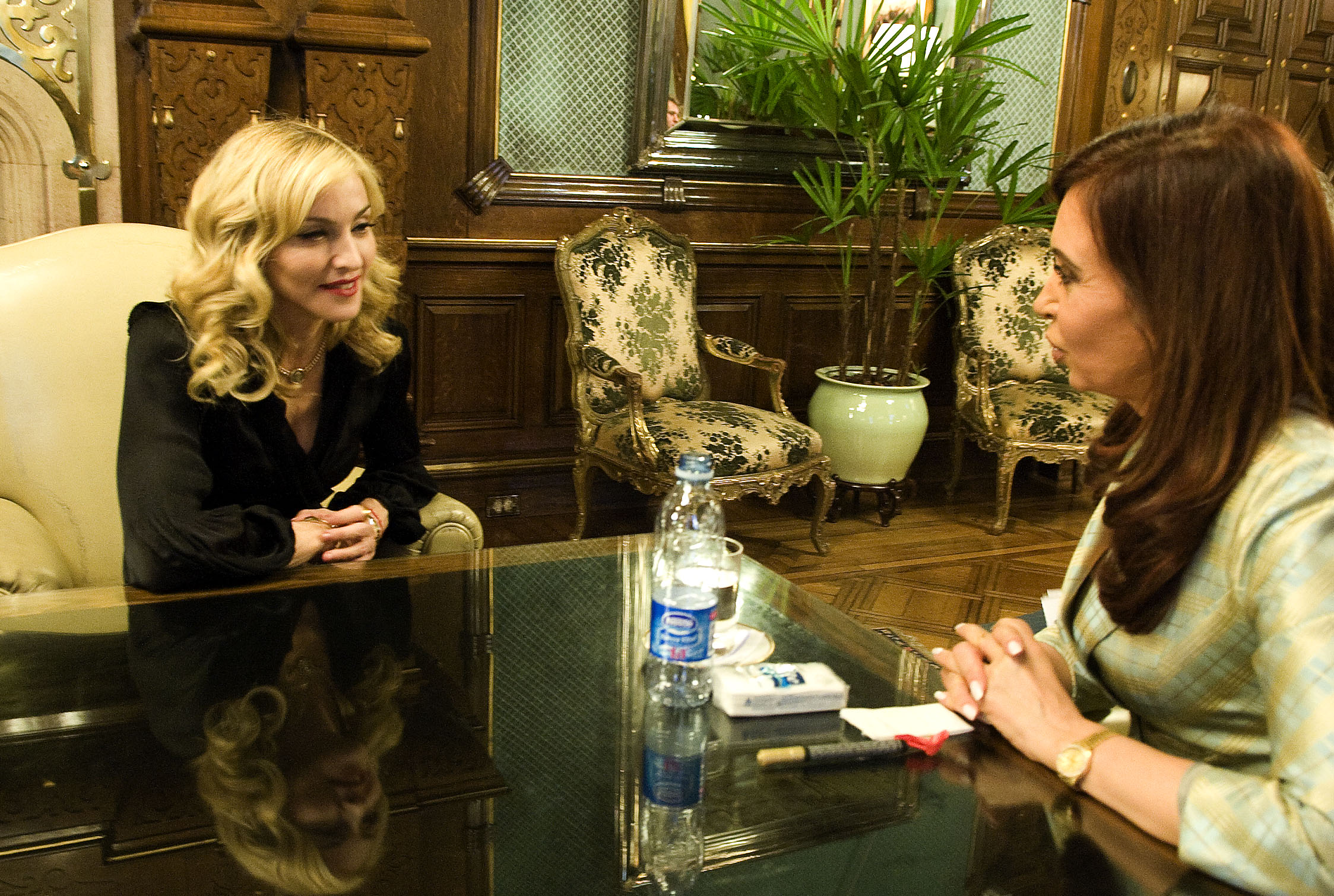
Madonna (left) and then-president of Argentina, Cristina Fernández de Kirchner (right) in 2008

Madonna is an American musician whose impact transcended music. Billboard editor-in-chief Janice Min considered her as "one of a miniscule [sic] number of super-artists whose influence and career transcended music". Similarly, Robert Sickels wrote in 100 Entertainers Who Changed America (2013), that her "music alone cannot tell the full story" of her "colossal success and influence". In a The Independent article dedicated to Madonna in 1998 discussing her figure and impact, she was described as someone who translates things into a "phenomenon" in comparison to other women performing the same tasks.

According to The New York Times in 2018, she had a "singular career" that "crossed boundaries". She reportedly pioneered a multifaceted career that encompasses many aspects of culture, according to a Singaporean publication in 2005. Robin Raven from Grammy Awards' official website wrote that "Madonna redefined what it meant to be a powerful woman in music in many ways, and has since continued to challenge sexism in the music industry and beyond."

=== Critical scope ===
Madonna has "provoked and sustained exceptional interest as a female cultural icon".

— Scholar Ramona Curry as cited in Pastiche (2001).

The subject of Madonna attracted significant commentary, both contemporaneously and retrospectively. The Romanian professor Doru Pop at Babeș-Bolyai University wrote in The Age of Promiscuity (2018) that her impact has been "extensively analyzed by many authors". She became the subject of a wide range of topics by multiple scholars from different fields. In 2018, Eduardo Viñuela, a musicologist at University of Oviedo explained that analyzing her was to delve into the evolution of various relevant aspects of society in recent decades.

Some international media publications (including El Universal and The A.V. Club) deemed Madonna as arguably the most analyzed, discussed or debated female singer since the 1950s. In 2018, Laura Craik from The Daily Telegraph claimed that she has "contributed more to the cultural conversation than any female performer in history". The Rock and Roll Hall of Fame regarded her as one of the most "well-documented figures of the modern age", while in 2023, The Cut's culture editor, Brandon Sanchez similarly referred to her as one of "the most-studied, most-written-about figures in U.S. cultural history". In 1998, feminist scholar Camille Paglia stated "I think historically people will see the enormous impact that Madonna has had around the world".

== Culture ==
According to authors of the Encyclopedia of Women in Today's World (2011), her "cultural influence has been profound and pervasive". In 2017, Billboard's Louis Virtel, described the task of defining her impact as "brutal".

=== Global ===
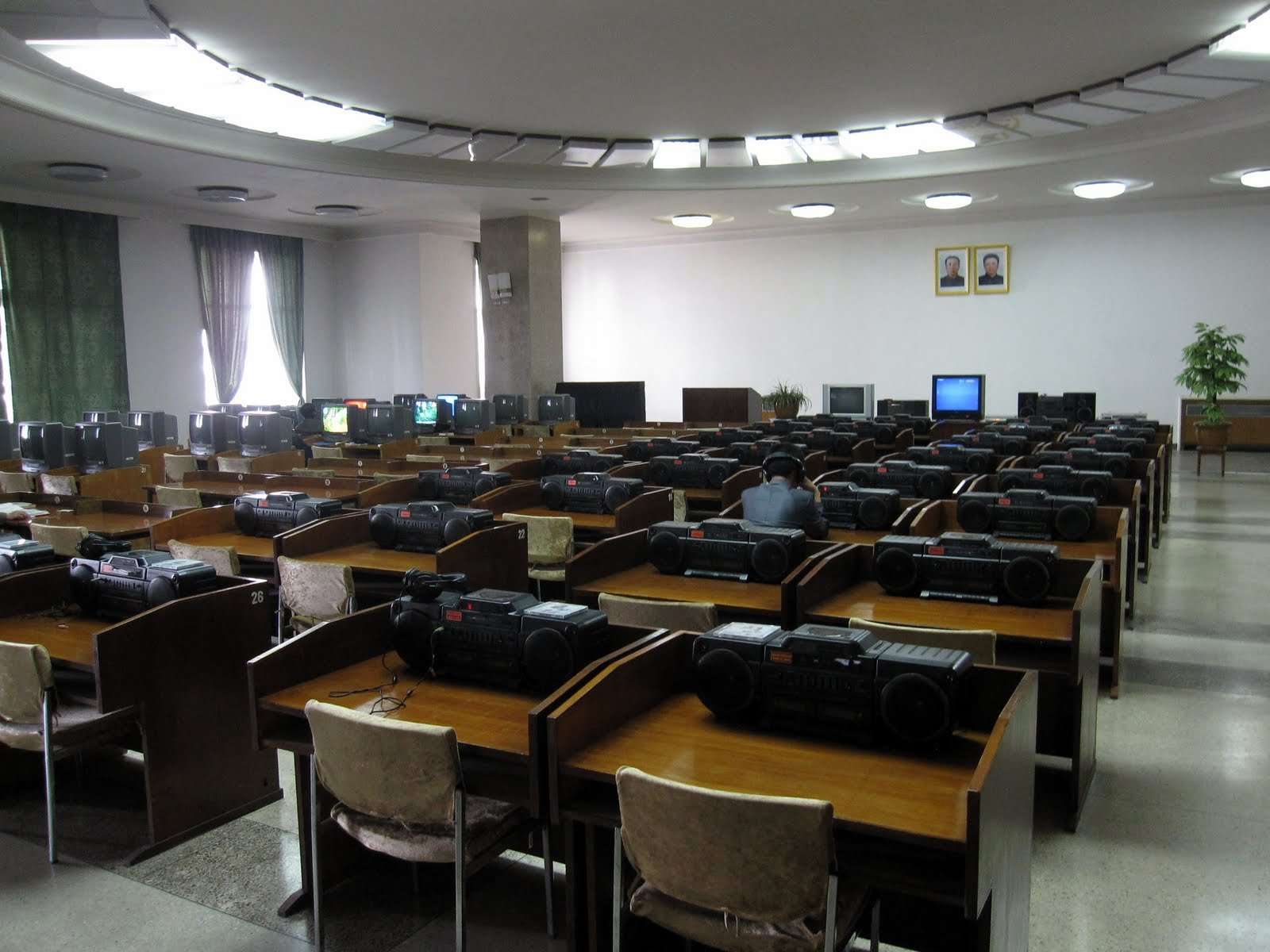
A tourist in North Korea in 2010, listening to a Madonna's song in the Grand People's Study House, North Korean's national central library

Economic scholars have claimed that Madonna's career is closely linked to the "consolidation of globalization". In 2014 scholar Jean Graham-Jones retrospectively called her "globalization's quintessential femicon". Critics also hailed her an "icon of Western society".

In 1989, Billboard wrote that Bananarama, Madonna and Michael Jackson were among the first Western musicians to have a release behind the Bamboo curtain. News agencies like United Press International also wrote in 1988 how both these artists, Madonna and Michael Jackson, were among the first popular Western musicians approved by China's government radio. Historian Mózes Csoma documented references to Madonna in North Korea, particularly in the context of their World Festival of Youth and Students in 1989, which turned out to be the country's biggest ever international event. Around 2002, Evita also became the first American film screened in the country.

In 1989, Micromanía referred to the "symbol Madonna" as the "most palpable proof that Western society advances and changes". A decade later, a political science article claimed that "the most public symbols of globalization consist of Coca-Cola, Madonna and the news on CNN". In Israel (2003), historian Efraim Karsh cites an Israeli journalist who commented: "Madonna and Big Macs: the most peripheral of examples of 'normalness' which means, amongst other things, the end of the terrible fear of everything that is foreign and strange".

=== American culture ===
Authors of American Icons (2006), said that she was long considered an icon of American identity. A marketing professor also described how she was often described as a metaphor for American society. According to historian Glen Jeansonne in A Time of Paradox: America Since 1890, she epitomized one of the cultural faces of the 1980s, along with U.S. president Ronald Reagan. Political historian and commentator, Gil Troy similarly compared how both Michael Jackson and Madonna shaped the cultural sensibility in the 1980s during the Reagan era. Biographer Gilbert B. Rodman compared her impact in the 20th-century American culture to that of Elvis Presley, and media scholars Charlotte Brunsdon and Lynn Spigel to Oprah Winfrey. Her primary contribution to U.S. culture has been musical, according to American critic Gina Arnold in 1996. She was referred to as the "high priestess of American pop culture" in the 2010s and 2020s by theater historian Catherine Schuler and Swedish media Sveriges Television. British music critic for The Guardian Kitty Empire referred to her "Michigan's biggest export since the automobile". At the end of the 20th century, Madonna appeared in the top ten of Detroit Free Press Michigan's 100 Greatest Artists and Entertainers.

=== Popular culture ===
Madonna in concerts during the 21st century
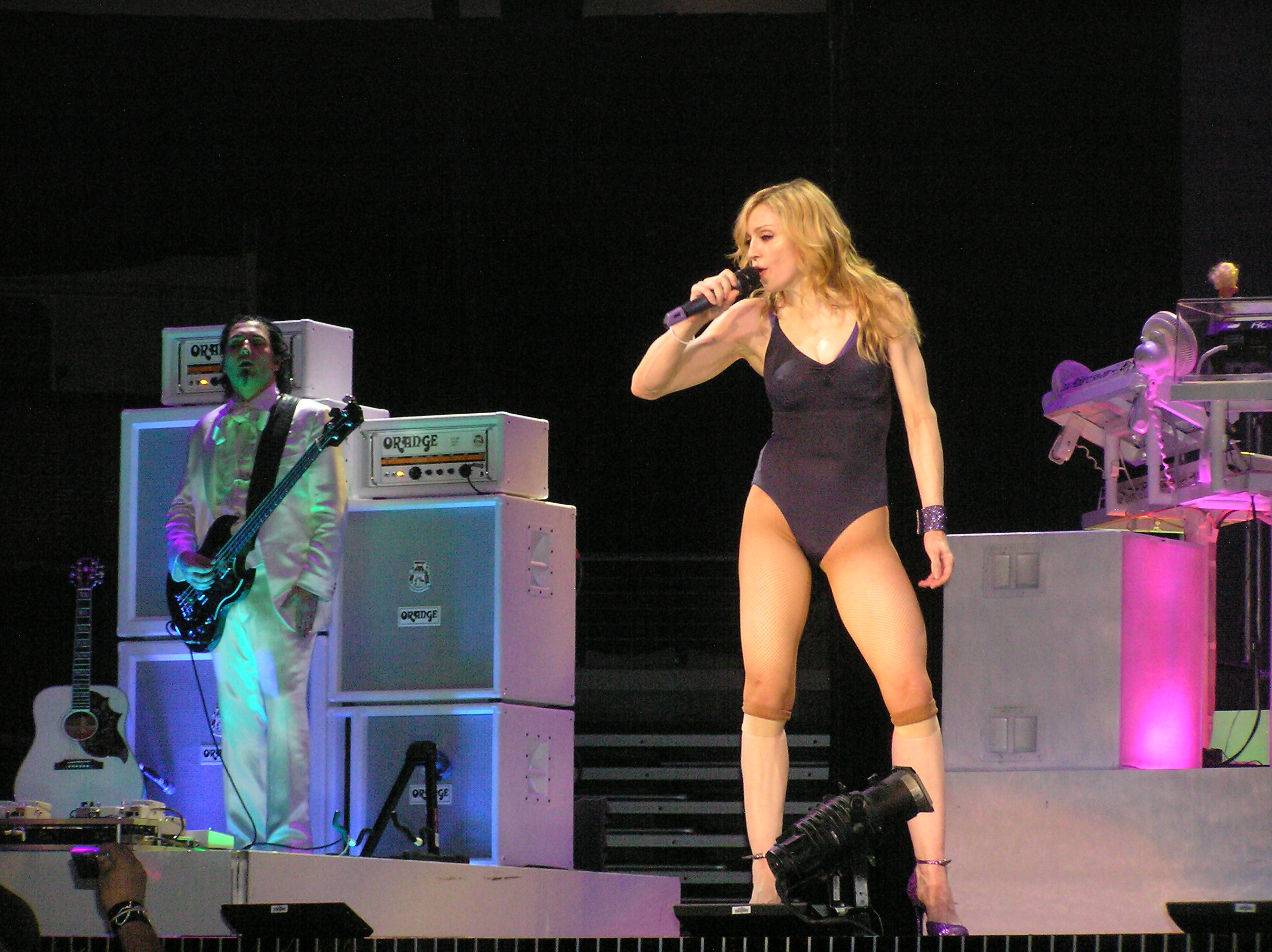
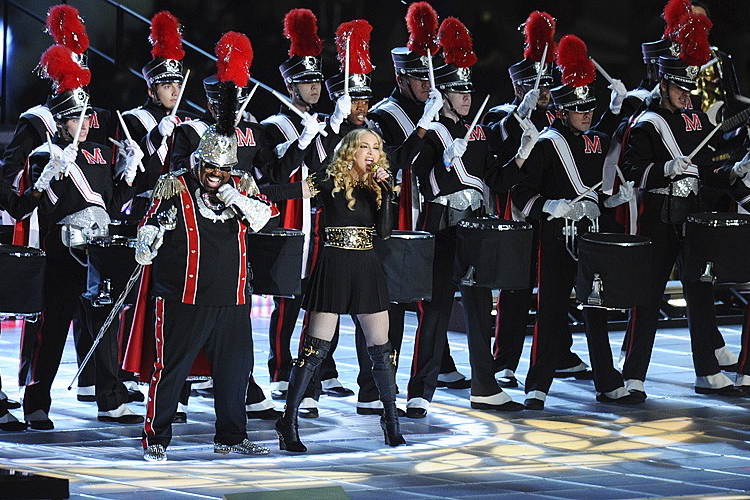
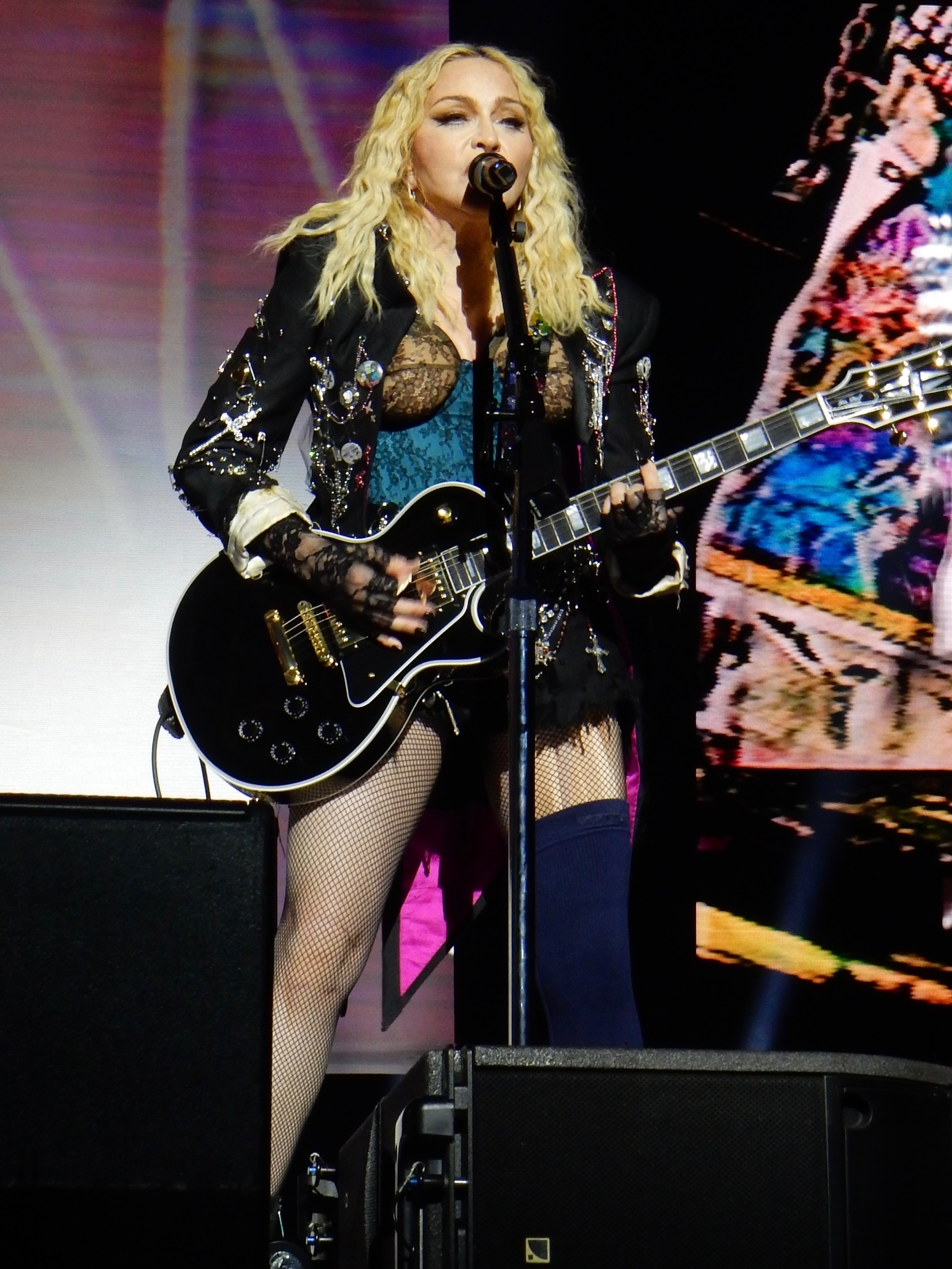
Madonna during international record-setting works/performances, from mid-2000s to early 2020s (Note: Top to bottom: During the Confessions Tour (2006), then highest-grossing female tour by that time, performing "Hung Up", also recognized by the Guinness World Records as the song topping the chart in most countries. During the Super Bowl XLVI halftime show (2012), a show that attracted then the largest TV audience for a Super Bowl half-time performance. During the Celebration Tour in 2023, a tour which debuted the largest audience for a stand-alone concert and the largest all-time crowd for a female artist, through a free concert in Brazil (2024).)

During the late twentieth century, Madonna was seen by some as a reflection of the times. Professor Marjorie Garber reflected that she perhaps "read the temper of the time" more than other entertainers. In 1995, professor Suzanna Danuta Walters explained how she circulated "constantly" in various forms of everyday life, with cultural critic Greil Marcus further saying that she was "undeniably part of our culture". American poet Jane Miller claimed that she "functione[d] as an archetype directly inside contemporary culture". At the end of the century, academic William G. Doty reflected on Madonna in Mythography (2000): "Nor can any late-twentieth-century theory satisfactorily explain" her momentary appeal. She was dubbed the reigning "queen of popular culture" or the "queen of global culture" by writers and academics Marsha Kinder and Vincent Ryan Ruggiero in the 1990s.

Madonna's impact waned at the turn of the century, but she had already left her mark, and has been retrospectively recognized by others. Commenting on her multi-decades career, The New York Times reflected in 2018 that she "made real cultural change" despite the short memory of pop culture things. In Morning in America (2013), Gil Troy said that her enduring celebrity made her a "cultural force". Others, including scholars in Ageing, Popular Culture and Contemporary Feminism (2014) and Ellis Cashmore (2022), noted how her "status as a cultural icon is acknowledged" even in her sixties. Some observers have also explored how she helped significantly change the pop culture landscape in her time. Back in 2001, Noah Robischo for Entertainment Weekly elaborated that she "defined, transcended, and redefined pop culture". In addition, Cashmore compared Madonna to other influential women of the past century like Margaret Thatcher and Rosa Parks, adding that "we can feel the effect of the changes she triggered in our everyday life".

Others claimed that Madonna transcended pop icon status and became a cultural icon. British author George Pendle noted in 2005, that she has been "consistently described as a 'cultural icon'". Kathleen Sweeney wrote in Maiden USA (2008), that some entertainers like Madonna or Marilyn Monroe, "reach a status beyond mere celebrity in public consciousness to become enduring cultural icons". In the 2010s and 2020s, author Mary Gabriel and scholar Camille Paglia deemed her as one of the "most significant figures of modern times" and a historical figure, respectively.

==== Other areas ====
According to cultural organization MiratecArts in 2009, her impact even extended "into the subconscious world of imagination, fantasy and dreams". On the lattermost point, editors of Mythic Astrology Applied (2004), commented: "Many men and women have reported Madonna appearing in their dreams. As she become a living archetype in our culture, it is no wonder that this is so". Sandra Bernhard wrote in her book Confessions of a Pretty Lady (1989), "I dream about Madonna more than anyone I know (or don't know)". A decade later, in 1999, Prince dedicated an article titled An Open Letter To Madonna in which he recounts a dream related to Madonna. Andrew Morton also documented in Madonna (2001), the case of an artist dreaming about her every night for five years. Folklorist scholar Kay Turner, devoted a book titled I Dream of Madonna: Women's Dreams of the Goddess of Pop (1993), which tells the dreaming of 50 women on Madonna. The New York Social Diary dedicated a dream analysis to a Madonna dream that she related in a Vogue interview in 1996. Virtel compared her career amounts to "living mythology".

== Multiculturalism ==
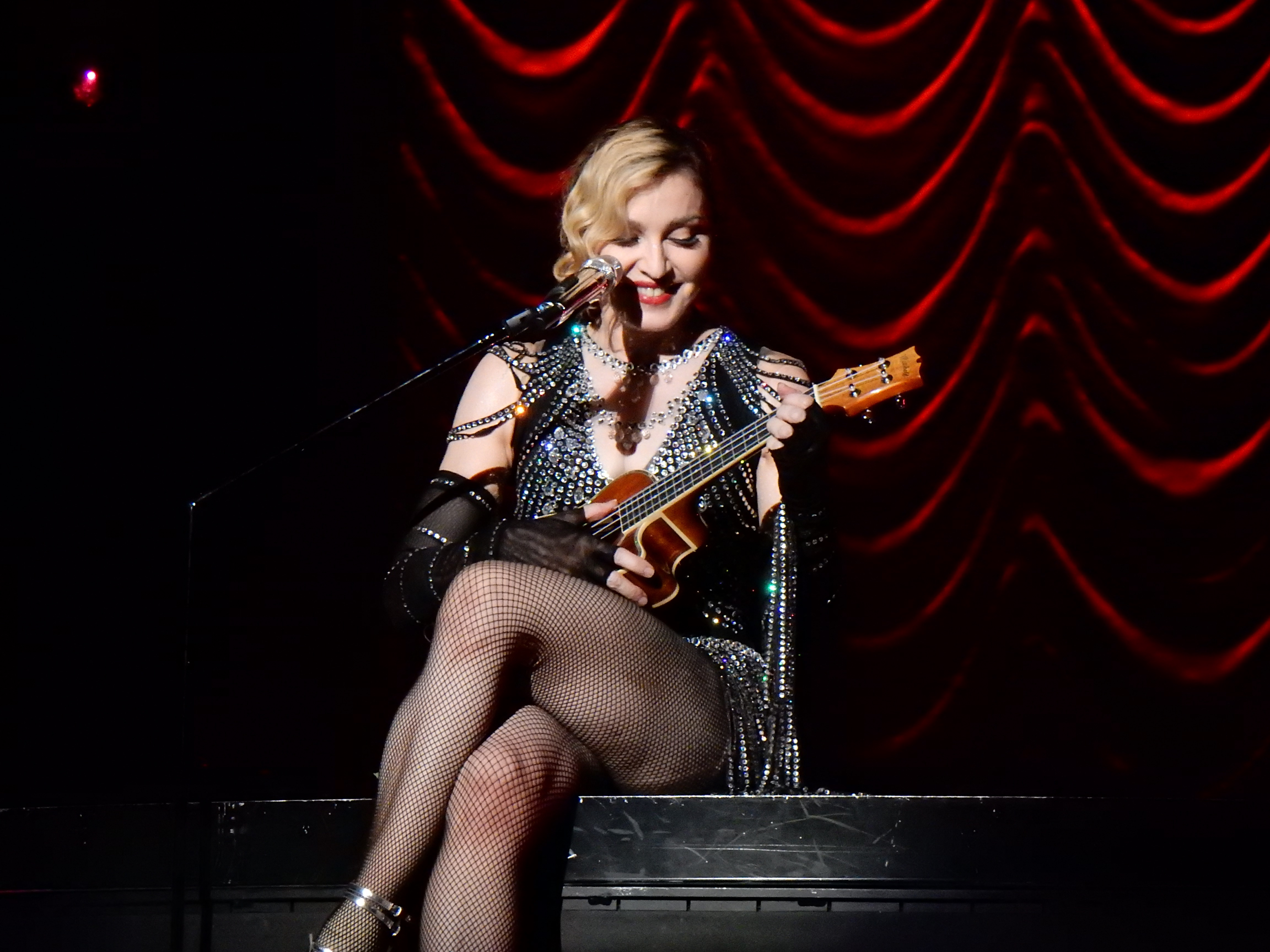
Madonna singing French song "La Vie en rose" in 2015. She has ventured to perform songs in other languages rather than English. (Note: Madonna has ventured to record/perform songs in other language rather than English, partial or fully. Examples include Spanish ("Verás" or "Lo Que Siente La Mujer"), French ("La Vie en rose" or "Je t'aime... moi non plus"), Portuguese ("Faz Gostoso" or "Fado Pechincha"), Sanskrit ("Shanti/Ashtangi"), Euskara ("Sagarra jo") and Italian ("La bambola"))

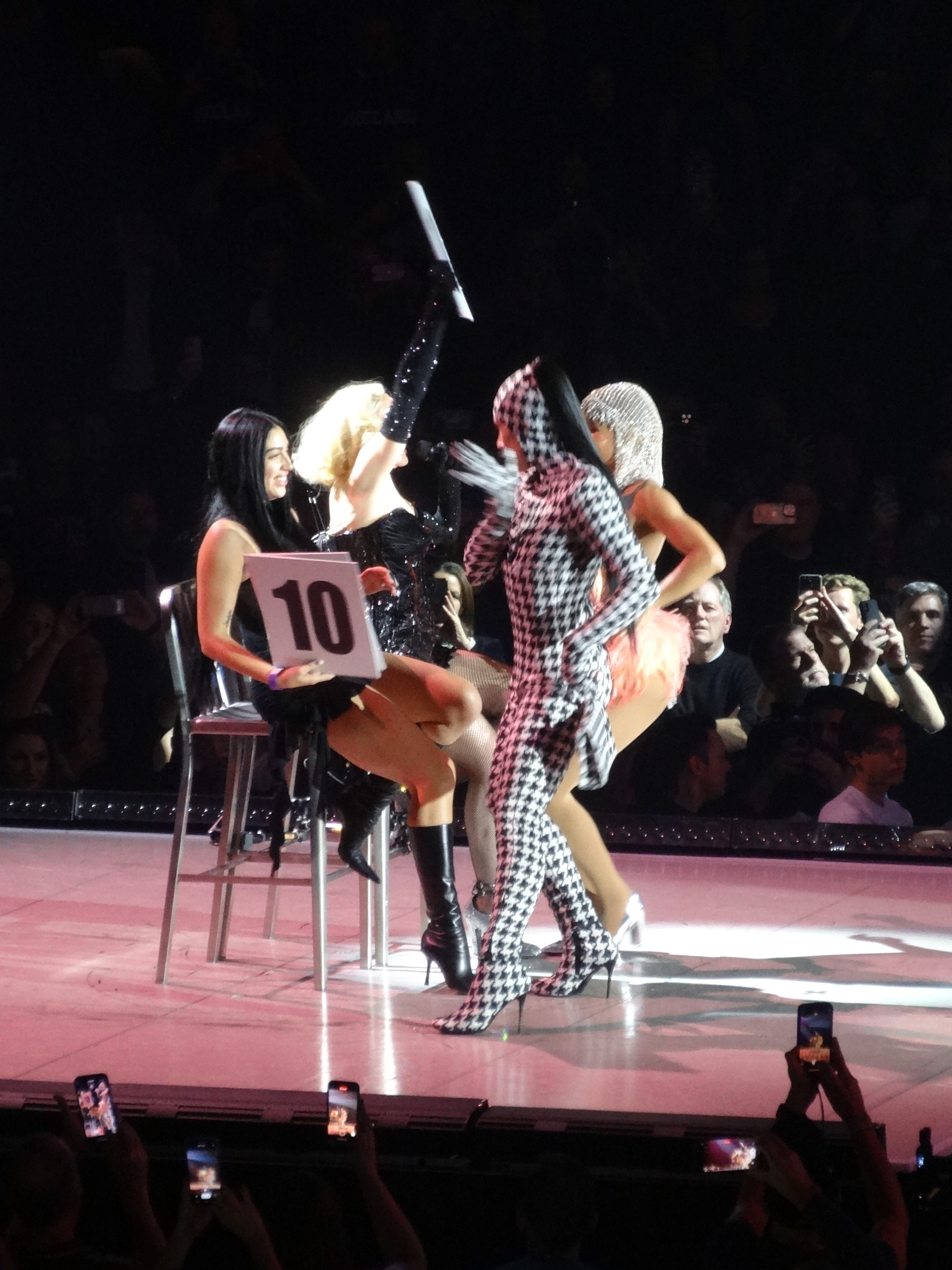
Madonna's daughter Lourdes Leon and Madonna (on the chairs) during the Celebration Tour. She has a multiracial family.

Madonna's career was significantly measured through perspectives of race and multiculturalism, through her relationships and works. In 2018, National Geographic Society noticed the media attention from various sectors on Madonna's cultural influences. The Encyclopedia of Women in Today's World (2011) even considered her a "critical nexus of race", and Australasian Gay & Lesbian Law Journal described "it is not possible to read/interpret Madonna without a recognition of elements such as race, class [and] ethnicity", present in "almost" all around her. In addition, Bowling Green State University's Matthew Donahue said that she blend diverse styles in her body of work, which include world music. In 2012, American music critic Ann Powers complimented Madonna's inclusivity and cultural diversity both in her life and work.

Madonna explained her cultural influences in various interviews. For instance, she referred about Latin culture in her life and work, saying during an interview for Canadian website Jam! in 1996, "I've always been very attracted and intrigued by Latin culture, I mean I'm half-Italian, so I suppose I'm Latin [...] I love Latin music. I love Latin men. I feel an affinity toward the Latin world". Madonna was reportedly raised in a multicultural-ethnic environment, while her father made a "very deliberate effort to introduce his children to cultures".

=== Perceptions and impact ===
Some authors and publications furthered detailed either her cultural influences, reception or impact. Madonna was a leading figure to spread Orientalist fascination, as India Today said that in the mid-1990s, it took a new and mass-marketed turn with her. Academics, including Gayatri Gopinath, Douglas Kellner or Christopher Partridge similarly explored how Madonna introduced elements of Asian cultures into the West and mainstream culture.

- Hispanics/Latin:

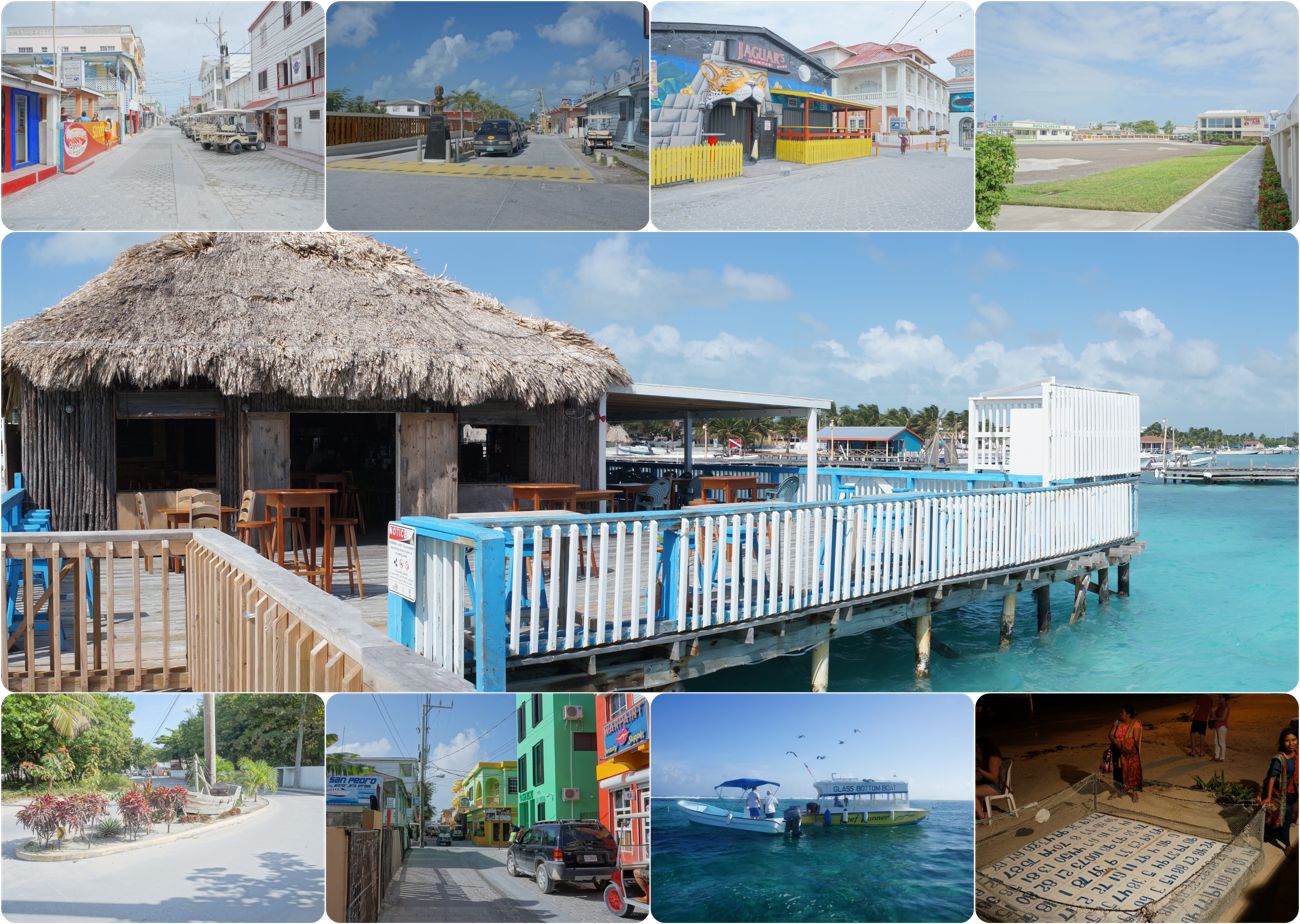
Her Latin-pop style song "La Isla Bonita" would benefit Belize's San Pedro Town tourism according to country's ministry of tourism.

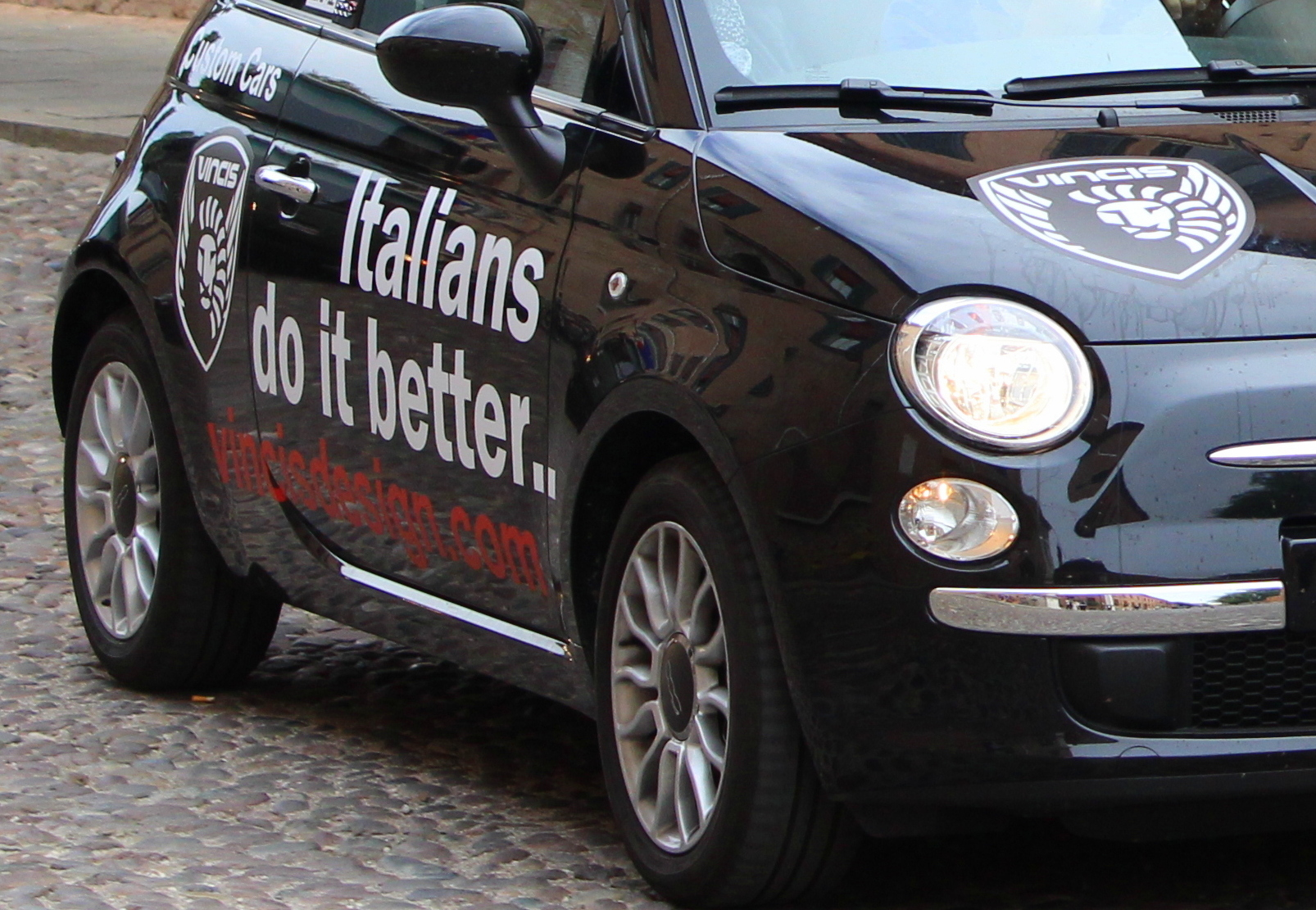
A car with the slogan, "Italians Do It Better", a phrase that Madonna debuted in her video of "Papa Don't Preach" (1986)

Professor Santiago Fouz-Hernández, considered Hispanic/Latin as "perhaps the most influential and revisited 'ethnic' style in her work". In Boricua Pop (2004), Frances Negrón-Muntaner largely explored Madonna's impact and relationship with both Boricuas and Hispanic culture in late twentieth-century American culture, saying "Madonna's nod created the illusion of insider status for Latinos of all sexualities in U.S. culture". She also detailed how Madonna became the "first white pop star to make Boricuas the over object of her affections", believing that she produced a "queer juncture for Puerto Ricans representation in popular culture", and making Boricua men desirable to an "unprecedented degree (and through) mass culture". Like Negrón-Muntaner, reviewers such as Carlos Pabón in De Albizu a Madonna (1995) and Carmen R. Lugo-Lugo in The Madonna Experience (2001) would discuss her impact or societal reception in Puerto Rican society of the 20th century. Overall, Sal Cinquemani from Billboard said in 2019, that she has been "fervently embraced by Latin audiences over the years". Indeed, scholars like Fouz-Hernández would call her a precursor of the so-called "Latino boom" started in the 1990s with various American pop singers, due to her constant references to Latino community.

- Italianness:

As an Italian American, in The Italian American Heritage (1998), authors said she served as a "vehicle for the expression of many of the qualities that are exclusive not only to Italian" but to Italian Americans. In Feeling Italian (2005), Thomas Ferraro extensively analyzed her Italianness feeling that she has consistently talked about her background. An independent record label Italians Do It Better was named after Madonna's phrase on a T-shirt display in the video of "Papa Don't Preach" (1986). In Colored White (2003), historian David Roediger called her as the most popular United States Italian American entertainer of our time", and author of The European American Experience (2010), called both Madonna and Lady Gaga the most famous examples of the Italian American musical tradition in modern times.

- Other ethnicities/cultures:
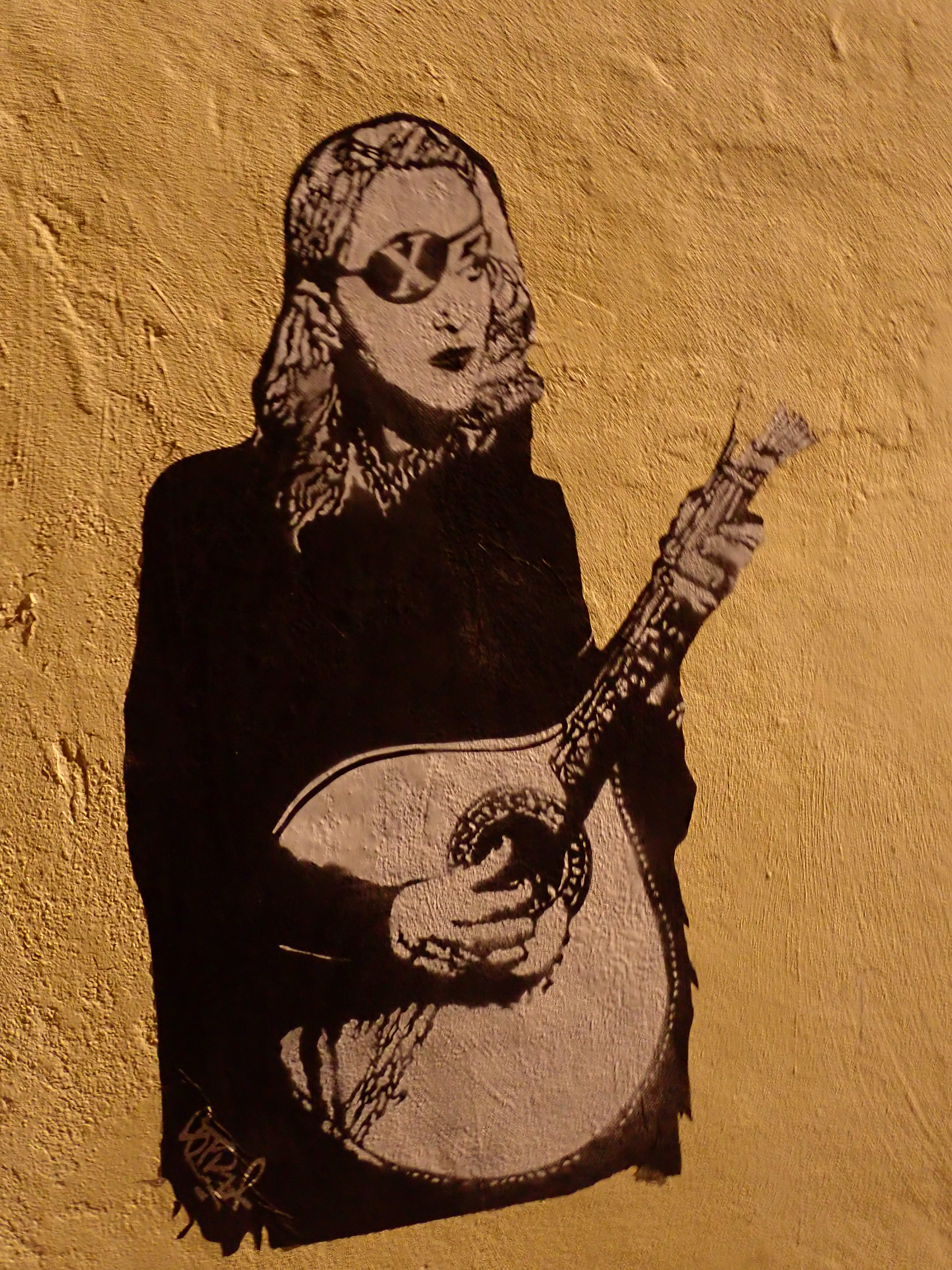
Graffitis of Madonna in Europe, France and Portugal, respectively

Scholar José I. Prieto‐Arranz, wrote in The Journal of Popular Culture (2012) that various critics agreed that rather than "export American music", she imported new and mostly European trends into her country. Some like Fouz-Hernández found also influence of England heritage in her work, particularly when she was living in the United Kingdom, but said that her exploration of "intra-Caucasian identities" has received "little academic attention".

Mostly during the height of her career in the late-twentieth century, Madonna's cultural perception among American Black culture found also a significant reception, including criticisms. Some like Mary Cross recall how she was subtly marketed as if she were a Black singer before her face was revealed to the public in her early career. A 1990 article from CineAction! referred that her "'blackness' is a common, though poorly articulated theme of popular press literature". bell hooks was a vocal critic of Madonna in the 1990s, criticizing her when she declared that as a child she wanted to be Black. Her relationships were even emphasized by Ferrero, calling her the "most accomplished Italian-to-black crossover artist in history", saying she was the "white pop star ever owing more to black male producers" as she spent more than other diva, "more time on camera and off with men of color, professionally and romantically".

=== Representations ===
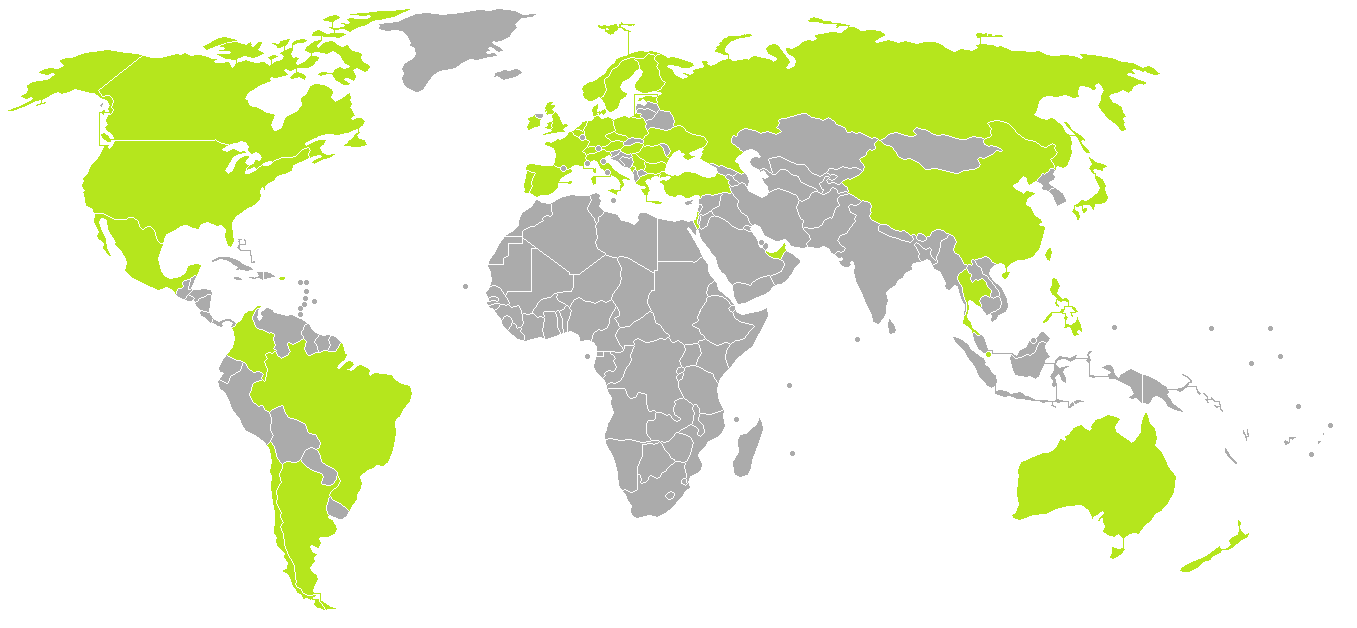
A world map showing countries where Madonna has performed (2021)

Details magazine referred to her as "Queen of Cultural Juice" in 2004. Frances Negrón-Muntaner called her "last century's American transcultural dominatrix". Professor George J. Leonard called her "the last ethnic and first postethnic diva".

BBC Four broadcast the documentary There's Only One Madonna (2020) which charts "Britain's relationship with Madonna", "examining the influence" she has had "on British music and fashion". In 2022, France 5 broadcast the documentary In France with Madonna, exploring her connectivity with the country. Newspapers including, El País documented Madonna's relationship with Spain, South China Morning Post with Hong Kong, and Clarín with Argentina. With the later country, La Nación commented she achieved great milestones during her career in the country.

== Contradictory perspectives ==
=== Scope of criticism ===
Madonna has been equally criticized from different and varied perspectives, making her a subject of social and moral criticism.

Overall, social critic Stuart Sim asserts in The Routledge Companion to Postmodernism (2001) that she "attained the status of cultural icon". However, he also described her as "extremely problematic one" because depending on one's point of view, leading him to conclude she is an icon "exceedingly difficult to categorize". In 2019, Matthew Jacob from HuffPost reflected that "it's hard to think" of any star with "as many singular achievements and such a durable place in Western media who provokes so much ire and indifference".

=== Social and cultural criticism ===
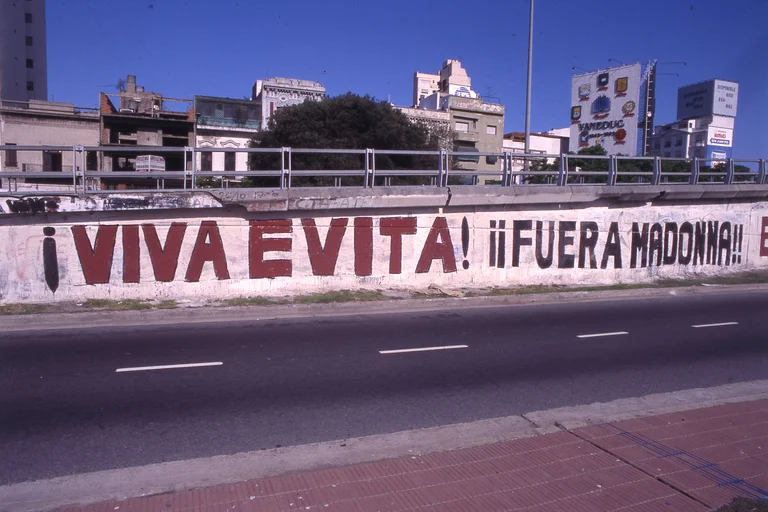
"Long live Evita, out with Madonna" denotes the initial backlash she faced mostly among peronistas during the announce and filming of Evita (1996) in Argentina.

In 2018, The New York Times staffers dedicated an article to her impact in which they also denoted she "caused a few cultural crises". Mary Cross, in Madonna: A Biography (2007), wrote she has been considered for some a "corrupting influence". Educator John R. Silber even placed Madonna in the same category of Adolf Hitler and Saddam Hussein.

Madonna garnered significant criticism and generated debate from racial perspectives. On the issue, Jaap Kooijman from University of Amsterdam said in 2017 that she "provided a challenge views on racial perspectives". In 1997, Canadian scholar Karlene Faith wrote that her mixed cultural diversity in her works, offended many opposing sexism, racism or classism. Scholar Douglas Kellner noted she was particularly criticized by Black critics. In early 1990s, for example, bell hooks problematized Madonna as a "cultural icon", calling her "dangerous" and the "Italian girl wanting to be black". In her view Madonna never articulates the "cultural debt she owes to black females". Barbadian-British historian Andrea Stuart, believes she "deliberately affected black style to attract a wider audience".

Other criticisms were rooted within the cultural appropriation discourse, being labeled as the "Queen of Cultural Appropriation" by Richard Appignanesi and David Garratt in 2010. British professor Yvonne Tasker said that "her appropriation does at times work to question assumptions". In Representing Gender in Cultures (2004), scholars referred that her "privileged position and her status as a powerful icon do little to improve the problems of minorities from which she borrows". According to Australian magazine The Music in 2019, she has been called a "culture vulture". Editors such as Maura Johnston dedicated lengthy articles discussing in their views how she "stole" ideas. Professor Mita Banerjee in Global Fragments: (dis)orientation in the New World Order (2007), even explored the idea if Madonna was "the beginning or the end of Western civilization as we know it" in which she analyzes Madonna "borrowing" aesthetics of Indo-Chic.

In addition, in Women and the Media: Diverse Perspectives (2005), authors wrote that Madonna challenged the American value system, and continued to challenge it. In Madonnaland (2016), musician-turned writer Alina Simone explored aspects of how Madonna's hometown Bay City, Michigan reception and their refusal to have a commemoration sign about her.

=== Wide perspectives ===
Some other criticism toward Madonna came from broad issues made by her critics in which she was sometimes placed front and center. This include criticism of globalization and interchangeable topics. Commenting overall on the issue in Articulating The Global And The Local: Globalization And Cultural Studies, professor Ann Cvetkovich said that "global phenomenon[s] like Madonna" can be "articulated in highly contradictory ways". Retrospectively, she was called a hyperglobalist, in the likes of McDonald's. Some coined terms which includes:

- Madonna-economy: Defined at the 1993 International Federation for Information Processing held in Namur, Belgium, under the concept of global cultural industry as "risks to become an aggressive and arrogant phenomenon", for example by imposing the transformation of all cultural activities into "cultural goods". Conversely, the Group of Lisbon, an international consortium of 19 scholars from different disciplines, (Note: Integrated by public spearks and scholars such as Gianfranco Dioguardi, Pierre-Marc Johnson, Terry Karl and Robert McCormick Adams Jr. to Daniel Latouche, Riccardo Petrella, Saskia Sassen and Joel Serrão among others.) described it as a "process that is unifying (essentially by homogenization) the consumption of information and communication goods" in the same way Coca-Cola did. German scholar Frank Sowa from Technische Hochschule Nürnberg lumped the term with others such as McDonaldization, McWorld and the Cocacolonization.
- Madonnization: Economist Tyler Cowen from Forbes used the term in the context of the performing arts as a "homogeneous global culture of the 'least common denominator'". French academic Georges-Claude Guilbert, notes that in a postmodern context the definition would not be derogatory, arguing that "there seems to be some sort of equation between the McDonaldization of American and its "Madonnanization".

Many worry that a homogenized and Americanized global culture is destroying local traditions and religious customs. The invasion of Western icons irritates those who regard McDonald's restaurants and Madonna's music as affronts to their culture and religion.

— An Introduction to World Politics: Conflict and Consensus on a Small Planet (2012).

Madonna also faced significant anti-sentiments sometimes with remarks from Anti-Americanism or Anti-Western sentiments by other critics. During the height of her career, in the 20th-century, she was prominently mentioned along with other major symbols and figures. Examples include an Islamic political party in Pakistan, who "unsuccessfully demanded" Michael Jackson and Madonna as "cultural terrorists" for "destroying" humanity according to author Craig A. Lockard. Similarly, academic Malise Ruthven cites a Pakistani religious scholar who called both singers as "torchbearers of American society with their cultural and social values", while French sociologist Bruno Étienne reacted with "horror" for both singers and their "ghettozoided" politics, as "the means by which values are transmitted in such society". Then president of Israel, Ezer Weizman criticized the Americanization of his country, blaming "the three Ms" (Madonna, Michael Jackson and McDonald's). Similarly, Japanese artist Yasumasa Morimura depicted the singers in Psychobor 22 (1994) as his critique of the Japanese obsession with both singers, which was a palpable sign of the growing global celebrity and the "Westernization" of East Asian culture as reported author Christopher R. Smit. On the other hand, German author Josef Joffe included Madonna as an example of U.S. soft power in his article for The New York Times titled "The Perils of Soft Power" in 2006. Other authors reported a rejection of some cultural groups to Madonna, in his case, Middle East scholar Patrick Clawson with Iranian "radicals" in 1994.

Into the 21st century, Madonna continued to face similar reactions. In mid-2000s, political commentator Aaron Klein reported a rejection in groupings of the Middle East such as terrorists. He said that "everyone has heard of her [and] when sheikh cite samples of the U.S. attempting to pervert" they speak of Madonna. During this time of her career, media theorist Douglas Rushkoff was quoted as saying that she "brought down the Berlin Wall" in a certain sense. Similarly, a head of a British pro-North Korea group in 2016, blamed Madonna and other brands like Pepsi for the "collapse" of Soviet Union by making people listen to "the most rubbishy aspects of bourgeois imperialist pop culture". In 2012, Russian journalist Maksim Shevchenko referred to her as a "vivid symbol of everything superficial, deceitful and hateful that the West exhibits toward Russian". In 2023, news agency Ukrinform informed that a fake Madonna's video served as Russian propaganda. They explained that Russian propaganda had used her name to spread fake propaganda in the past.

Some of these cultural perspectives or anti-sentiments were leveled up against Madonna in form of censure or death threats. Scholar Alexei Yurchak explains that an "extensive list" of Western entertainers that included Madonna, Elvis Presley, Donna Summer, Michael Jackson and Pink Floyd faced censorship in the former Soviet Union, because they challenged moral views to their society. In 1987, USSR's official newspaper Pravda informed that the censorship against Madonna or Presley was lifted up, although they gone to criticize the performers. In mid-2010s, some media outlets assumed that her name along with other Western brands like Nike, Inc. were banned by the Islamic State (ISIS) for "good measure". The International Music Council also informed that ISIS classified her music and performances as haram stating that they "represent anti-Islamic values" and specified that "anyone caught listening to her music will be punished with 80 lashes".

In the mid-2000s alone, the Australian Associated Press (AAP) informed that Palestinian terrorists threatened to kill her "because she represents many things they hate about the West". Klein informed about a spokesman from Popular Resistance Committees, who was recorded as threatening, he would personally kill Madonna and also Britney Spears. In 2006, it was reported that crime bosses from Russian mafia threatened to kill her when she was on tour, assumaly for her provocative performance of "Live to Tell" during the Confessions Tour. In 2009, media reported again death threats from Muslim extremists in Israel according to Yossi Melman, and same situation occurred in Serbia according to IANS agency.

The Parental Advisory label introduced in 1990 and whose committee Parents Music Resource Center previously targeted high-profile artists such as Madonna in mid-1980s.

Scholars in Representing Gender in Cultures (2004) noted Madonna was categorized among those who denounce popular culture as an "obedient mechanism of ideology". In mid-1980s and beyond, Madonna and other high-profile artists were discussed during a moral panic among parents and conservative media for their influence on youth culture. On the issue, and with more emphasis on Madonna, director of the St. Clair College Women's Centre commented in 1985: "Madonna, like so many symbols before, provides a fantasy life for the youngster. The symbols have changed but the reality of dealing with them hasn't' changed". Organizations like Parents Music Resource Center voiced similar concerns. In 1986, New York magazine explained that Madonna and artists like Mötley Crüe, Prince, Michael Jackson, Sheena Easton, and Cyndi Lauper, were single out by members of the committee for their "destructive influence" on youth culture, highlighting their lyrical content, and equating rock music with the evils of "broken homes". Around this time of her career, Madonna herself was considered by some to be the "lowest form of popular culture" according to authors of The Madonna Connection (1993). On the other hand, philosopher Isaiah Berlin lamented the mass culture exemplified by the singer.

== Image ==
Madonna's multivalent public image also became a defining aspect of public perception about her persona, provoking both criticism and praise. On the issue, scholar John Street in Musicologist, Sociologists and Madonna (1993), remarks that her "reception" has been "devoted almost exclusively to her image and appearance" for both her critics and defenders. Similarly, her biography at the Ohio State University explains that her "image became the source of endless debate among feminist and cultural scholars". Brian Longhurst explains in Popular Music and Society (2007): "Madonna is not simply a recording artist, but an image that connects a number of different areas of culture".

=== Public persona ===
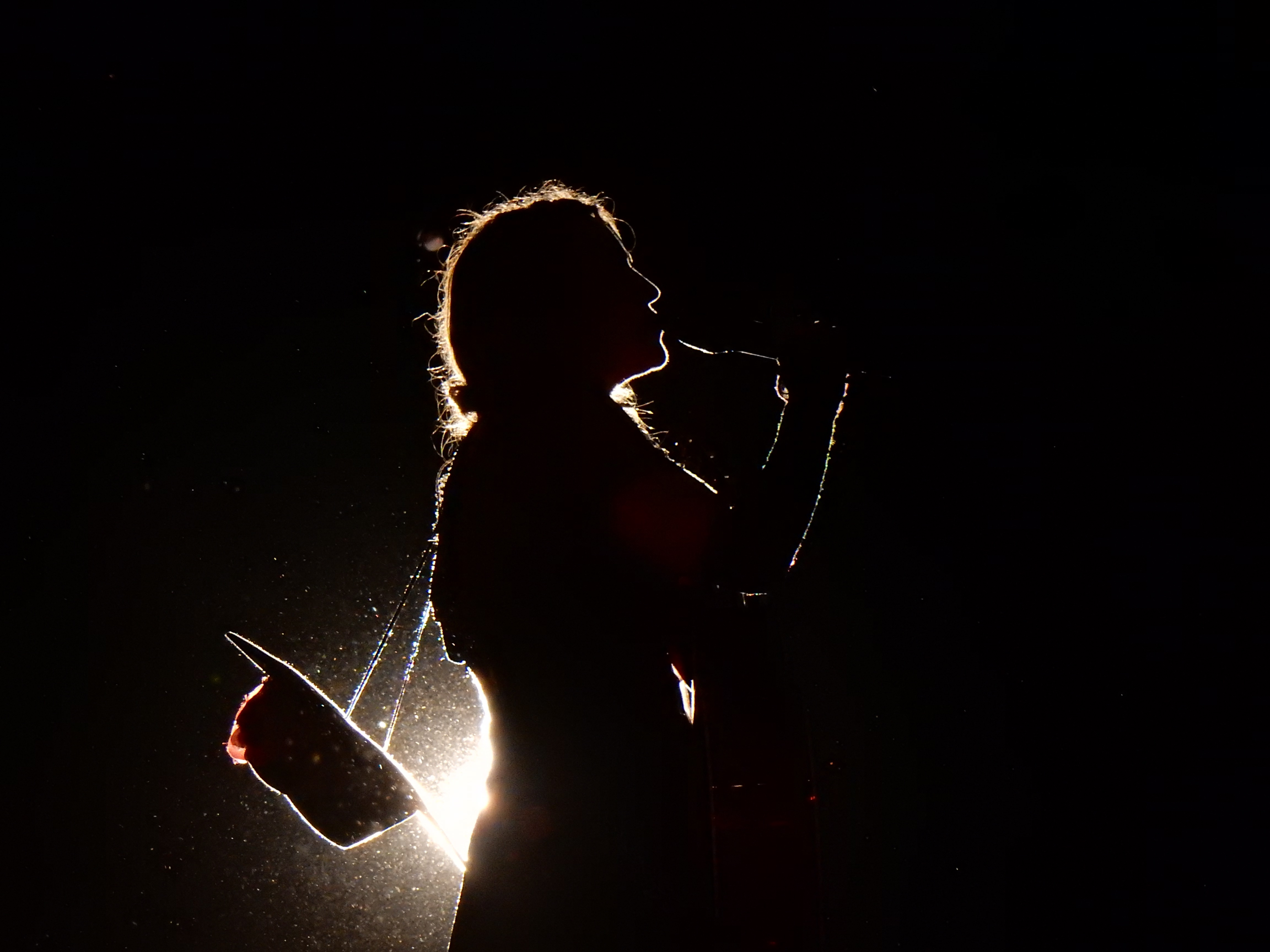
Lucy O'Brien (sic) "it has often been asked, who is the 'real' Madonna?", with many using the phrase "Who's That Girl"?

Madonna's public persona has faced scrutiny. In 2006, Swedish author Maria Wikse said that "most of her critics" recognize her ever-changing persona and it influenced the way she was "read". In American Icons (2006), professor Diane Pecknold held that her persona also contributed to the rise of the Madonna studies. In 1991, author Graham Cray from Third Way opined that she has "skilfully developed a persona" complementing her as a "complex persona and phenomenon" that requires a "detailed analysis". She was described as a woman constantly searching for a "new self", and self-actualization.

In her Madonna biography, Lucy O'Brien was critical in this aspect, saying: "I have always found her work clear and autobiographical, but her personality complex and disarmingly changeable". Dick Weissman considered her the "Queen of role reversal", but also noting that "complex analyses of her persona" are "difficult". In Popular Music: The Key Concepts (2002), lumps Madonna within general aspects of music star's changing personas (that may change across time). Despite this, British music journalist Paul Morley commented: "What made her so ahead of her time, knowing it and not knowing it, is that you can use her, colourise her, mix her, remix her, as part of your own narrative of meaning". For both her image changes and personas, author Jasmina Tešanović was overall positive, saying in 2013, "would you expect a magician to be sincere once he performs his tricks in order to marvel you? [...] I would call Madonna as one of the most honest performers in pop culture. She always showed us the dirty laundry in the pop business".

Madonna was long considered calculated with her image, Chris Smith said in 101 Albums That Changed Popular Music (2007) that it helped her reach a status of "near-legendary cultural phenomenon". Fouz-Hernández even said that a research dedicated to her in 1993, showed that her image of taking control was seen positively. To some, Madonna was labeled as "the first female" to have a "complete control" overly every aspect of her image/career. On the point, Sonya Andermahr from University of Northampton elaborated: "She exercises more power and control over the production, marketing and financial value of her image than any female icon before her". It also left a mark in her industry, although Karla Starr from Seattle Weekly said in 2008, that "the fact she is seen as the first female artist with complete control over her image [...] is now so ingrained that we forget how significant it really is".

Roger Blackwell and Tina Stephan agreed that her "personally usually overshadows her musical product". She became known more for who she is than for what she does, in the view of American author Ethan Mordden. However, Christopher Toh from Singaporean newspaper Today in 2011, defined "she's remembered for her antics outside of the recording studio as much as her ability to create some great music".

=== Reinvention ===
Reinvention is a word that defined her career and it "fuelled a boom in jargon-filled academic studies about her" said Financial Times's art critic Ludovic Hunter-Tilney. She was called a "master of the unexpected". The reputation prompted to critics of her works, like film critic Roger Ebert to describe that her changes images were quickly that she was "ahead" of her audience.

Writing for MTV in 2019, Erica Rusell said that Madonna left a long lasting influence within the concept of reinveinting her image and styles. British journalist Matt Cain even credited her for popularizing reinvention in popular music. Madonna's impact on reinvention was even seen in some business and corporations. Vanity Fair's Chris Murphy acknowledges her impact by saying she "laid the blueprint for aspiring female pop star to continue evolving [...] it wouldn't be a stretch to say Taylor Swift owes the entire concept of having various 'eras' to Madonna's legacy".

=== Appearance ===
During the height of her career, Madonna's changes introduced fresh connotations of female beauty as per was discussed by commentators. In Hollywood Songsters (2003), James Robert Parish and Michael R. Pitts said that in the likes of Marilyn Monroe and Jean Harlow, she helped create a new generation of blonde bombshell image. She introduced a concept of celebrity beauty that was "more fluid and mobile", according to authors of Icons of Beauty (2009) and it perhaps marked "the beginning of new era in celebrity beauty". Even in early 1990s, Paglia considered that her "most enduring cultural contribution may be that she has introduced ravishing visual beauty and a lush Mediterranean sensuality". To author Ken MacLeod, "Madonna's videos and live shows introduced a new physicality into female pop performance". Spaniard music critic Patricia Godes opined that Madonna was the first white Caucasian celebrity to have an athletic physique with muscular legs and shoulders and felt "it changed a little the idea of female physique".

=== Fitness ===
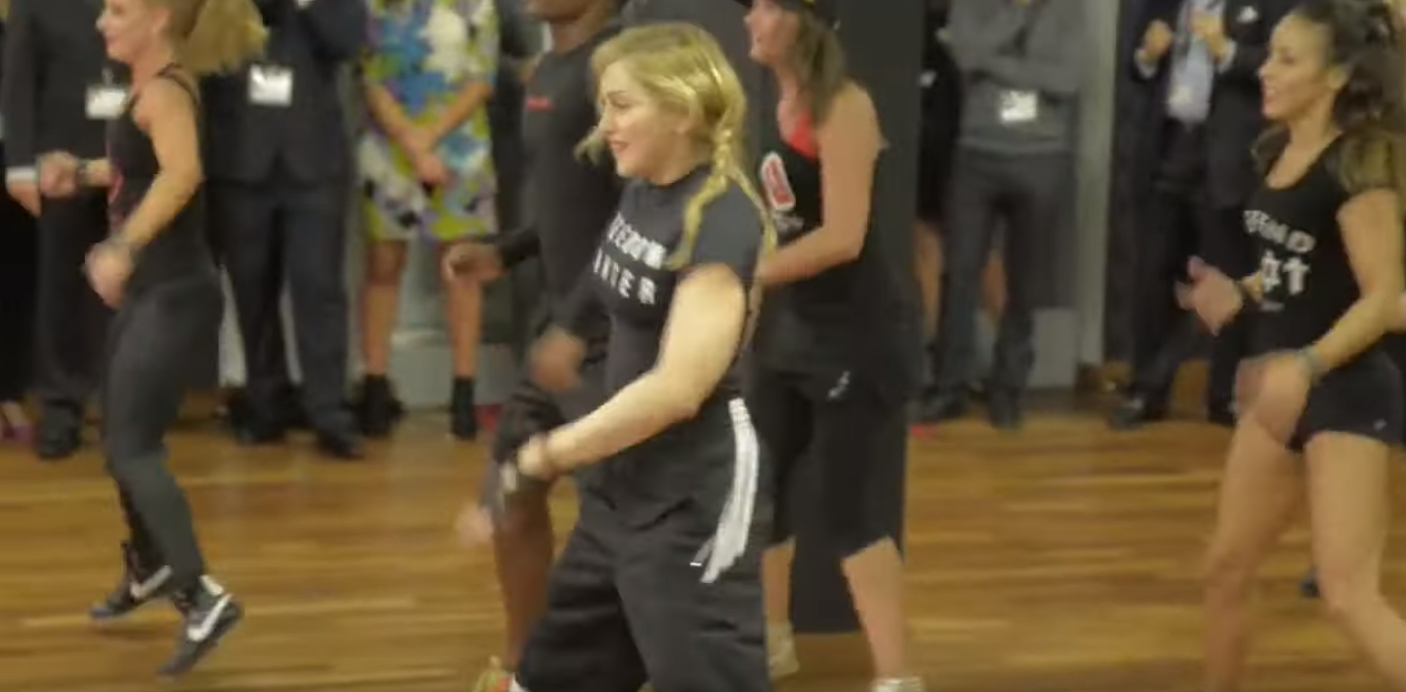
Madonna (center) during the opening of her Hard Candy Fitness in Germany, 2013

In her career, Madonna was also considered a fitness and dance icon. Although opinions differed and she received criticism, WebMD, an American medical website, made remarks about her impact in 2006. In 2020, Gulf Today reported she influenced a number of personal trainers, fitness influencers or bodybuilders from different ages. Blond Ambition World Tour's dance troupe (including Kevin Stea, Carlton Wilborn, Luis Xtravaganza Camacho and Jose Gutierez Xtravaganza), were according to Jim Farber from The New York Times in 2016, "the only dance troupe on a pop tour ever to achieve a fame of their own".

Having mentioned Madonna and Cher as one of the first celebrities to hire a personal trainer, author Pete McCall described it resulted in "the explosive growth of women starting to exercise in order to achieve the lean and fit bodies of the stars". Apple Fitness dedicated a full Madonna-devoted month in 2023 for their Pride playlist inspired in her workouts. During the same year, a trend in TikTok called "The Madonna squat" challenge became viral. Vogue's Liana Satenstein also said that Madonna "influenced the way we dress for the gym". Her wide range impact in the sector was defined by L. Fuller in Sport, Rhetoric, and Gender: Historical Perspectives and Media Representations (2006):

Perhaps the most pronounced example of a celebrity whose active body has been marketed and consumed in diverse and ambiguous ways is singer/actress Madonna, not an "athlete" per se. There are instances in the sociology of sport literature where bodies like Madonna's that transcend various popular culture genres are referred to.

=== Personal and professional relationships ===
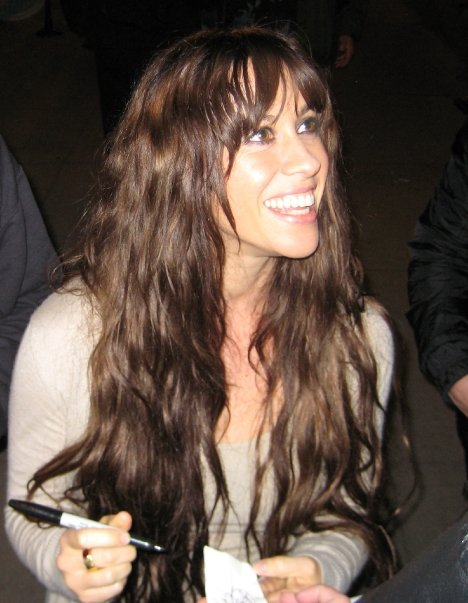
Madonna's relationships and interaction with people defined part of her public image. She also mentored others, including Alanis Morissette (pictured).

Madonna's interactions with others also became a focal point of opinions. Media referred as her protégé figures in the industry such as Nick Kamen and Guy Oseary, with the latter crediting her "with pretty much everything" in his career. Madonna reportedly mentored signed artists in her own record label Maverick Records, most notoriously Alanis Morissette, who declared to Rolling Stone in 2020, how "generous" she was as mentor.

In her early career, Madonna earned a reputation of "using" and "discarding" people of both sexes, including boyfriends and whoever could help "advance" her career, including commentaries of critics like Chris Connelly. In Desperately Seeking Madonna (1993), the author quotes Madonna saying: "If anybody wants to know, I never fucked anyone to get anywhere. [...] Yes, all my boyfriends turned out to be very helpful to my career, but that's not the only reason I stayed with them. I loved them very much". As Madonna's responses to the subject were documented, the author of Profile of Female Genius (1994), refers to "what confidence and positive perspective she has about a negative part of her career building". In his view, Spaniard music journalist Diego A. Manrique for El País in 2003, considered the "scandals" derived from the fact she never "deviated" from her goals, avoiding becoming the "puppet" of others, whether they were bedfellows or not, it would not shocked the music industry if the protagonist was a male artist.

Madonna was also subjected to commentary regarding her interactions with younger female artists. Some media referred to her matriarchy-like role, with an author noting that her "pop matriarch status" has been "atomized with exhaustive diligence" in some works. She was noted to helped create hype for relatively unknown artists, including Katy Perry. From the 2010s onwards, journalists like Chris Richards of the Washington Post criticized Madonna and her reputation of "pop matriarch". In 2012, music critic Ann Powers acknowledged her complex and sometimes controversial role, although ultimately reacted positively to her symbolic reputation naming her "Mother of Pop". In 2015, MTV dedicated an article about "9 Princesses of Pop Who Have Earned Madonna's Blessing", noting her supporting manner.

=== Age and cross-polarization ===
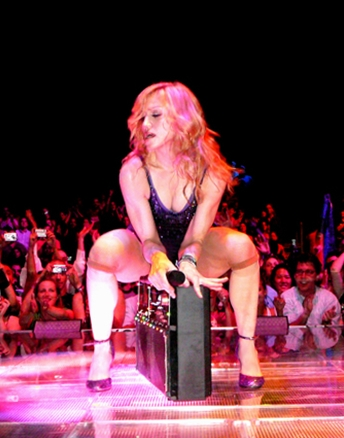
Madonna at age of 48 in 2006 performing "Hung Up". She achieved some age chart records, including being recognized by the Guinness World Records as the "Oldest artist to simultaneously top the UK singles and album charts" with "Hung Up" and Confessions on a Dance Floor.

Madonna's age has also defined her career, and on occasions generating a controversial reception and conversations related to her persona in topics like ageism. O'Briend notes she herself contributed expanding the issue with her sometimes radicalized and deliberately anti-beauty statements. In 2023, Jennifer Weiner opined retrospectively for The New York Times that every new Madonna was both a look and a commentary on looking, a statement about the artifice of beauty, saying also that whatever her intentions now, she also set conversations. Viral moments of Madonna's stage performances and appearances were sometimes attached to her age, with Maeve McDermott from USA Today compiling some of them in 2018. Nonetheless, incidents like her performance at the 2015 Brit Music Awards saw a rise of life insurance sales closely related to Madonna.

==== Timeline ====
Various commentators dedicated pieces analyzing the focus and impact on her career, with Cult MTL's Toula Drimonis saying that she was fighting ageism long before she was old. Writing for The New York Times in 2023, Mary Gabriel said that since her late 20s, in the 1980s, the press began aloud about when she might retire, but with each decade, the same question persisted with "varying degrees of cruelty". Her entrance into her 40s, according to a Belfast Telegraph columnist in 2008, was a moment that many considered "was supposed to be the end of her creativity and influence". A year prior, some media remembered a Smash Hits headline dedicated to her in 1993: "Madonna calm down grandma".

==== Views of Madonna ====
Madonna's responses to remarks on age has been varied in tones over the times along with the varied focus she faced, with Bethany Minelle from Sky News saying that her responses received "widespread media coverage". At the age of 34, in 1992, she responded to Jonathan Ross: "Is there a rule? Are people just supposed to die when they're 40?". She would later made an emphasis on aged woman in media embracing their sexuality and certain behaviours, feeling in her view when they reach a certain age, they're not allowed to behave a certain way, and that she felt responsible for opening that door. In 2018, American commentator Mary Elizabeth Williams sees it as her most radical act, the fact she being as polarizing as ever, but calling her also a pioneer.

==== Impact ====
Madonna's age also received a cultural response. Discussing her entrance in her 50s, in 2008, Australian newspaper The Age commented that it represented "big news", and "so big" to the point a virtual clock counted down to the moment she reachers her half-century, also noting: "From trashy gossip magazines to esteemed cultural institutions, the queen of pop's entrance into middle age is being chewed over, preocessed and then dissected again". Her entrance into her 60s, was defined by a member of AARP for Campaign, as a "major pop culture event", and media outlets including The Guardian, dedicated a "series" of articles celebriting that milestone, written by musicians and columnists. A hashtag #MadonnaAt60 was also used by some of her fans and celebrities. Her entrance into her 40s, was reported as a "media frenzy" resulting an increase for her record sales in the U.S. and U.K charts according to Billboard and Music Week, respectively. It also ambiguously impacted her critical and academic reception. For instance, autors of Ageing, Popular Culture and Contemporary Feminism (2014), said "she has continued to dominate recent academic debate about the role of ageing women in pop", and similarly, the authors of Gender, Age and Musical Creativity, described her as perhaps the "best known and most talked about female musician in her fifties".

== Madonna and critics ==
Correspondence between Madonna and critics have been noted, with musicologist Keith E. Clifton saying that her "stormy relationship with the critics is a well-established and crucial aspect" of her career. As her career advanced, and Madonna took more risks, becoming controversial many times, she has alienated critics; some of them at first praised her, were reportedly been "disillusioned". Other of her critics like author Jennifer Egan would retrospectively recognize positive point of views in their assessment towards Madonna, while labeling as cliché some of the criticisms. On the other hand, John E. Seery cites that her critics are "many" and some of the critical issues include: "She is not to be taken seriously [...] she is, at bottom, a joke". In Understanding Popular Music (2013), Roy Shuker said that she is a "star whom many critics [...] love to hate".

As a contested figure, correspondence among critics were also noted. Academic John Street in Musicologists, Sociologists and Madonna (1993) compared the extravagant negative reactions saying that others have "defended" her in "equally extravagant terms". Professor of marketing at University of Ulster, Stephen Brown reflected in 2003, "what people say about Madonna says more about them that it says about the singer". In Madonna as Postmodern Myth (2002), Frenchman Georges-Claude Guilbert similarly compared that some "journalists enjoy being particularly venomous when writing about Madonna", but feeling it also reveal "more about themselves than anything else".

=== Madonna's views ===
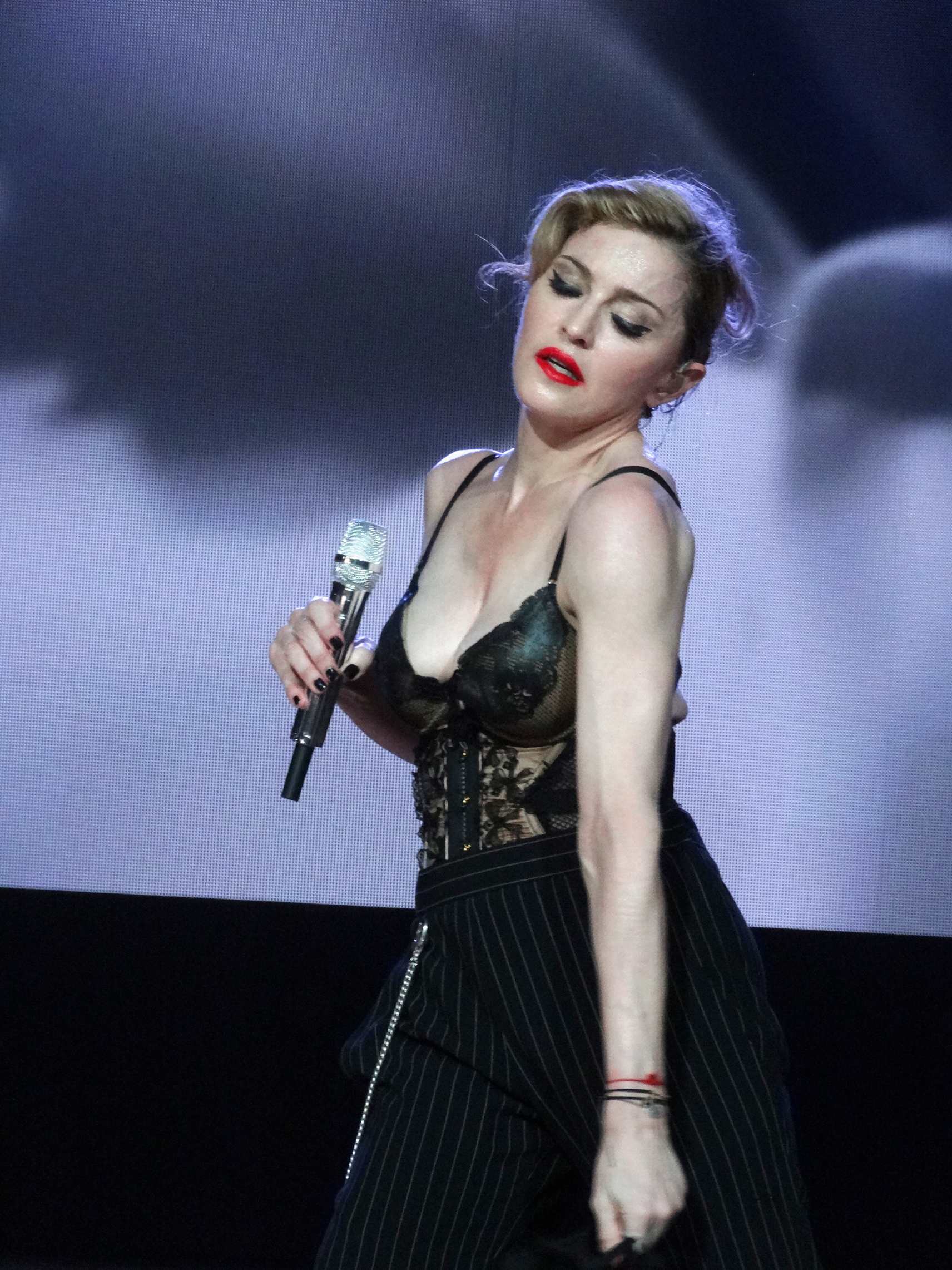
Madonna during the MDNA Tour (2012), performing "Human Nature", an answer song to her critics during her provocative releases of early 1990s

Thorught her career, she responded to her critics through her works, conduit and statements. Acknowledging her risks, she declared: "I've been popular and unpopular, successful and unsuccessful, loved and loathed and I know how meaningless it all is. Therefore, I feel free to take whatever risks I want". She has responded to punctual criticisms, including historical charges about cultural appropriation amid the release of her album Rebel Heart in 2015.

Madonna perpetuated an image of provocateur and controversialist. She acknowledges her reputation declaring: "I think it's kind of a waste of time to provoke just for the sake of provocation. I think you have to have a lesson or something that you want to share. You have to have a reason for it". She maintened her view by saying at the 2023 Grammy Awards audience that if an artist is labeled "scandalous" or "problematic" are "definitely on to something". The same year, in a devoted article to her by Vanity Fair Italia, Simone Marchetti noted Madonna as an artist "who challenged everyone", and remarks her words: "It was my destiny [...] I feel that it is a necessary part of the journey I am on and it's a price I have accepted". Prior in 2013, Rolling Stone noted an opinion piece by Madonna in Harper's Bazaar: "I like to provoke; it's in my DNA [...] But nine times out of 10, there's a reason for it".

=== Views on criticisms and on Madonna's responses ===
In 2016, scholar Deborah Jermyn noted that "numerous academic studies have considered the way Madonna polarises views". MacLeod condensed in Leaders of the Pack (2015) that "despite the criticisms, many have seen her vast contribution, lyrically, musically, and artistically to the world of popular culture".

Scholars whose dedicated works to her and remarked positive aspects on Madonna, including Douglas Kellner and E. Ann Kaplan, also remarked negative or ambiguous views in their assessment on the singer, calling her a site of contraditions, as Shuker remarks she "provides a range of contradictory readings and evaluations", while Kaplan expanded, that "together produce the divergent images in circulations". Musicologist Susan McClary, sees Madonna as engage to rewrite some Western thought.

Other reviewers have favored rethinking and other approaches. For instance, Gayle Stever in The Psychology of Celebrity (2018) noted how the "attention Madonna received from being controversial" also "opened up an entire new way of thinking" on others. "There is no avoiding Madonna, so we might as well study her", wrote Maria Gallagher for The Philadelphia Inquirer in 1992, where scholar Cindy Patton considered her a "social critic in a certain way", and that she has an "instinct for not just what's going to get people upset, but what's going to get people thinking". Similarly, during an international congress in 2005, Lydia Brugué from Universitat de Vic concluded she is an artist with "multiple messages" leading frequently to ambiguity and certainly, it "provokes" but "it goes beyond creating controversy". In addition, ahead of the release of her studio album Hard Candy in 2008, chief music critic Jon Pareles for The New York Times describes: "Since the beginning of her career she has telegraphed her intentions and labeled herself more efficiently than any observer".

In 2020, Glamour's Christopher Rosa, acknowledges her impact in the music industry, at the same notes a negative side, but feeling in his view it was "most of the time for the best". Despite having received a significant feminist reception, being both appreciated and castigated, some other reviewers also noted notable criticisms rooted within misogyny in their views, including scholar Lynne Layton in Who's That Girl? Who's That Boy? (1998). In 2008, Guy Babineau from LGBT-targeted publication Xtra Magazine, compared that "men in music, industry and politics who are much richer and more powerful, and who do much worse things, are admired".

== Cultural depictions ==
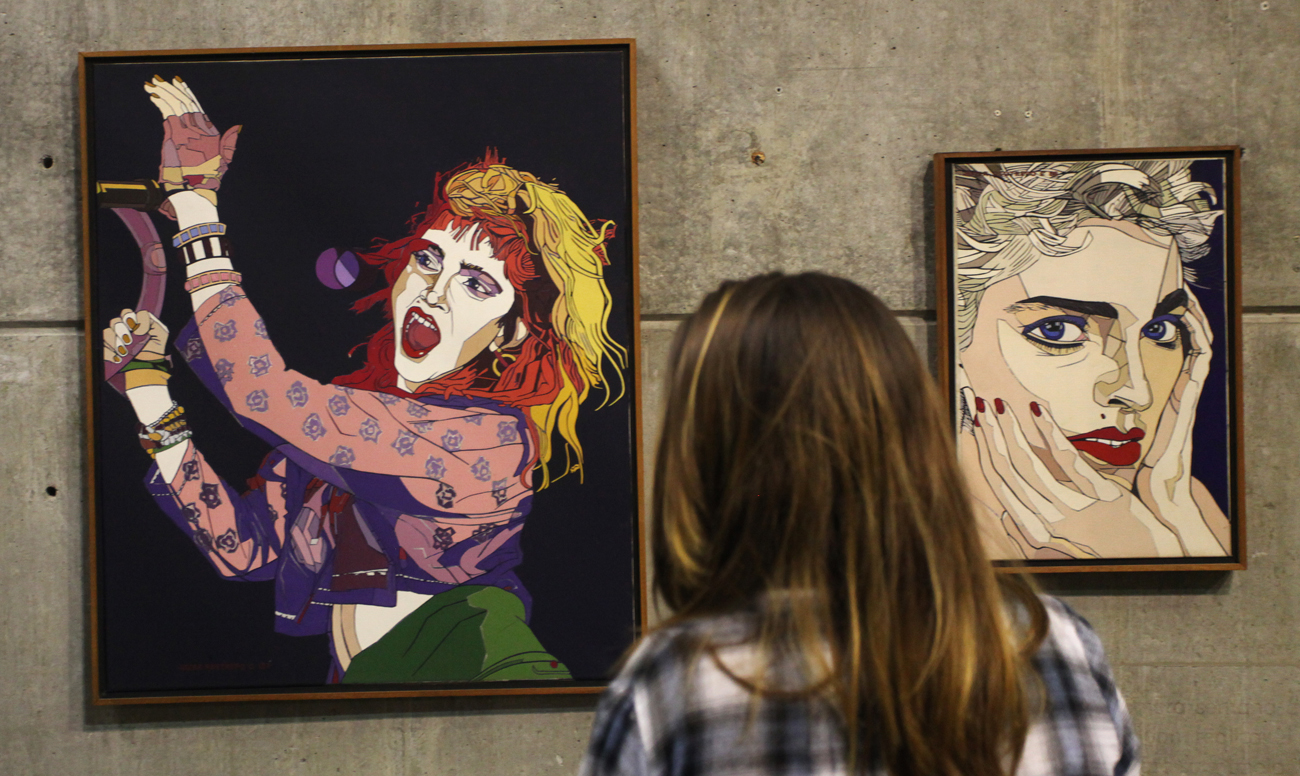
Madonna has been depicted in various domains, including arts.

Madonna and her likeness have been depicted in various domains; in Madonna as Postmodern Myth (2002), Guilbert explored and referred to "several domains", including museums depictions. In 2011, The Guardian's Peter Robinson felt and stated there is a "little bit of her in the DNA" in several "modern pop thing[s]".

=== Science and cultural tributes ===
Madonna appeared in official stamps in Grenada (1989), in St. Vincent (1991), and was considered to be featured in early 1990s in the stamps by the United States Postal Service. In 2001, a commemorative tartan, called "Romantic Scotland (Madonna)" was dedicated to her by the Scottish Register of Tartans. A segment was dedicated to her during the L'International des Feux Loto-Québec of 2015. On science references, Echiniscus madonnae is a water bear specie named after Madonna in 2006. The zoologists commented: "We take great pleasure in dedicating this species to one of the most significant artists of our times". Quadricona madonnae is a fossil Bradoriid from the Cambrian of South Australia named after her; in reference to the nodes on each valve resembling her conical bustiers.

=== Cultural critics' lists, reference works and polls ===
Madonna made appearance in lists and references dedicated to significant personalities from the 20th century. She was included on TV Guide's 101 People Who Made the 20th Century, season one, which was a "look" of influential people who made "dramatic impacts" during that century. She was also included in the Ultimate Biography: Inside the Lives of the World's 250 Most Influential People (2002), which is based on the longest-running, single-topic documentary series Biography by A&E. She was also the highest ranking female musical artist, in any genre in the Who's Bigger?: Where Historical Figures Really Rank (2013), a rank of "1,000 people in history".

Madonna on genderless cultural critics' lists and polls (all-time/century) (Note: Limited to genderless cultural lists. For all-time/century appearances in reference works and critics' lists, among females (see Feminism of Madonna), entertainers/pop culture (see List of Madonna records and achievements), gay icons (see Madonna as a gay icon), sex symbols (see Madonna and sexuality) or fashion icons (see Fashion of Madonna))
Year	Publication or institution	List or Work	Ref.
1998	Carol Publishing Group	The Italian 100 (A Ranking of the Most Influential Cultural, Scientific, and Political Figures, Past and Present)	
2002	Life	50 Most Influential Boomers	
2005	Discovery Channel	100 Greatest Americans	
2008	Encyclopædia Britannica	100 Most Influential Americans	
2008	National Geographic Society	1001 People Who Made America	
2013	Steven Skiena	Who's Bigger?: Where Historical Figures Really Rank (1,000 people in history)	
2014	Smithsonian Institution	100 Most Significant Americans of All Time	
2026	Forbes	250 America's Greatest Innovators	

=== Superlatives in popular press ===
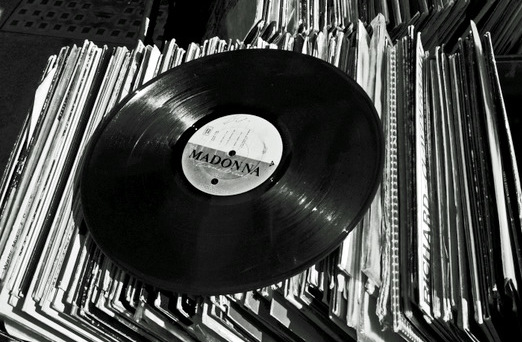
Up to early 2020s, Madonna remains as the best-selling musical female artist.

Some have noted how she has been given and earned superlatives, including The A.V. Club's editors in 2019 and American journalist Meredith Vieira in 2006.

Across her multi-decades career, Madonna has been celebrated as one of the greatest and influential female artists of all-time; journalist Norman Mailer considered her "our greatest living female artist". Madonna was further considered to be "the most influential female" in contemporary music. This was noted by announcer Juanma Ortega in 2020, while American journalist Michael Musto claimed in 2015, that she emerged as "the most influential" for decades. Specific examples include pieces from media outlets around the world, including Stephanie Busari from CNN in 2008, Radio Free Europe/Radio Liberty (2008) and Vogue Mexico (2020). Other references include in "pop history", or from American music history according to MTV or BET. In 2018, Ben Kelly from The Independent argued that she "ensured her legacy as the greatest female artist of all time". VH1 placed her twice as the Greatest Woman in Music, in 2002 as a result of a poll, and in 2012.

=== Sobriquetes on popular culture ===
According to Australian magazine The Music in 2019, Madonna has been called "many things" both negative and positive. In Celebrity Colonialism (2009), University of Tasmania's professor Robert Clarke also noted the "range of nicknames" in media reports referring to her "big business pop career". On the point, Chilean magazine Qué Pasa commented in 1996, that to "Madonna can be attributed many titles and never be exaggerated", further calling her the "undisputed Queen of Pop". Other examples include "Queen of Rock" during the 20th century, and "Queen of Music" industry over the years.

Madonna began to be referred to as "Madge" in mid-80s by British music magazines like Sounds, with their editor John Harris calling her in 1991, "Our Madge". Turning the late 1990s, authors like Christopher Zara noted how the generalized British press, especially tabloids, began to call her "Madge", connoting along with other meanings, a local shorthand for "Your Madgesty". Press overseas later adopted both references, with Alex Hopper from American Songwriter saying "she was given that title because of her Queenliness in the music industry".

== Music industry ==
The history of pop music can essentially be divided into two eras: pre-Madonna and post-Madonna

— Billboard staffers (2018).

Madonna has been attributed to impact the industry, in terms of "sound, image, performance, sex, fandom and reinvention", said Greek author Constantine Chatzipapatheodoridis.

=== Markets, genres and popularizing of things ===
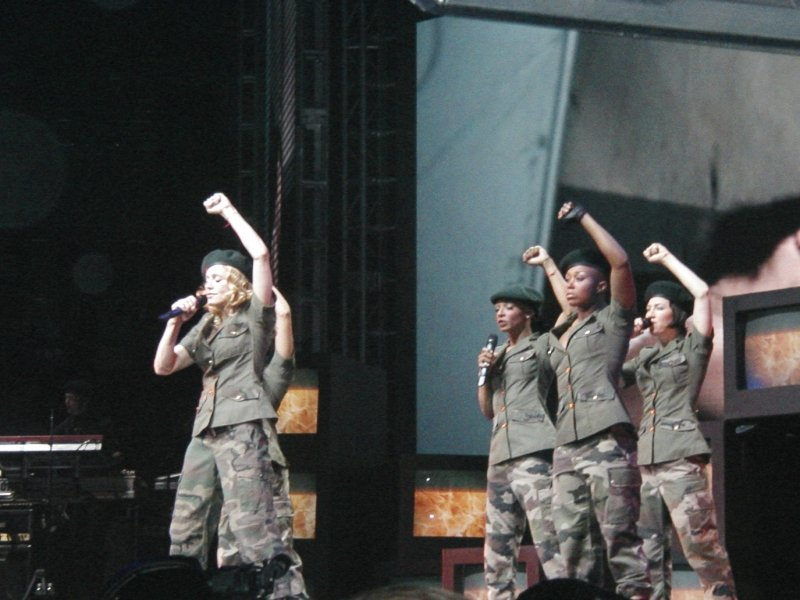
Madonna performing "American Life" (2003) in the Re-Invention World Tour (2004). It is the first or second song to have ever debuted with Internet sales alone on the Billboard Hot 100.

In 2014, Xavi Sancho from El País considered that during the height of her career, her releases were not only mere musical and commercial events, but rather, they marked a way forward. Author Marshawn Evans commented she helped revolutionize in her generation how music was performed, delivered to the public, purchased, packaged and downloaded. A 1984 article inside Billboard, echoed that the simultaneous releases of LP, cassette and CD were pioneered by Madonna within WEA-Warner branches. Madonna would later have the biggest first-week album shipments in the history of Warner Music and one of the largest overall, with Ray of Light (1998) and Music (2000). Furthermore, Madonna popularized the usage of the Korg M1, as The Vinyl Factory reports, while The Immaculate Collection was the first album to implement the QSound effect. Madonna would also affect music video industry, called as her "main contribution" to the industry by some insiders ahead of her induction into the Rock and Roll Hall of Fame in 2008. For instance, she released the first video single in the U.S. "Justify My Love", which remains the best-selling video single. Madonna also influenced mainstream pop stage shows, particularly with her Blond Ambition World Tour, according to The New York Times, while her performance shows inspired others over decades, according to author of The Twisted Tale of Glam Rock (2010).

Madonna's chief impact in music was in the pop music realm. She was a pioneer to popularize dance-pop according to Arie Kaplan. According to music critic Stephen Thomas Erlewine, Madonna also had a "huge role" in popularizing dance music with her debut album, marked by a lack of credibility for disco music at that time. At the end of the decade, an article published by The Spokesman-Review also detailed her significant impact in the dance musical scene. Bob Tannenbaum from The New York Times credits her for help to the evolution of remixing from underground to a standard practice. Other critics and scholars credited Madonna for help to introduce electronic music into the stage of popular music to the masses, or at least within mainstream American pop culture, according to British scholar David Gauntlett, as the genre was most popular outside of America. In 2019, MTV's Erica Russell stated she "reignite interest" in the concept album within mainstream pop after the decline of the rock-oriented concept album in the 1980s.

=== Female figure and paradigm shifts ===
More than any other artist, Madonna deconstructed the roles that women play, not only in music but in all of popular culture [...] for the first time placed female voices at the center of pop discourse, as actors rather than spectators.

— Music critic Dave Marsh, New Book of Rock Lists (1994)

According to the Rock and Roll Hall of Fame, she helped dissolve gender boundaries. Tony Sclafani from MSNBC said the word "female" is significant in her assessment, and English music journalist Dylan Jones referred she was "genuinely influential". In Music in American Life: A-C (2013), scholar Jacqueline Edmondson studied different female artists and said about Madonna that she "deserves special attention", labeling her "legacy" as "important to understanding issues surrounding gender and the music industry in the twenty-first century".

A number of international music critics, authors, and publications, addressed how Madonna played a major role in establishing the contemporary global pop music stage. Deborah Wilker, pop music writer for Sun Sentinel commented in 1996, that Madonna expanded the role of woman in pop further that others. In 2017, British music journalist David Hepworth said that "most of biggest of pop music" are woman and Madonna "is the person who proved that this was possible, who opened up a new world for them to grow into". In 2014, Spaniard music journalist Diego A. Manrique described the dominance of female singers on record charts as the "Madonna era". Gillian Branstetter from The Daily Dot, who also dedicated a lengthy article to her influence, said: "The vast majority of the top artists in the world were men" when Madonna debuted. In Popular Texts in English (2001), authors referred to her as an "atypical female phenomenon in the world of pop", while German media Deutsche Welle would later call her as "the first woman to dominate the male world of pop". Washington Post's Richard Harrington said in 1990, that Madonna heralded "the arrival of female mega-stars".

Her impact was further attested in the way future generations of female popular singers were subsequently scrutinized. On this, a Vice contributor said that "reviews of her work have served as a roadmap for scrutinizing women at each stage in their music career". Similarly, scholars in Ageing, Popular Culture and Contemporary Feminism (2014) agreed that her figure is "widely considered to have defined the discursive space for examining female popular music". Eric Thompson from City Pages also commented in 2011, that her influence is "felt in the way modern female musicians are viewed, regarded and accepted". In 2013, Dutch scholars in Celebrity Studies noted how female artists were "very often measured against the yardstick that Madonna has become". Linda Lister classifies three categories of "deification of modern female pop stars" in 2001, including prima donnas known for their vocal abilities, and Madonnas, for their innovation.

However, Madonna attained significant criticisms amid the rock scene in the 1980s, remarked by authors such as Jennifer Egan whom she retrospectively included herself in 2002 among that perception. Noting also the criticism, Paglia said "our minds were formed by rock music". As early as 1985, The Canberra Times would referred her impact saying she "nearly reversed the typical pattern of rock idol analysis", while the Encyclopedia of American Social History (1993) describes her as "the antithesis of the women found in early rock and roll". According to the Rock and Roll Hall of Fame in 2008, she became an emblem of women in rock; scholar Landon Palmer, recalls that she was frequently described as a "rock star" by media and official institutions, saying that Madonna served as an example of how the label exceeded the distinctions of genre.

== Musicability ==
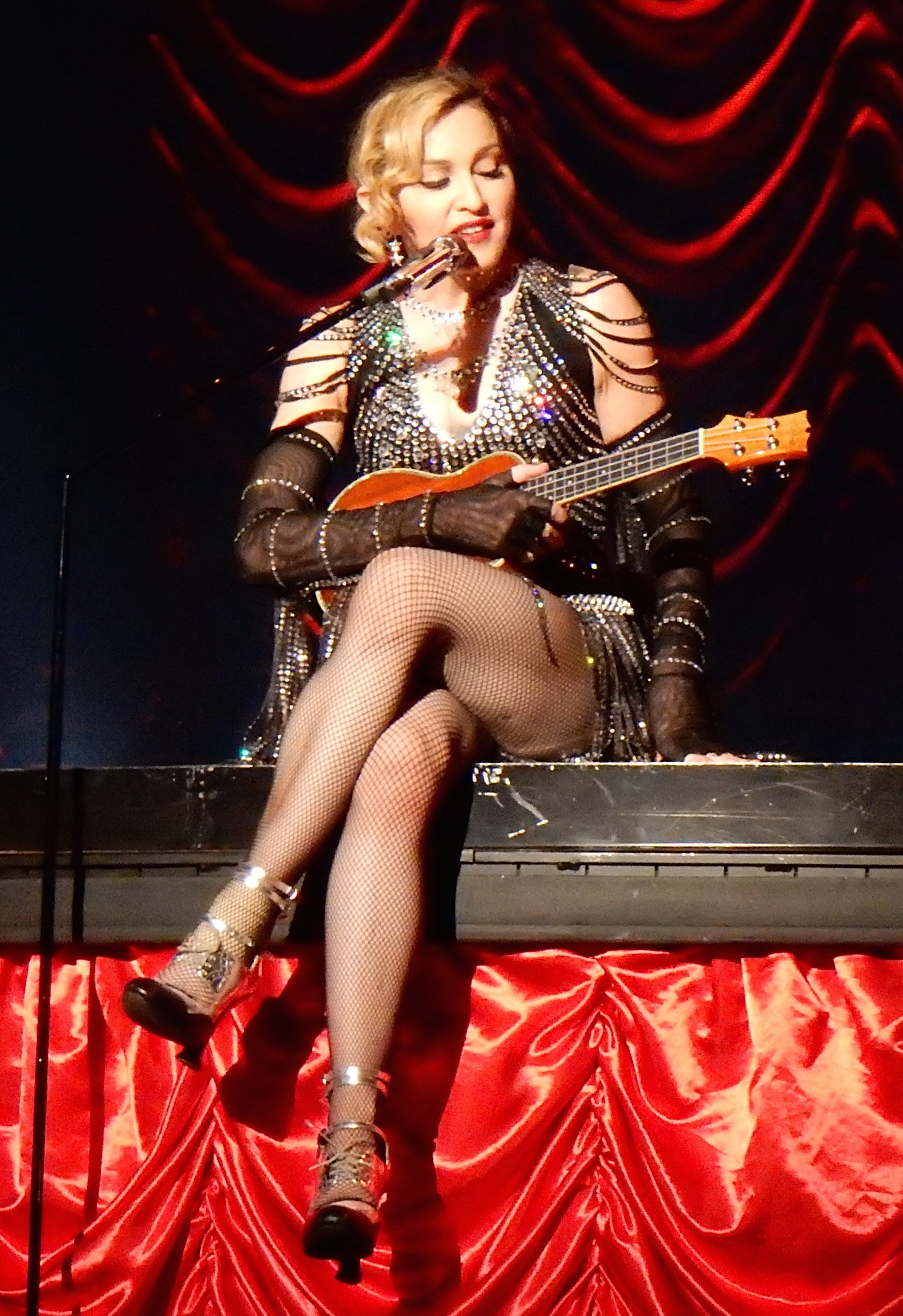
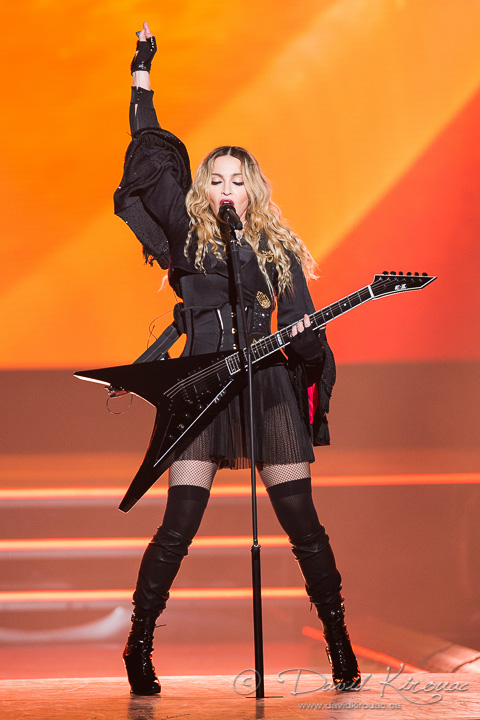
While no virtuous, Madonna has ventured to play some instruments, including Ukulele in the Rebel Heart Tour and plays regularly the Guitar.

According to music critic Robert Christgau in Grown Up All Wrong (2000), Madonna was "honored less as an artist than as a cultural force". A scholar also noted how in the "field of musicology, serious discussion of Madonna has been even rarer than in the popular press". Similarly, in Representing Gender in Cultures (2004), authors also explained that she has been "consistently denied a status of a 'real' musician". One of the focal critical views is a general agreement that her own "artistic talents" are considered to be "limited" by critics. Other critics have also complained that the content of her songs are "empty".

To musicologist Ketih E. Clifton at Central Michigan University, Madonna as a composer, arranger and singer, is anything but "one-dimensional" artist. In 1990, critic Stephen Holden commented for The New York Times that her "abilities as a singer and songwriter were developed" after she became famous.

=== Vocals ===
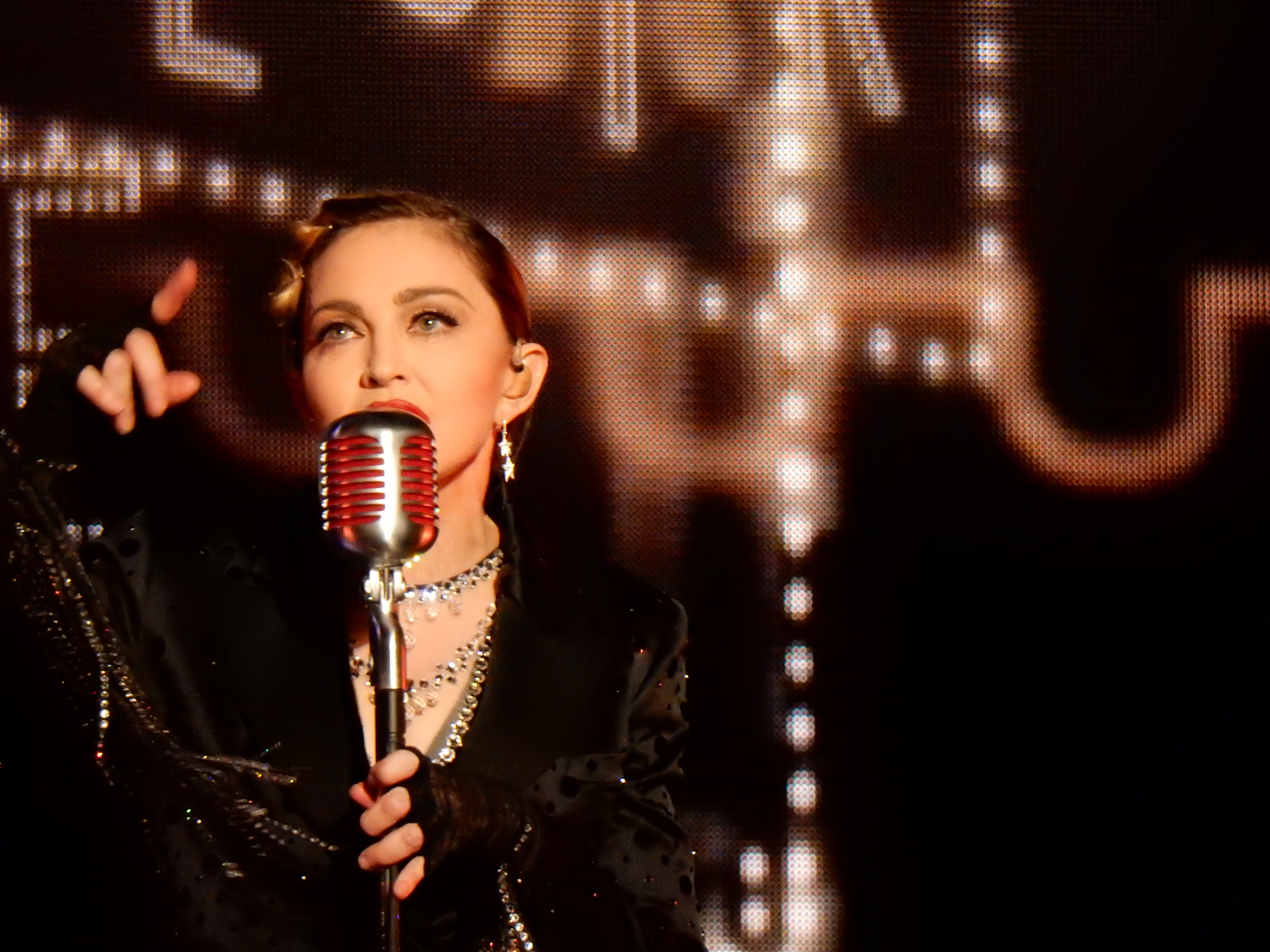
Madonna's vocals would define perceptions of her.

Madonna's vocals would define her career, mostly generally marked by a mixed-to-negative perceptions; as noted author Lucy O'Brien in Madonna: Like an Icon (2007): "Over the years many have criticized Madonna's vocal ability, saying she is a weak singer". In Popular Music and the Politics of Hope (2019), authors similarly stated that "she is routinely dismissed by scholars, critics, and fellow artists alike as someone who 'can't sing'".

Despite criticism, others discussed her evolution. Musicologist Clifton recognizes her vocal "metamorphosis" saying is a "under-theorized aspect of her career". He notes how her voice evolved and shifted, identifying five "vocal styles" or "vocal tropes", but also saying it was "difficult to establish a single prevailing vocal style". Similarly, Dutch linguist Theo van Leeuwen cited her as perhaps "the first singer who used quite different voices for different songs". In Popular Music and the Politics of Hope (2019), authors said that her voice has "certainly changed since the 1980s, showing the signs of age, vocal coaching, and rigorous vocal exercises". O'Brien cited a guitarist as saying that she is an enough "strong interpreted [that] doesn't over-embellish things".

She also received positive reactions, though detailed with various aspects. In 1986, Dr. Karl Podhoretz from University of Dallas called her a "revolutionary voice who has altered the very meaning of sound in our time". In their list of the 100 Best Debut Albums of All Time in 2013, Rolling Stone included Madonna's first album, recognizing her impact and describing her as "the most important female voice in the history of modern music". Other critics and authors favored her voice more for the context of pop music stage. In 2008, Financial Times's art critic Ludovic Hunter-Tilney considered that her critics "do not understand" that pop singers "do not require the vocal technique of Maria Callas". The authors of The SAGE Handbook of Popular Music (2014), similarly commented that for pop singers in the style of Madonna, "brilliant singing ability is not of utmost important" compared to performers of Soul and R&B music, "whose considerable vocal skill" are a crucial aspect in their image. Sociologist Stanley Aronowitz labeled her more a performance artist, saying that she deploys pop music with her singing as a vehicle "for something else going on" and this is a plus or surplus that elicits "the excitement about Madonna".

=== Songwriting ===
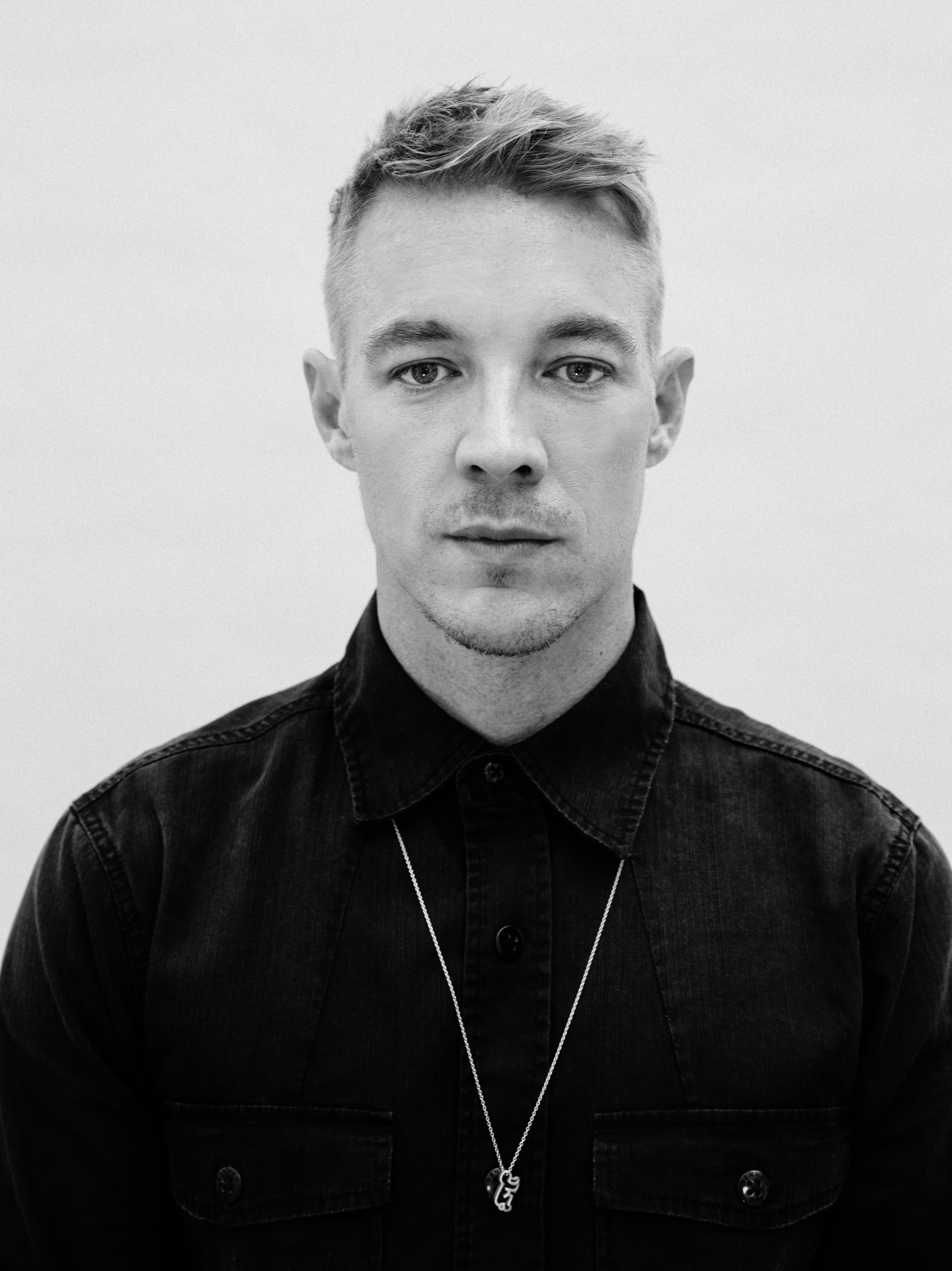
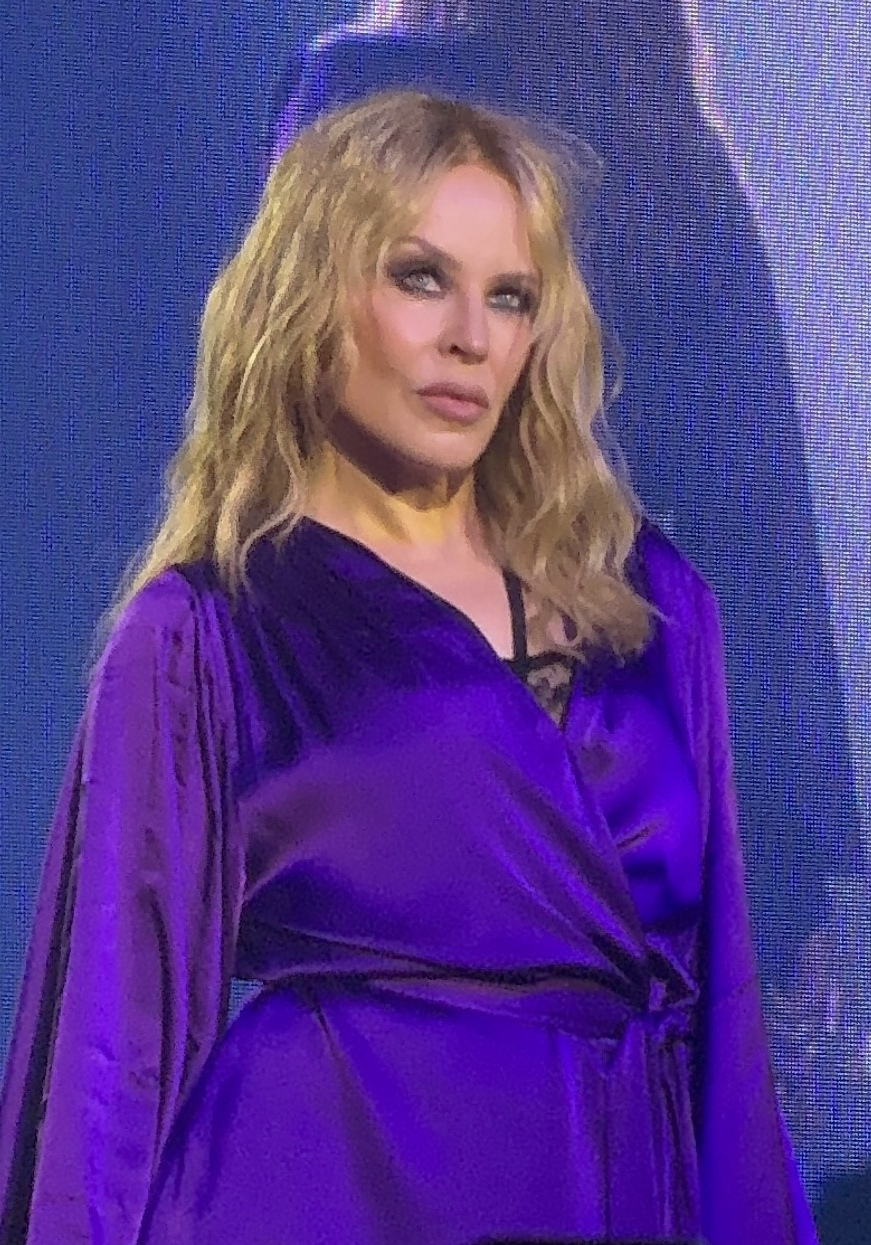
One of Rolling Stone's 100 Greatest Songwriters of All Time, aspects of Madonna's songwriting influenced artists such as Diplo and Kylie Minogue.

Madonna also found success and impact as a songwriter. Named one of the 100 Greatest Songwriters of All Time by Rolling Stone, she once held records such as the songwriter with most number-one songs on the Billboard Hot 100, and was also recognized by the Guinness World Records as the "most successful female songwriter in Britain". Spin's Barry Walters called her a "great songwriter" in 1995. Writer Andrew Morton called her a "musical poet in motion", and biographer Carol Gnojewski a "prolific writer".

Musicologist Susan McClary noted that she writes or co-writes most of her own material. In 1998, The Straits Times called Mariah Carey as "the only singer in the pop diva league besides Madonna who writes and produces her own material". While American Songwriter commented her image as a pop star led some people assume "she didn't write her own songs", Maria Muller from W said that Madonna "normalized the idea that pop stars could and should write their own songs". She was reportedly to influence other singer-songwriters. For instance, Australian music editor Marc Andrews noted how Kylie Minogue was influenced in part by Madonna to start writing her own songs. In 2015, producer Diplo said Madonna "showed me a whole other level of dedication and old school work ethic when it comes to writing".

=== Production and involving process ===
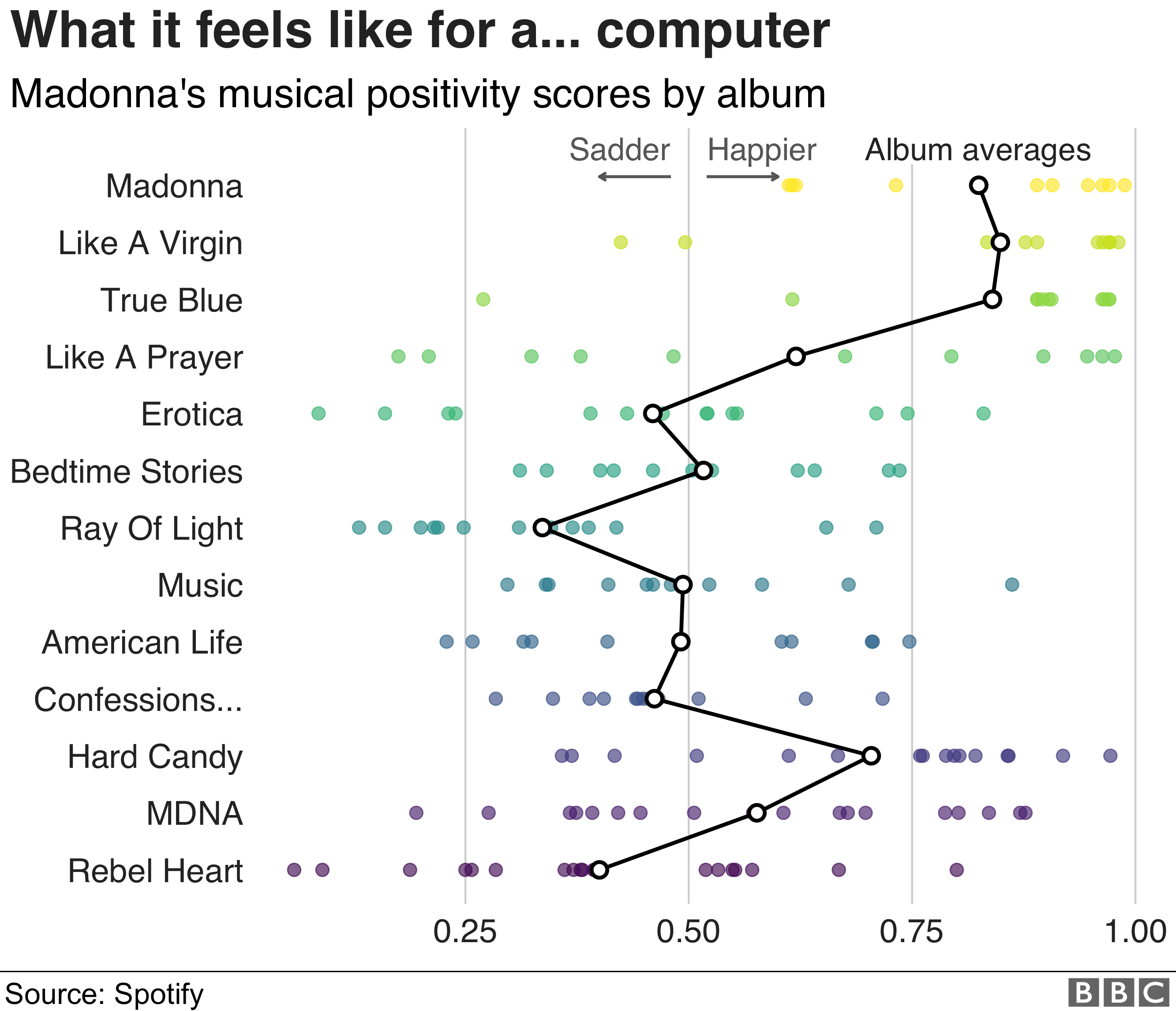
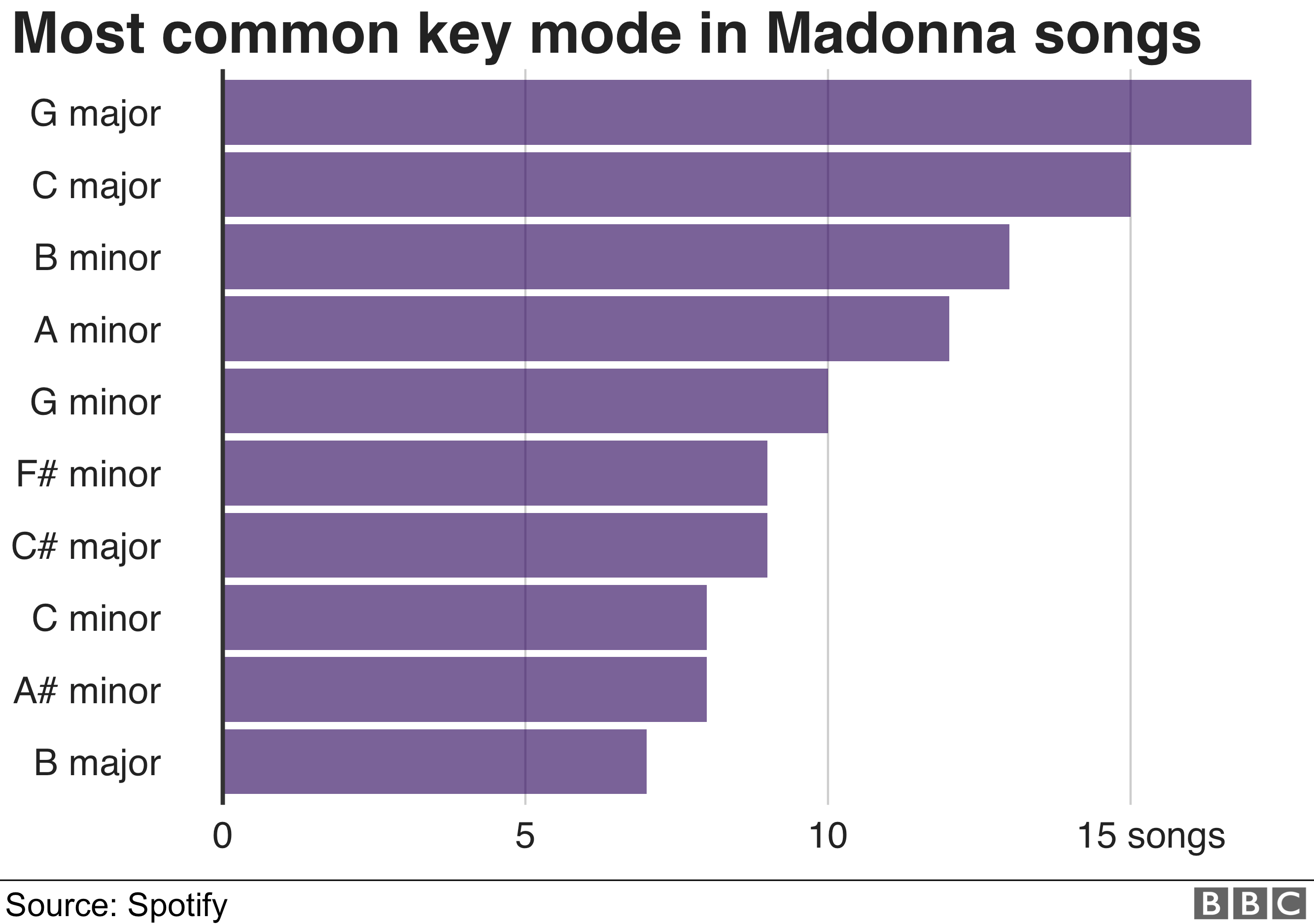
Musical positivity scores by album and most common scales in Madonna's songs according to Spotify (1983—2018)

A number of scholars noted criticisms about how Madonna has worked with various producers—especially men—in her career, assuming they were the solely responsible for her creative output. In 1995, critic Gina Arnold commented for Metro Silicon Valley, that she certainly hires "well-producers" but applauded Madonna's consistency and personal injection, further considering her as the most "consistent than any of other artist of the last decade" with a vision of "incredibly broad".

During an interview with Peter Robinson in 2005, producer Stuart Price told: "You don't produce Madonna, you collaborate with her... She has her vision and knows how to get it". Billboard magazine made similar remarks. Producer Guy Sigsworth similarly states, Madonna is not one of the artists that hire a producer and expect them to do all the work. She instead, is very "intimately involved in the whole creative process as a collaborator and producer" and is a side "ignorated by people so fixated on her image".

Madonna would also impact the career of some producers, mostly from then-underground scene, including William Orbit, Mirwais Ahmadzaï and Price, as Billboard commented she "plucked" them from "electronic music obscurity". According to the Guinness World Records, Madonna is the most remixed act.

== Influence on other entertainers ==
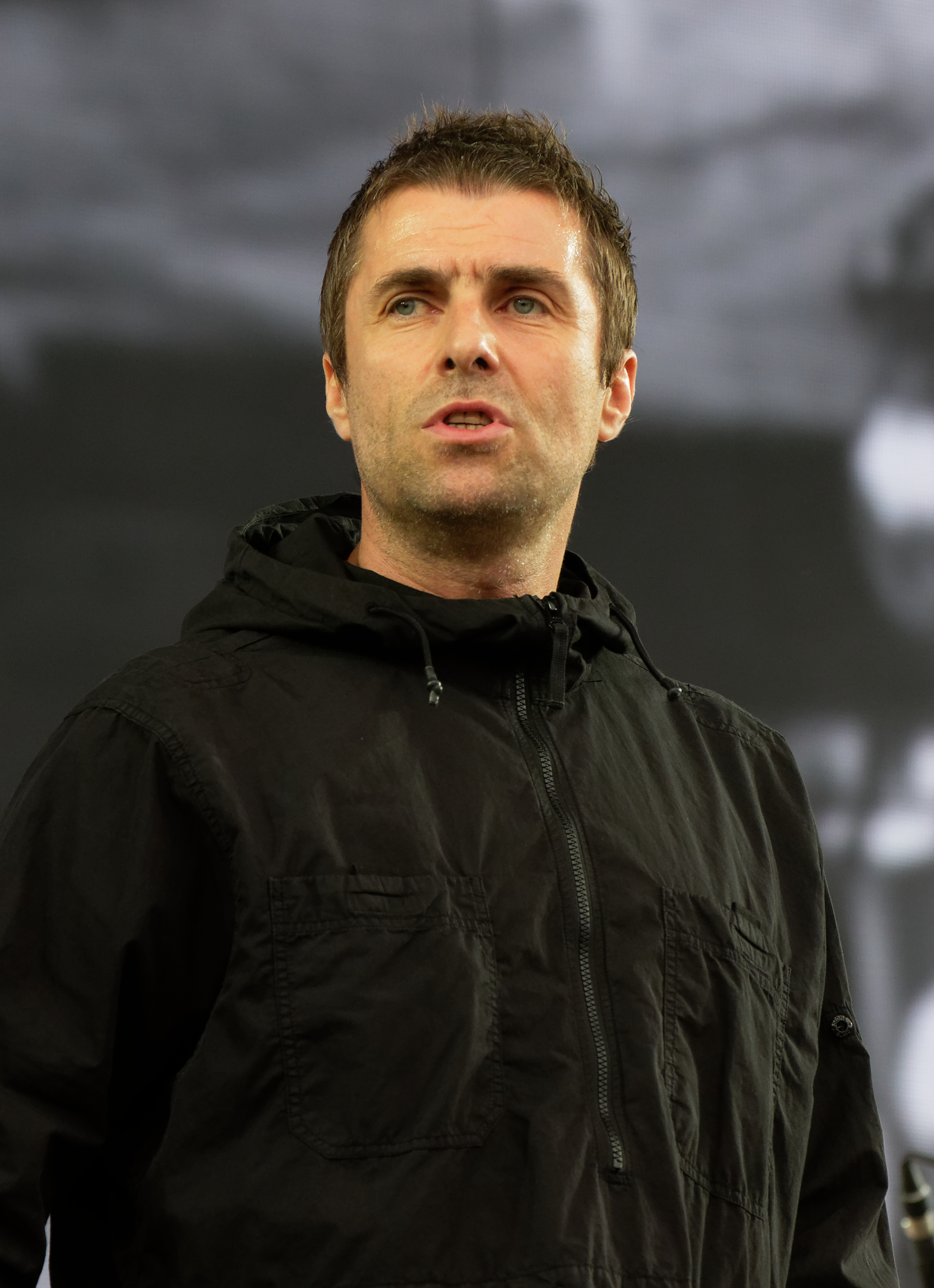
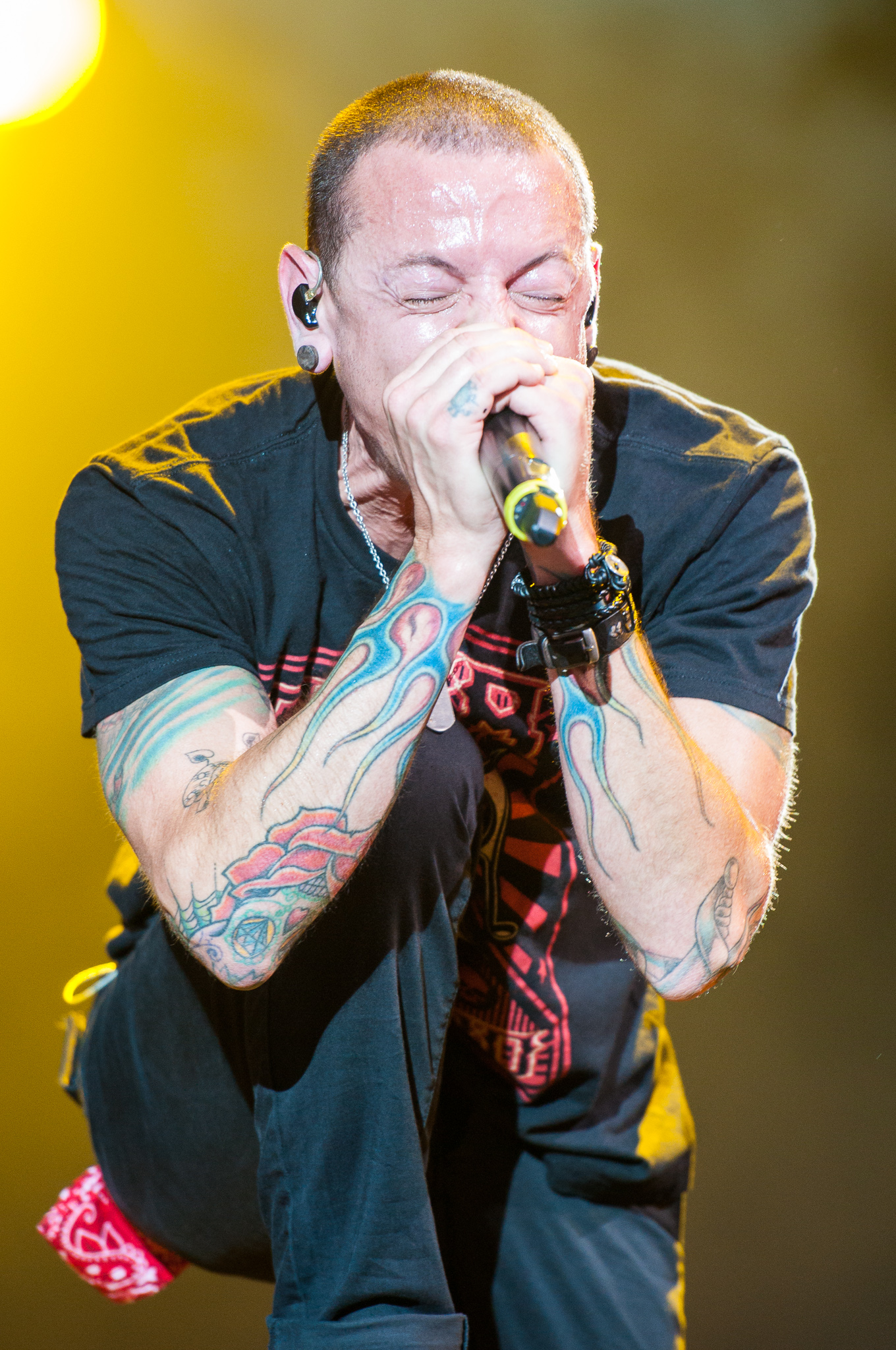
Madonna inspired rock frontmen Liam Gallagher (Oasis) and Chester Bennington (Linkin Park) to become musicians.

Madonna's role as a source of inspiration or influence on other entertainers was also commented. Some devoted articles discuss it, including The Spokesman-Review in 1989 among dance-music performers. In 2018, the Canadian Broadcasting Corporation dedicated a listicle of Canadian artists influenced by Madonna, while in early 2000s, British media scholar David Gauntlett discussed her influence on other female performers denoting "four key" themes, calling many of them as Madonna's "musical daughters" in the "very direct sense" they grew up listening to and admiring her. Spaniard music journalist Diego A. Manrique similarly called various high-profile female artists as her "heirs". Discussing her 20-years plus career, in 2003, BBC's Ian Youngs said "her influence on others has come as much from her image as her music". In addition, he called Madonna the "pop queen mother".

Commentators particularly noted how her career and works influenced generation of female pop stars, including MacLeod who said she influenced "many girls" in popular music. Noting constant citations from diverse artists, scholars in Ageing, Popular Culture and Contemporary Feminism (2014), said that "judging by the citations she receives from almost every female pop star", she remains "the single biggest female influence on the nature and style of pop music over the course of the late twentieth century".

=== Examples ===
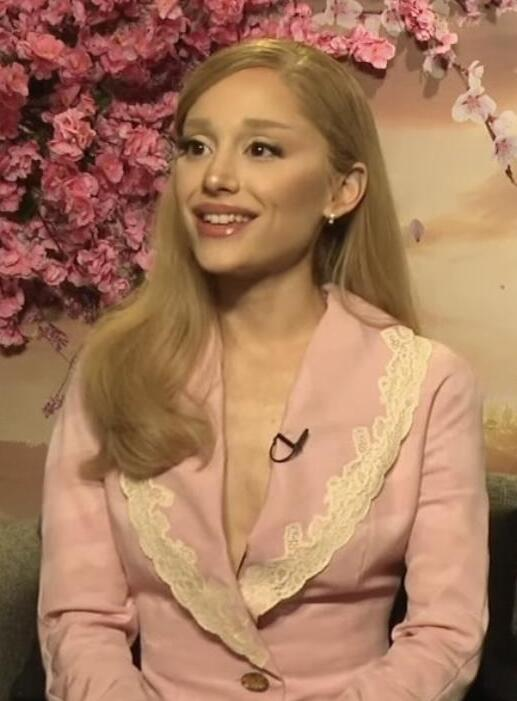
Ariana Grande

Adele

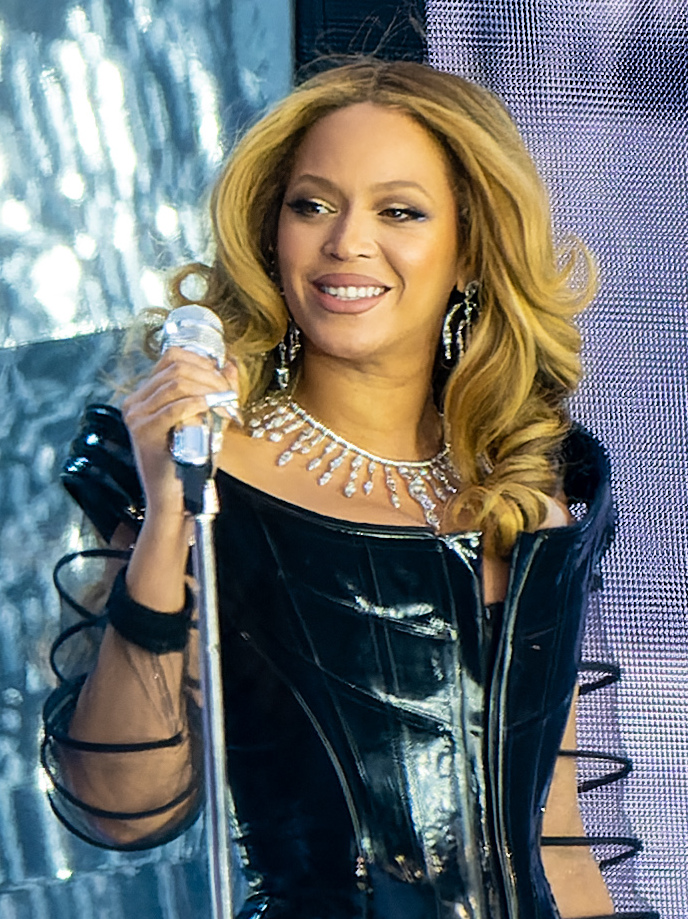
Beyoncé

Tate McRae

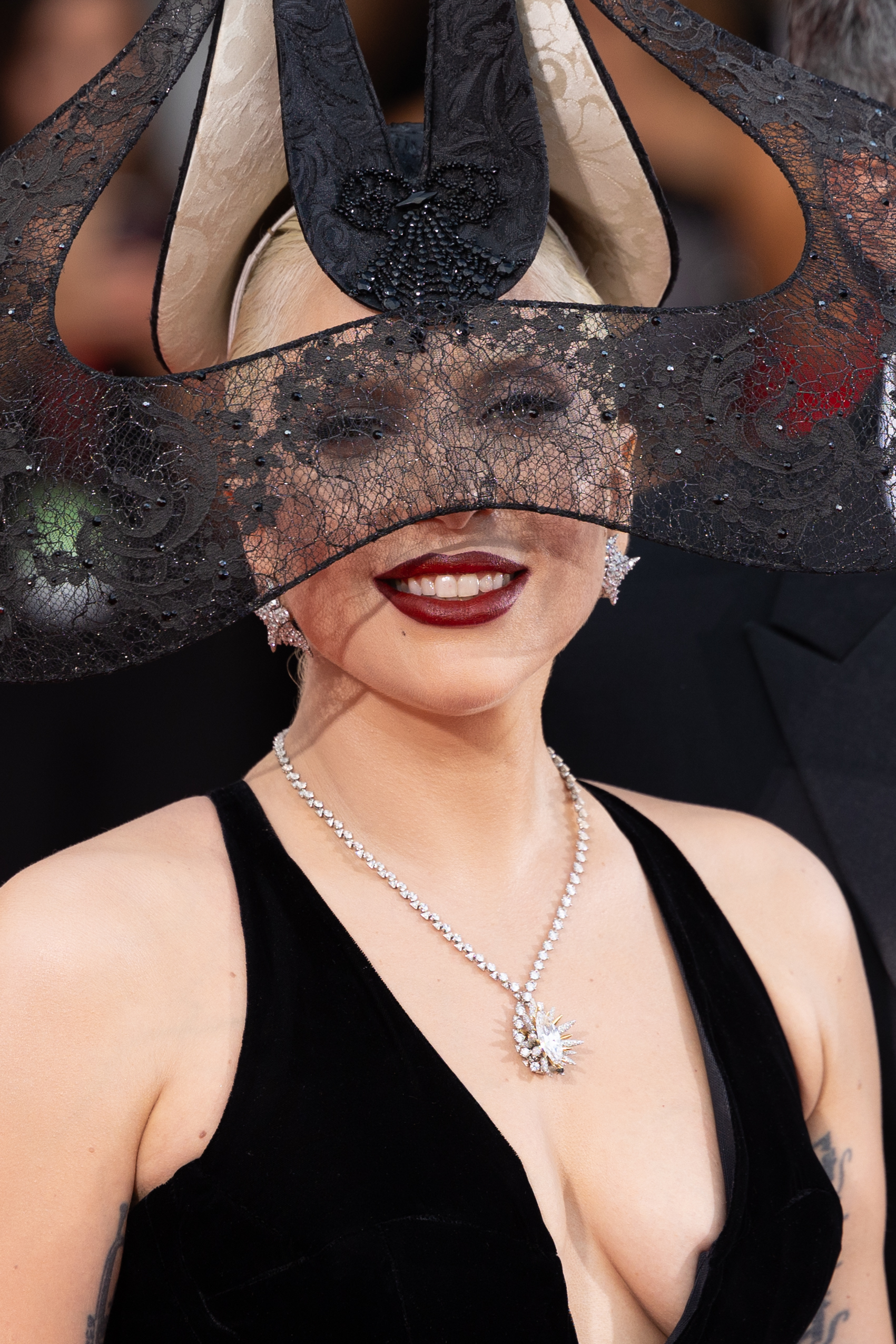
Lady Gaga

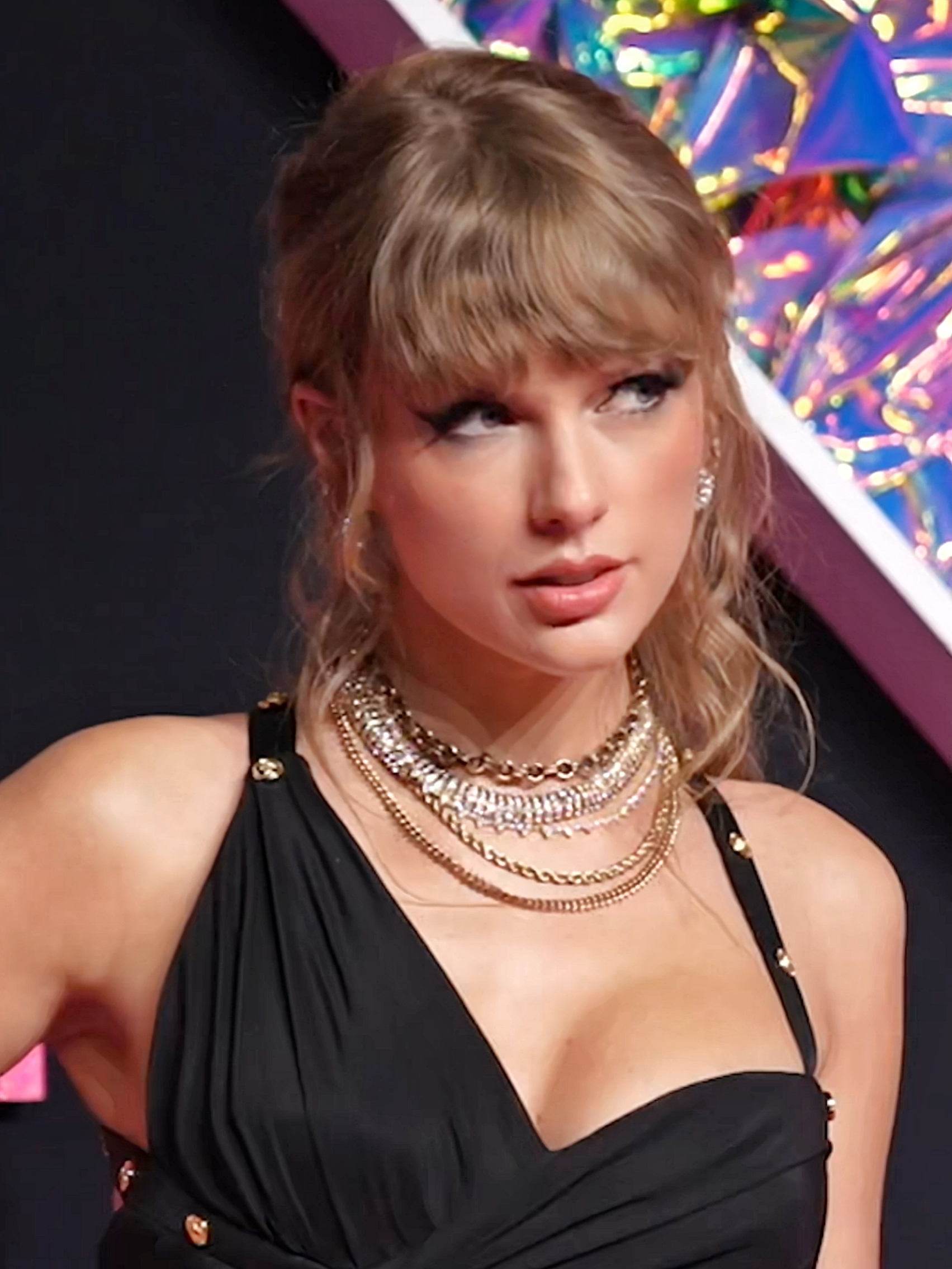
Taylor Swift

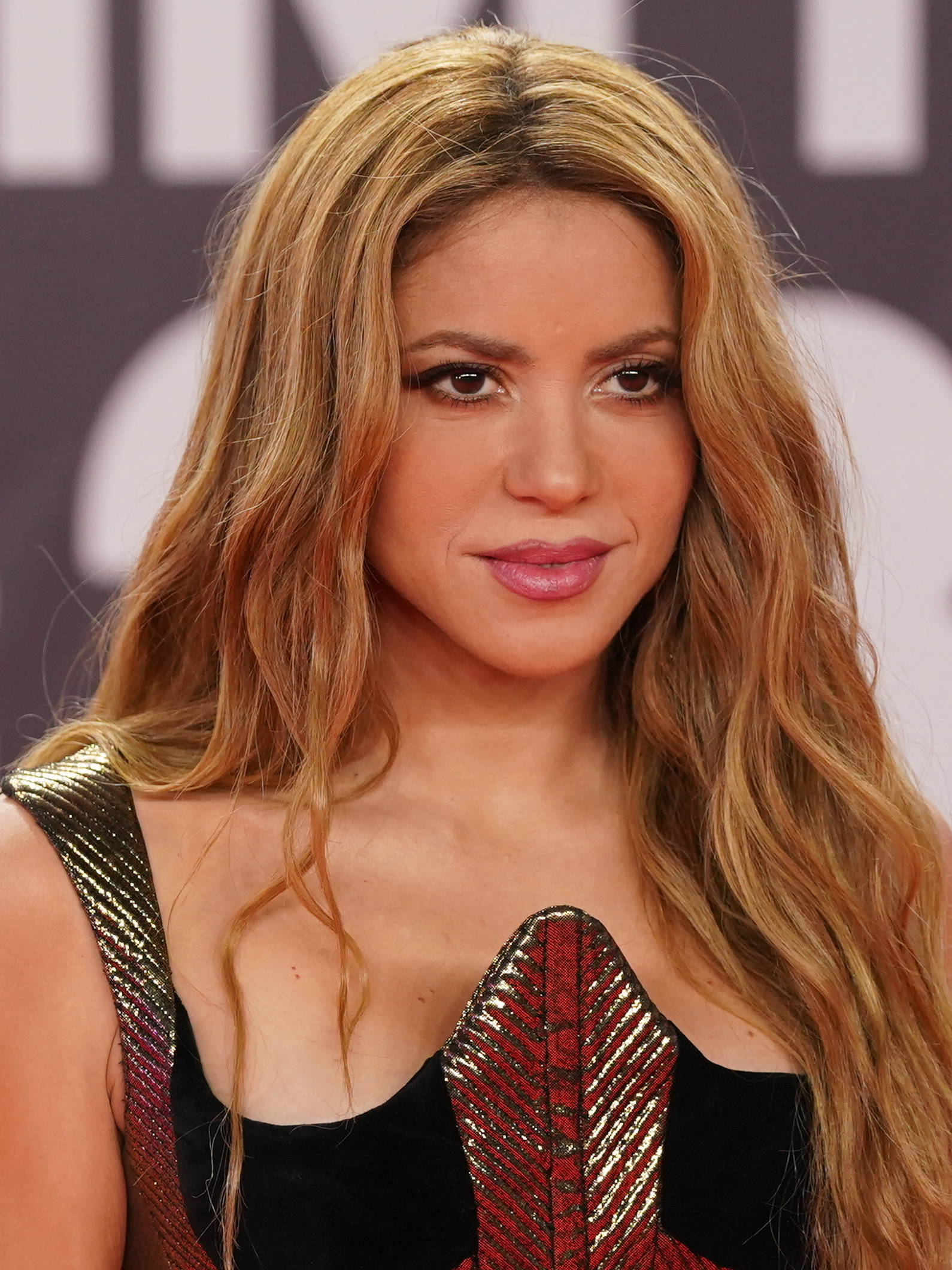
Shakira

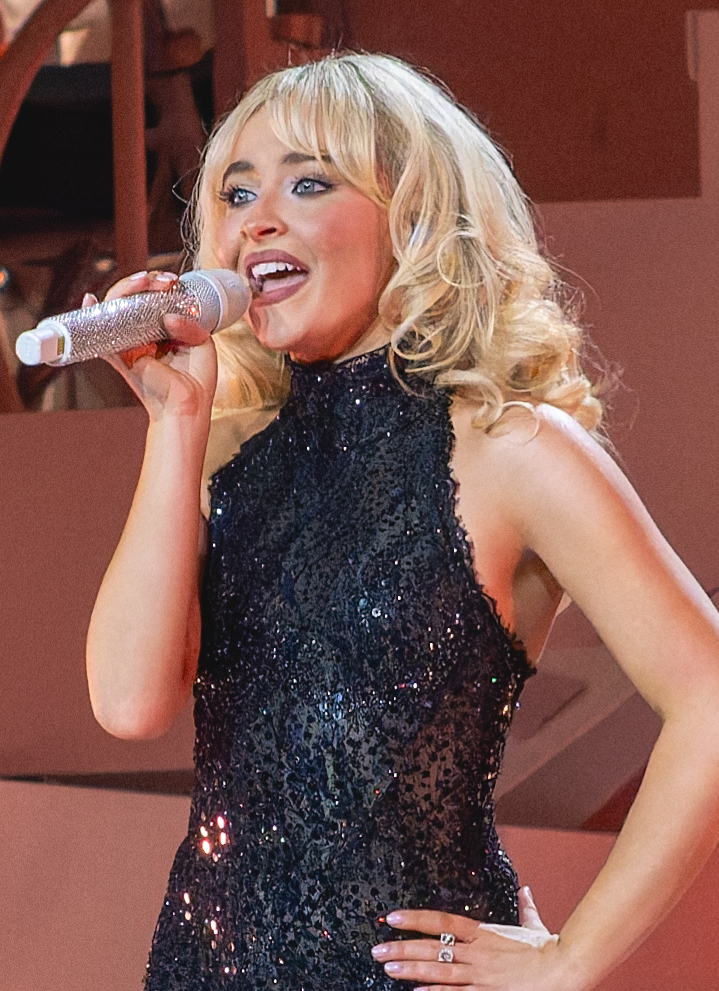
Sabrina Carpenter

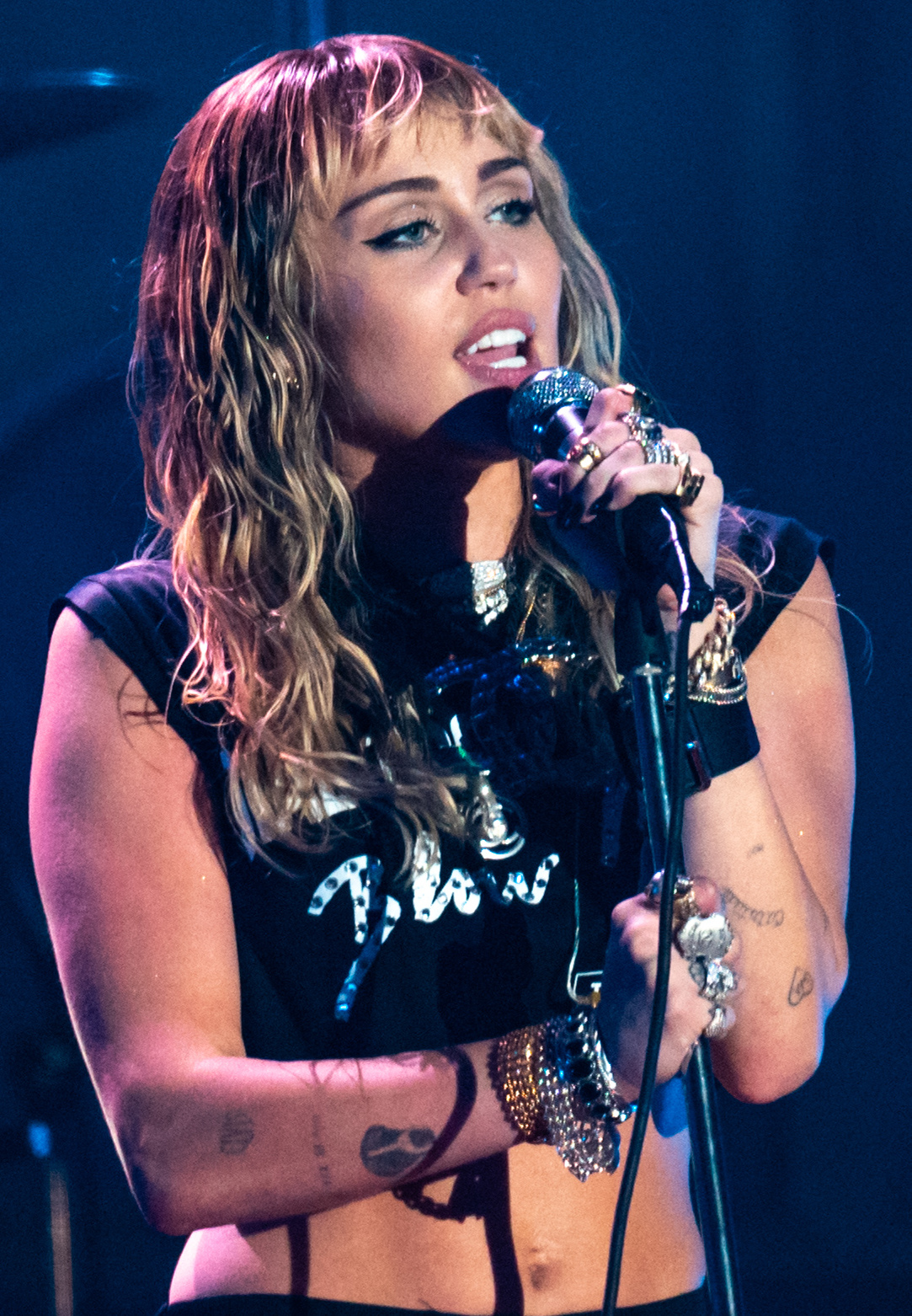
Miley Cyrus

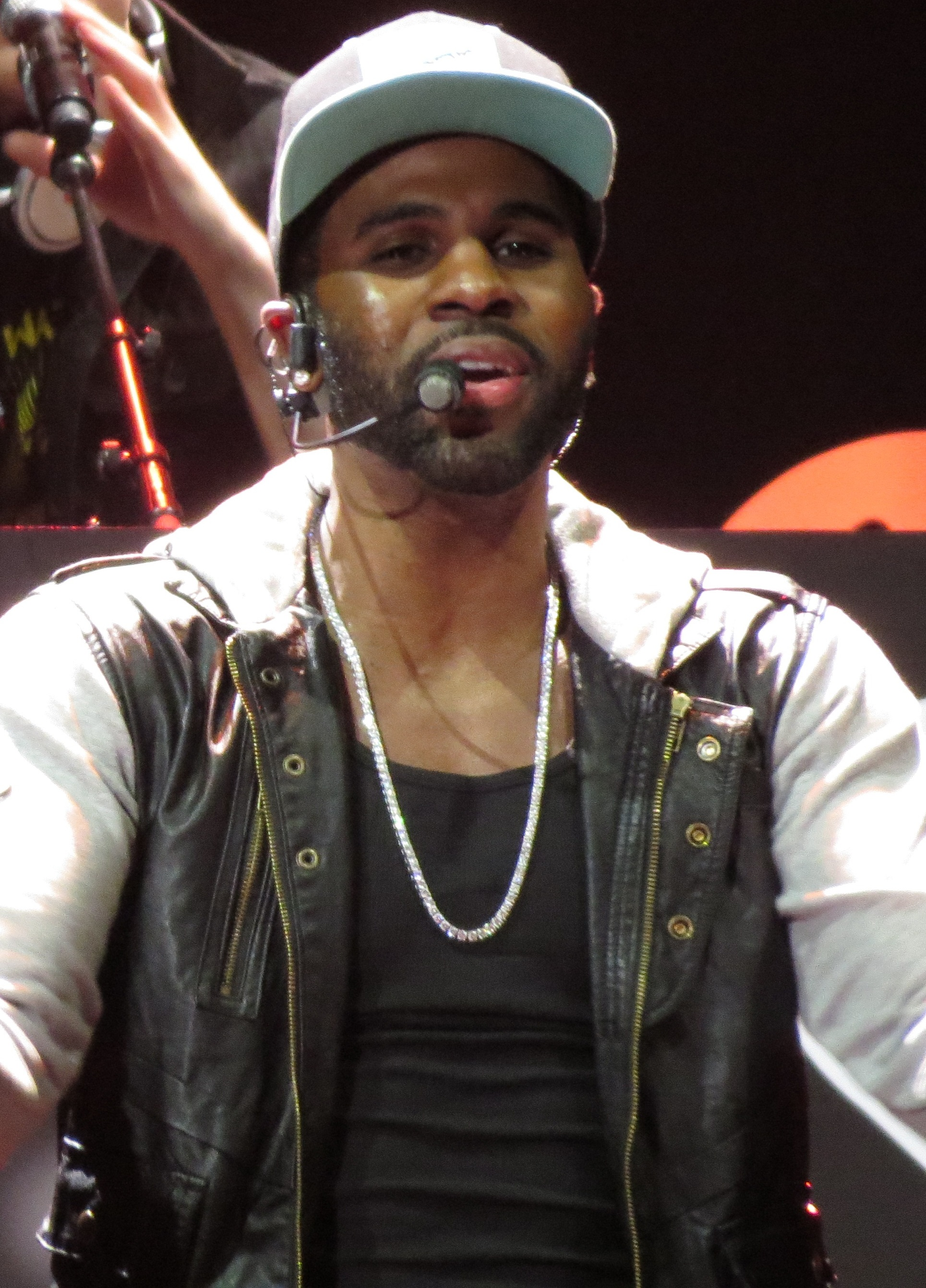
Jason Derulo

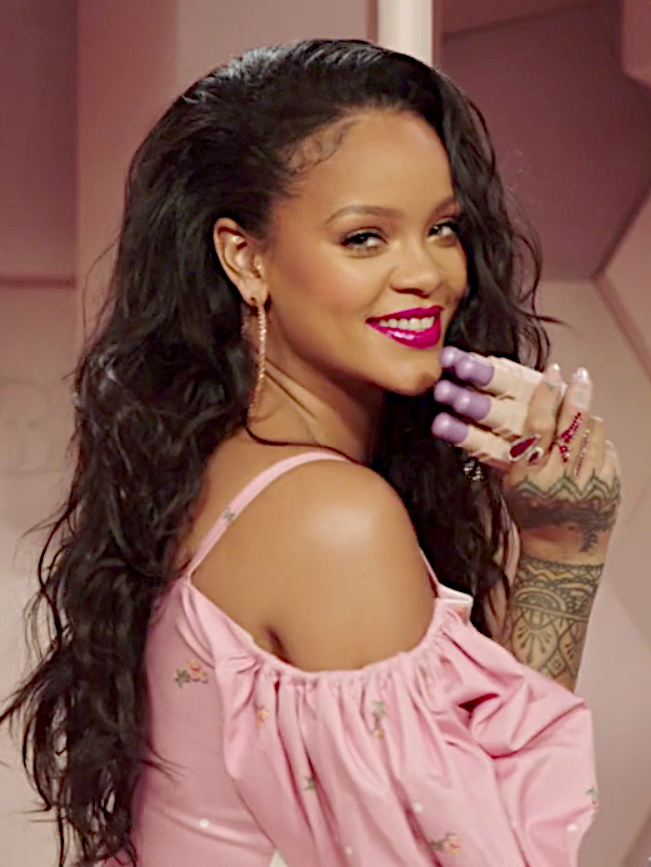
Rihanna

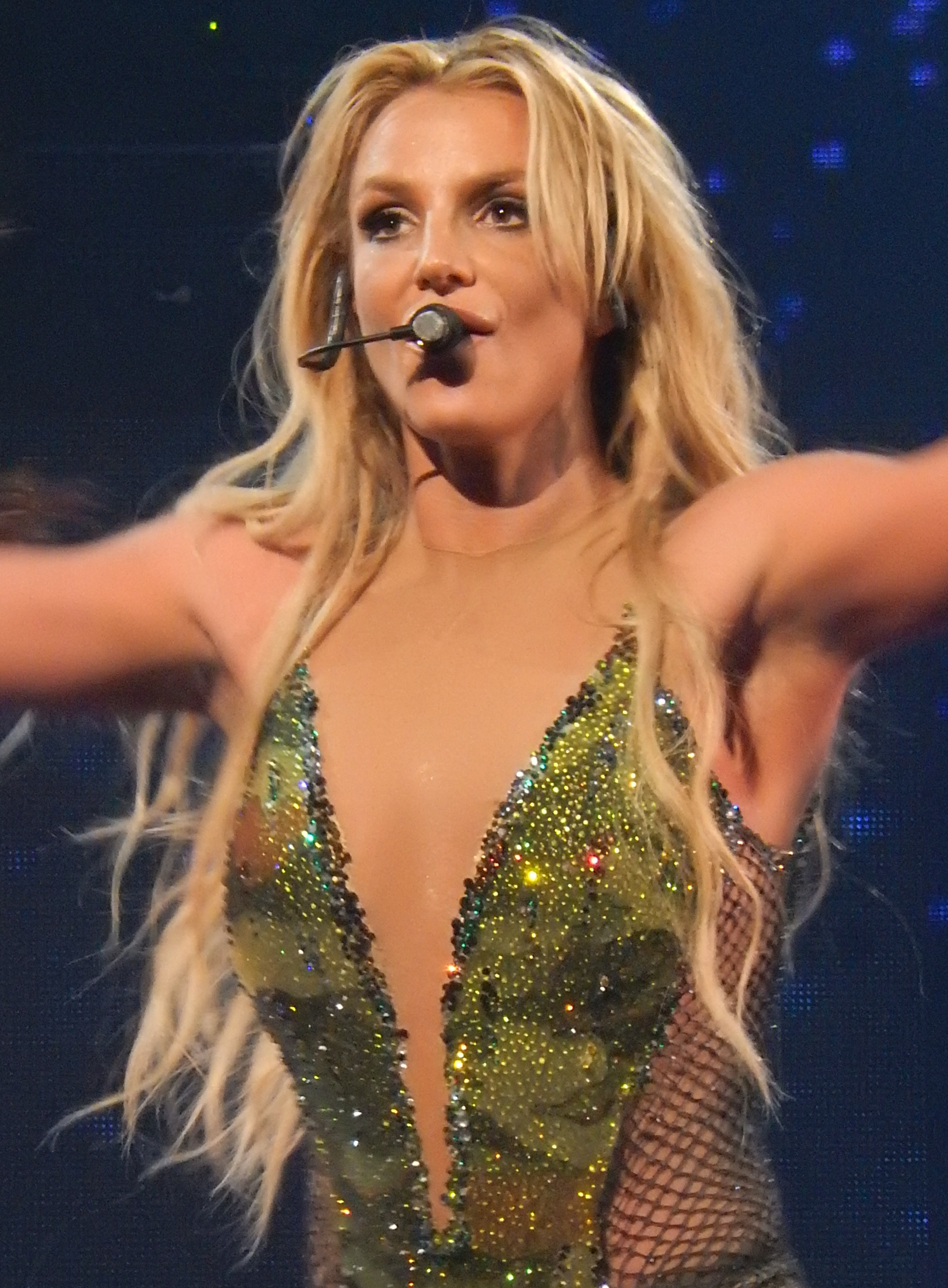
Britney Spears

Aspects of Madonna's career and works have influenced varied of artists of diverse genres and generations, including those pictured above.

Madonna's career and works has inspired numerous international vocalists and popular singers from diverse genres across decades. The following are illustrative examples:

- Aaron Bruno
- Adam Lambert
- Addison Rae
- Adéla
- Adele
- Agnez Mo
- Alesha Dixon
- Alexandra Stan
- Alice Chater
- Amanda Magalhães
- Anitta
- Ariana Grande
- Ayumi Hamasaki
- Ava Max
- Avril Lavigne
- Bebe Rexha
- Beth Ditto
- Beyoncé
- Britney Spears
- Camila Cabello
- Cardi B
- Carly Rae Jepsen
- CL
- Cobra Starship
- Chappell Roan
- Charli XCX
- Christina Aguilera
- Doja Cat
- Dua Lipa
- Esperanza Spalding
- Filippa Giordano
- Gwen Stefani
- Hailee Steinfeld
- Hellawes
- Hot Milk
- Iggy Azalea
- Jason Derulo
- Jennifer Lopez
- Kat Graham
- Katy Perry
- Kesha
- Kim Petras
- Kylie Minogue
- Lady Gaga
- La Roux
- Lauren Jauregui
- Lil' Kim
- Lindsay Lohan
- LMFAO
- Lorde
- Marina And The Diamonds
- Miley Cyrus
- Miranda!
- Mya
- Nelly Furtado
- Nicki Minaj
- Normani
- Paris Hilton
- Paula Abdul
- Paulina Rubio
- Pink
- Poppy
- Rêve
- Rihanna
- Rina Sawayama
- Rita Ora
- Robyn
- Sabrina Carpenter
- Selena
- Selena Gomez
- Shakira
- Shygirl
- Sky Ferreira
- Spice Girls
- Taio Cruz
- Tate McRae
- Taylor Swift
- Tiffany Young
- The Ting Tings
- Victoria Justice
- Victoria Vox
- Wanessa Camargo

=== Depictions and tributes by other musicians ===
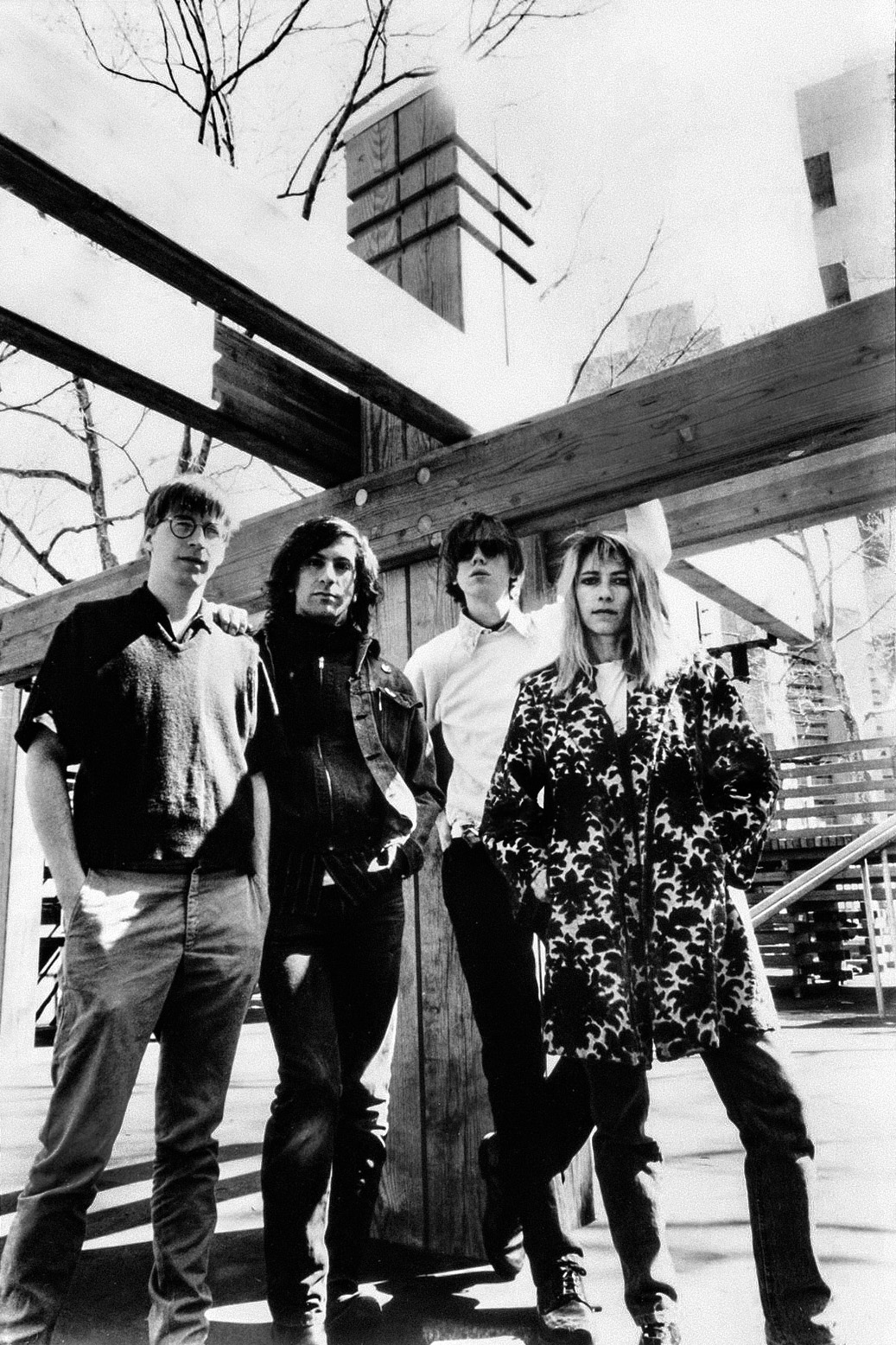
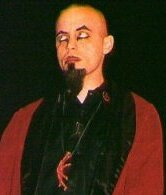
Rock acts Sonic Youth (Ciccone Youth) and Stephen Bair (Madonna Wayne Gacy) adopted Madonna's name into their stage name at some point.

Since the 1980s, Madonna's music has been covered and sampled by multiple artists, including Kelly Clarkson whom made various covers, including during her first-ever American Idol audition in 2002. Beyoncé's sampled Madonna's "Vogue" for the remix of "Break My Soul", which is also a collaborative project among the pair, and where Beyoncé calls her "Queen Mother".

Musicians including Kylie Minogue and the Weeknd once declared to desire work with her, while artists like Tony Bennett have expressed admiration towards Madonna. In a tribute article dedicated to Madonna at The Guardian in 2018, Sophie described "Her work is so vast" that "there's a reference for any situation" and she also considered that Madonna "created the blueprint of modern stars".

Madonna also inspired lyrics to the song "Midlife Crisis" by Faith No More.

=== Other fields ===
Madonna would impact or influence a number of other entertainers and professionals, including painters, designers/videographers, and authors/editors. Writing her first-ever-article—a review of Madonna's Erotica album for the London Evening Standard— Australian Broadcasting Corporation's Anita Barraud said that it helped launch Emma Forrest career. The Herald reporter Lorna Martin achieved the 2001 Scoop of the Year at the Scottish Press Awards, after revealing details of Madonna's wedding with Guy Ritchie, which was labeled to have had a "worldwide impact and significance" that world's press descended upon Dornoch.

Aspects of Madonna's career and works also influenced other entertainment fields, including videogames and movies. She influenced photorealism for Avatar (2009), which lead CinemaBlend to conclude her influence "know no bounds" as she affected virtually, every inch of pop culture. She also influenced the haunting atmosphere of Silent Hill 2.

== See also ==
Madonna's impact and criticisms on Madonna through other areas:

Culture aspects

- Fashion of Madonna
- Feminism of Madonna
- Madonna and contemporary arts
- Business of Madonna
- Madonna and religion
- Madonna and sexuality
- Philanthropy and activism of Madonna

Groupings and subcultures

- Madonna as a gay icon
- Madonna fandom
- Madonna impersonator
- Madonna wannabe
- Madonna (nickname)

Academia and media

- Bibliography of works on Madonna
- List of academic publishing works on Madonna
- Madonna in media
- Madonna studies

Statistics and achievements

- List of Madonna records and achievements
- List of awards and nominations received by Madonna

== Book sources ==
- Arts and Entertainment Network (2002). Ultimate Biography: Inside the Lives of the World's 250 Most Influential People. DK. ISBN 0789484269.
- Aronowitz, Stanley (2013). Dead Artists, Live Theories, and Other Cultural Problems. Routledge. ISBN 978-1136040702.
- Ballesteros González, Antonio (2001). Mora González, Lucía (ed.). Popular Texts in English: New Perspectives. University of Castilla–La Mancha. ISBN 8484271269.
- Bartels, Anke; Wiemann, Dirk (2007). Global Fragments: (dis)orientation in the New World Order. Rodopi. ISBN 978-9042021822.
- Benson, Carol; Metz, Allen (1999). The Madonna Companion: Two Decades of Commentary. Music Sales Group. ISBN 0-02-864972-9.
- Bennett, Andy; Waksman, Steve (2014). The SAGE Handbook of Popular Music. SAGE Publishing. ISBN 978-1473910997.
- Berleur, J.; Beardon, Colin; Laufer, Romain (1993). Facing the Challenge of Risk and Vulnerablity in an Information Society. Vol. 33. North-Holland. ISBN 0-444-89878-6.
- Berger, Arthur Asa (2002). The Art of the Seductress. iUniverse. ISBN 0-595-23077-6.
- Bernhard, Sandra (1989). Confessions of a Pretty Lady. Harper & Row. ISBN 0060916206.
- Birnbaum, Pierre (2008). Geography of Hope: Exile, the Enlightenment, Disassimilation. Stanford University Press. ISBN 978-0804752930.
- Bosch, Lindsay J.; Mancoff, Debra N (2009). Icons of Beauty: Art, Culture, and the Image of Women. Greenwood Press.
- Buikema, Rosemarie; Liedeke, Plate; van der Tuin, Iris; Thiele, Kathrin (2009). Doing Gender in Media, Art and Culture. Taylor & Francis. ISBN 978-1-134-00641-0.
- Blackwell, Roger; Stephan, Tina (2004). Brands That Rock. Wiley. ISBN 978-0-471-48344-1.
- Brunner, Diane DuBose (1998). Between the Masks: Resisting the Politics of Essentialism. Rowman & Littlefield. ISBN 084768895X.
- Brunsdon, Charlotte; Spigel, Lynn (2007). Feminist Television Criticism: A Reader. McGraw Hill Education. ISBN 978-0335225453.
- Campbell, Michael (2012). Popular Music in America:The Beat Goes On. Cengage. ISBN 978-1133712602.
- Carilli, Theresa; Campbell, Jane (2005). Women and the Media: Diverse Perspectives. University Press of America. ISBN 0761830405.
- Cashmore, Ellis (2022). The Destruction and Creation of Michael Jackson. Bloomsbury Publishing. ISBN 978-1501363634.
- Cayton, Mary Kupiec (1993). Encyclopedia of American Social History. Vol. 3. Scribner. ISBN 0684192462.
- Chan, Kwok-Bun (2014). Chinese Entertainment. Taylor & Francis. ISBN 978-1317977995.
- Chatzipapatheodoridis, Constantine (2021). The Music Diva Spectacle. Intellect Books. ISBN 978-1789384383.
- Collin, Richard Oliver; Martin, Pamela (2012). An Introduction to World Politics: Conflict and Consensus on a Small Planet. Rowman & Littlefield Publishers. ISBN 978-1442218031.
- Cornwell, Grant Hermans; Stoddard, Eve Walsh (2001). Global Multiculturalism: Comparative Perspectives on Ethnicity, Race, and Nation. Rowman & Littlefield. ISBN 0742508838.
- Christgau, Robert (2000). Grown Up All Wrong. Harvard University Press. ISBN 0674003829.
- Clarke, Robert (2020). Celebrity Colonialism. Cambridge Scholars Publishing. ISBN 978-1527554757.
- Clawson, Patrick (1994). Iran's Strategic Intentions and Capabilities. National Defense University. ISBN 0788136771.
- Cross, Mary (2007). Madonna: A Biography. Greenwood Publishing Group. ISBN 978-0-313-33811-3.
- Cvetkovich, Ann (2018). Articulating The Global And The Local: Globalization And Cultural Studies. Taylor & Francis. ISBN 978-0429981814.
- D'Acierno, Pellegrino; Leonard, George J. (1998). The Italian American Heritage. Taylor & Francis. ISBN 0815303807.
- Doty, William G. (2000). Mythography: The Study of Myths and Rituals. University of Alabama Press. ISBN 0817310061.
- Ebert, Roger (1993). Roger Ebert's Video Companion, 1994. Andrews McMeel Publishing. ISBN 0836262441.
- Edmondson, Jacqueline (2013). Music in American Life: A-C. Greenwood. ISBN 978-0313393471.
- Encyclopædia Britannica (2008). Britannica Guide to 100 Most Influential Americans. Encyclopaedia Britannica, Inc. ISBN 978-1593398576.
- Evans, Marshawn (2013). S.K.I.R.T.S in the Boardroom. Wiley. ISBN 978-1118747247.
- Faith, Karlene; Wasserlein, Frances (1997). Madonna, Bawdy & Soul. University of Toronto Press. ISBN 0-802-04208-2.
- Fast, Susan; Jennex, Craig (2019). Popular Music and the Politics of Hope: Queer and Feminist Interventions. Routledge. ISBN 978-1351677813.
- Ferraro, Thomas J. (2005). Feeling Italian: The Art of Ethnicity in America. NYU Press. ISBN 0814728391.
- Fouz-Hernández, Santiago; Jarman-Ivens, Freya (2004). Madonna's Drowned Worlds: New Approaches to her Cultural Transformations, 1983-2003. Routledge. ISBN 1351559540.
- Fuller, L. (2006). Sport, Rhetoric, and Gender: Historical Perspectives and Media Representations. Palgrave Macmillan. ISBN 0230600751.
- Gardner, Abigail (2016). 'Rock On': Women, Ageing and Popular Music. Routledge. ISBN 978-1317189091.
- Geczy, Adam; Karaminas, Vicki (2021). Gaga Aesthetics: Art, Fashion, Popular Culture, and the Up-Ending of Tradition. Bloomsbury Publishing. ISBN 978-1350102712.
- Gnojewski, Carol (2007). Madonna: Express Yourself. Enslow Publishers. ISBN 978-0766024427.
- Gnojewski, Carol (2017). Madonna: Fighting for Self-Expression. Enslow Publishers. ISBN 978-0766095526.
- González, Ana Marta [in Spanish] (2009). Ficción e identidad. Ensayos de cultura postmoderna. Ediciones Rialp. ISBN 978-84-321-3728-0.
- Gopinath, Gayatri (2005). Impossible Desires: Queer Diasporas and South Asian Public Cultures. Duke University Press. ISBN 0822386534.
- Graham-Jones, Jean (2014). Evita, Inevitably: Performing Argentina's Female Icons Before and After Eva Perón. University of Michigan Press. ISBN 978-0-4720-5233-2.
- Group of Lisbon (1995). Limits to Competition. MIT Press. ISBN 0-262-07164-9.
- Guilbert, Georges-Claude (2015). Madonna as Postmodern Myth. McFarland. ISBN 978-0-786-48071-5.
- Guttman, Ariel; Guttman, Gail; Johnson, Kenneth (2011). Mythic Astrology Applied: Personal Healing Through the Planets. Llewellyn Worldwide. ISBN 978-0-7387-0425-8.
- Hall, Dennis; Hall, Susan G (2006). American Icons. Greenwood Publishing Group. ISBN 978-0-275-98431-1.
- Haworth, Catherine; Colton, Lisa (2016). Gender, Age and Musical Creativity. Taylor & Francis. ISBN 978-1317130062.
- Held, David (1999). Global Transformations: Politics, Economics and Culture. Stanford University Press. ISBN 0-8047-3627-8.
- Hepworth, David (2017). Uncommon People: The Rise and Fall of The Rock Stars. Henry Holt and Company. ISBN 978-1-250-12413-5.
- Hoesterey, Ingeborg (2001). Pastiche: Cultural Memory in Art, Film, Literature. Indiana University Press. ISBN 0253338808.
- Hyder, Rehan (2017). Brimful of Asia: Negotiating Ethnicity on the UK Music Scene. Routledge. ISBN 978-1351218085.
- Jeansonne, Glen (2006). A Time of Paradox: America Since 1890. Rowman & Littlefield Publishers. ISBN 1461636388.
- Jermyn, Deborah (2016). Female Celebrity and Ageing: Back in the Spotlight. Taylor & Francis. ISBN 978-1134924868.
- Jones, Dylan (2021). Shiny and New: Ten Moments of Pop Genius that Defined the '80s. Hachette. ISBN 978-1474620086.
- Kallenborn, Roland (2016). Implications and Consequences of Anthropogenic Pollution in Polar Environments. Springer Science+Business Media. ISBN 978-3-642-12315-3.
- Kaplan, Arie (2012). American Pop: Hit Makers, Superstars, and Dance Revolutionaries. Twenty-First Century Books. ISBN 978-1-4677-0148-8.
- Karsh, David (2003). Israel: Israel in the international arena. Frank Cass. ISBN 1-317-87329-7.
- Kellner, Douglas (2003). Media Spectacle. Psychology Press. ISBN 041526829X.
- Kellner, Douglas; Hammer, Rhonda (2009). Media/cultural Studies: Critical Approaches. Peter Lang. ISBN 978-0-8204-9526-2.
- Khanna, Parag (2011). How to Run the World: Charting a Course to the Next Renaissance. Random House. ISBN 978-0679604280.
- Kinder, Marsha (1997). Blood Cinema: The Reconstruction of National Identity in Spain. University of California Press. ISBN 0520913477.
- Klein, Aaron (2007). Schmoozing With Terrorists: From Hollywood to the Holy Land, Jihadists Reveal Their Global Plans-- to a Jew!. WND Books. ISBN 978-0-9790451-2-7.
- Landrum, Gene N. (1994). Profiles of Female Genius: Thirteen Creative Women who Changed the World. Prometheus Books. ISBN 0-87975-892-9.
- Layton, Lynne (2013). Who's That Girl? Who's That Boy?: Clinical Practice Meets Postmodern Gender Theory. Routledge. ISBN 978-1135891435.
- Leibetseder, Doris (2016). Queer Tracks: Subversive Strategies in Rock and Pop Music. Taylor & Francis. ISBN 978-1317072584.
- Lenig, Stuart (2010). The Twisted Tale of Glam Rock. ABC-CLIO. ISBN 978-0313379871.
- Lockard, Craig A. (2011). Societies, networks, and transitions: a global history. Cengage. ISBN 978-0495897309.
- Longhurst, Brian (2007). Popular Music and Society. Wiley. ISBN 978-0745631622.
- Lysloff, René T. A.; Gay, Leslie C. Jr. (2013). Ross, Andrew (ed.). Music and Technoculture. Wesleyan University Press. ISBN 978-0819574411.
- Magill, Frank Northen (1998). Chronology of Twentieth-century History. Vol. 2. Fitzroy Dearborn Publishers. ISBN 1-884964-66-4.
- MacLeod, Sean (2015). Leaders of the Pack: Girl Groups of the 1960s and Their Influence on Popular Culture in Britain and America. Rowman & Littlefield. ISBN 978-1442252028.
- Marsh, Dave; Bernard, James (1994). New Book of Rock Lists. Simon and Schuster. ISBN 0671787004.
- McAleer, Dave (2004). Hit Singles: Top 20 Charts from 1954 to the Present Day. Hal Leonard Corporation. ISBN 0879308087.
- McCall, Pete (2021). Ageless Intensity: High-Intensity Workouts to Slow the Aging Process. Human Kinetics. ISBN 978-1718200760.
- McClary, Susan (2017). Reading Music: Selected Essays. Routledge. ISBN 978-1351552219.
- McLeod, Ken (2013). We are the Champions: The Politics of Sports and Popular Music. Ashgate Publishing. ISBN 978-1409494508.
- McWhirter, Norris; McFarlan, Donald (1989). The Guinness book of records: 1989. Guinness Pub. ISBN 0851128785.
- Mordden, Ethan (2016). When Broadway Went to Hollywood. Oxford University Press. ISBN 978-0199395422.
- Morley, Paul (2015). Words & Music: A History of Pop in the Shape of a City. Bloomsbury Publishing. ISBN 978-1408864340.
- Morton, Andrew (2001). Madonna. Macmillan Publishers. ISBN 0-312-98310-7.
- Munford, Rebecca; Waters, Melanie (2014). Feminism and Popular Culture: Investigating the Postfeminist Mystique. Rutgers University Press. ISBN 978-0813567426.
- National Geographic Books (2008). Axelrod, Alan (ed.). 1001 People Who Made America. National Geographic Society. ISBN 978-1426202681.
- Negrón-Muntaner, Frances (2004). Boricua Pop. NYU Press. ISBN 0814758789.
- Oberoi, Roopinder; Halsall, Jamie P. (2018). Revisiting Globalization: From a Borderless to a Gated Globe. Springer Publishing. ISBN 978-3-319-79123-4.
- O'Brien, Lucy (2007). Madonna: Like an Icon. Bantam Press. ISBN 978-0-593-05547-2.
- Oleksy, Elżbieta H.; Rydzewska, Joanna (2004). Representing Gender in Cultures. Peter Lang. ISBN 0-820-46546-1.
- Palmer, Landon (2020). Rock Star/Movie Star: Power and Performance in Cinematic Rock Stardom. Oxford University Press. ISBN 978-0190888404.
- Partridge, Christopher (2017). The Bloomsbury Handbook of Religion and Popular Music. Bloomsbury Publishing. ISBN 978-1474237352.
- Parish, James Robert; Pitts, Michael R. (2003). Hollywood Songsters: Garland to O'Connor. Routledge. ISBN 0415943337.
- Pop, Doru (2018). The Age of Promiscuity: Narrative and Mythological Meme Mutations in Contemporary Cinema and Popular Culture. Rowman & Littlefield. ISBN 978-1498580618.
- Quartz, Steven; Asp, Anette (2015). Cool: How the Brain's Hidden Quest for Cool Drives Our Economy and Shapes Our World. Farrar, Straus and Giroux. ISBN 978-1429944182.
- Ram, Uri (2013). The Globalization of Israel: McWorld in Tel Aviv, Jihad in Jerusalem. Routledge. ISBN 978-1135926816.
- Robb, Alice Robb (2018). Why We Dream: The Science, Creativity and Transformative Power of Dreams. Pan Macmillan. ISBN 978-1509836253.
- Rodman, Gilbert B. (1996). Elvis after Elvis: The Posthumous Career of a Living Legend. Routledge. ISBN 0415110025.
- Roediger, David R. (2003). Colored White: Transcending the Racial Past. University of California Press. ISBN 0520240707.
- Rosentreter, Roger L. (2013). Michigan: A History of Explorers, Entrepreneurs, and Everyday People. University of Michigan Press. ISBN 978-0472051908.
- Ruggiero, Vincent Ryan (1994). Warning: Nonsense is Destroying America. Thomas Nelson. ISBN 0840796781.
- Ruthven, Malise (2004). A Fury for God: The Islamist Attack on America. Granta Books. ISBN 1862075735.
- Seery, John E. (2018). Political Theory for Mortals: Shades of Justice, Images of Death. Cornell University Press. ISBN 978-1501718311.
- Sexton, Adam (1993). Desperately Seeking Madonna: in search of the meaning of the world's most famous woman. ABC-CLIO. ISBN 0385306881.
- Schönherr, Johannes (2012). North Korean Cinema: A History. McFarland. ISBN 978-0786490523.
- Schuler, Catherine (2013). Women in Russian Theatre: The Actress in the Silver Age. Taylor & Francis. ISBN 978-1136155901.
- Schwichtenberg, Cathy (1993). The Madonna connection. Westview Press. ISBN 0813313961.
- Shuker, Roy (2002). Popular Music: The Key Concepts. Taylor & Francis. ISBN 1134453701.
- Shuker, Roy (2013). Understanding Popular Music. Routledge. ISBN 978-1134564798.
- Sickels, Robert C. (2013). 100 Entertainers Who Changed America: An Encyclopedia of Pop Culture Luminaries. ABC-CLIO. ISBN 978-1-59884-831-1.
- Sim, Stuart (2001). The Routledge Companion to Postmodernism. Routledge. ISBN 0415243076.
- Sirvaitis, Karen (2010). The European American Experience. Twenty-First Century Books. ISBN 978-0761363590.
- Skiena, Steven; Ward, Charles B. (2014). Who's Bigger?: Where Historical Figures Really Rank. Cambridge University Press. ISBN 978-1107041370.
- Smith, Chris (2009). 101 Albums That Changed Popular Music. Oxford University Press. ISBN 978-0-19-537371-4.
- Smit, Christopher R. (2017). Michael Jackson: Grasping the Spectacle. Taylor & Francis. ISBN 978-1351558341.
- Smith, Roy; El-Anis, Imad; Farrands, Christopher (2014). The globalisation debate. Routledge. ISBN 978-1-317-87329-7.
- Spignesi, Stephen J.; Vena, Michael (1998). The Italian 100: A Ranking of the Most Influential Cultural, Scientific, and Political Figures, Past and Present. Carol Publishing Group. ISBN 0806518219.
- Stange, Mary Zeiss; Oyster, Carol K.; Sloan, Jane E. (2011). Encyclopedia of Women in Today's World. Vol. 1. SAGE Publishing. ISBN 978-1-4129-7685-5.
- Stever, Gayle (2018). The Psychology of Celebrity. Routledge. ISBN 978-1351252089.
- Stuart, Andrea (1996). Showgirls. J. Cape. ISBN 0-224-03615-7.
- Sweeney, Kathleen (2008). Maiden USA: Girl Icons Come of Age. Peter Lang. ISBN 978-0820481975.
- Tasker, Yvonne (2002). Working Girls. Taylor & Francis. ISBN 1-134-82660-5.
- Tester, Keith (2010). Humanitarianism and Modern Culture. Pennsylvania State University Press. ISBN 978-0271037356.
- Troy, Gil (2013). Morning in America: How Ronald Reagan Invented the 1980's. Princeton University Press. ISBN 978-1400849307.
- Viñuela, Eduardo (2018). Bitch she's Madonna: la reina del pop en la cultura contemporánea. Dos Bigotes. ISBN 978-8494796333.
- Walker, W. Richard; Herrmann, Douglas J. (2004). Cognitive Technology: Essays on the Transformation of Thought and Society. McFarland. ISBN 0786484535.
- Walters, Suzanna Danuta (1995b). Material Girls: Making Sense of Feminist Cultural Theory. University of California Press. ISBN 0520089782.
- Weissman, Dick (2010). Talkin' 'Bout a Revolution: Music and Social Change in America. Rowman & Littlefield. ISBN 978-1476854533.
- Wikse, Maria (2006). Materialisations of a Woman Writer: Investigating Janet Frame's Biographical Legend. Peter Lang. ISBN 3-03910-705-4.
- Whelehan, Imelda; Gwynne, Joel (2014). Ageing, Popular Culture and Contemporary Feminism. Palgrave Macmillan. ISBN 978-1-137-37653-4.
- Zara, Christopher (2012). Tortured Artists. Adams Media. ISBN 978-1440532115.
