= Madonna in media =

Aspect of Madonna's career

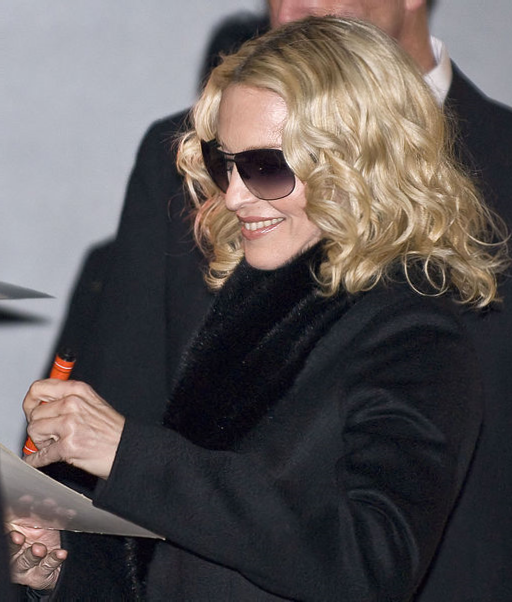
Madonna during the Berlinale in 2008

American entertainer Madonna debuted in media in the early 1980s. Explorations of her image and rise to popularity have expanded to academic and media studies, at times going beyond Madonna's own career with some noting a broader impact on celebrity culture.

== Academic analysis ==
[...] Madonna had reached such staggering celebrity that scholarly and popular assessments of the meaning of her work for the future of feminism, for the sexual values of the young [...] indeed for virtually any issue one might imagine, had become a growth industry.

— Angela G. Dorenkamp (1995)

Madonna has often been regarded as a cultural figure whose significance extends beyond music. In 1996, writer Martha Bayles noted that it was "in the extramusical realm that Madonna really made her name". In 2017, University of Central Florida professor Thomas Harrison noted that while contemporaries such as Cyndi Lauper emerged as "a singer and songwriter first and pop culture icon second; with Madonna, it was largely the opposite".

The German newspaper Süddeutsche Zeitung commented in 2010 that discussions surrounding Madonna have never been confined to tabloid media alone. Academically, she has been the subject of analysis within fields such as media studies and communication studies, particularly following her rise to celebrity status in the late 20th century, which "spurred considerable scholarship". In 1993, cultural theorist Annalee Newitz summarized Madonna's broad impact, stating: "Fields from theology to queer studies have written literally volumes on what Madonna's stardom means for gender relations, for American culture, and for the future".

In 2016, sociologist Ellis Cashmore argued that Madonna effectively exploited the expansion of media opportunities to build her public persona. Similarly, author José Igor Prieto-Arranz described her as more of a global multimedia phenomenon than a traditional singer. Author Tim Delaney emphasized that it was often her "outrageous behaviour" that "set the tone for public discourse and analysis".

Scholars have also examined how Madonna is represented and discussed within media discourse. Professor Ann Cvetkovich argued that the academic study of figures like Madonna is vital, not only because she reflects the "global reach of media culture", but also because she embodies a variety of social and cultural dynamics that are central to contemporary identity and representation.

== Media ubiquity ==
=== Background ===
[With her media appearances] The singer "would be more culturally significant than most of the people who have changed the course of history or thought"

— Spanish philosopher Ana Marta González on Madonna's media coverage perspective (2009)

The authors of Media Studies: The Essential Resource (2004), called "cultural forms" and "media events" the reception, including "media talk" when a new Madonna album came out. Madonna has continue to spark conversations online since early on, including debates on Internet when she released American Life (2003), and during her Confessions Tour in 2006. In 2023, Michelle Orange from New York magazine stated that she innovated the "female mainstream avant-pop performance-artist superstar". Peter Robinson describes for The Guardian: "Media training is a part of any sensible new popstar's pre-launch fitness regime, but Madonna didn't need it. She wrote the bloody book on it".

Rolling Stone Spain considered Madonna as the "master" of viral pop, further explaining that she impacted multiple media formats, an accomplishment they compared to that of the Beatles. In 2018, Marissa G. Muller similarly discussed for W how Madonna helped create the idea of "monocultural —now known as viral—" proto-viral moments back in the 20th century, including in the modern Internet, citing her MTV Video Music Awards in 2003. In 2015, Vulture's Lindsay Zoladz wrote that if the Internet is our modern religion, then Madonna is its Old Testament God.

=== Traditional media and Internet age ===
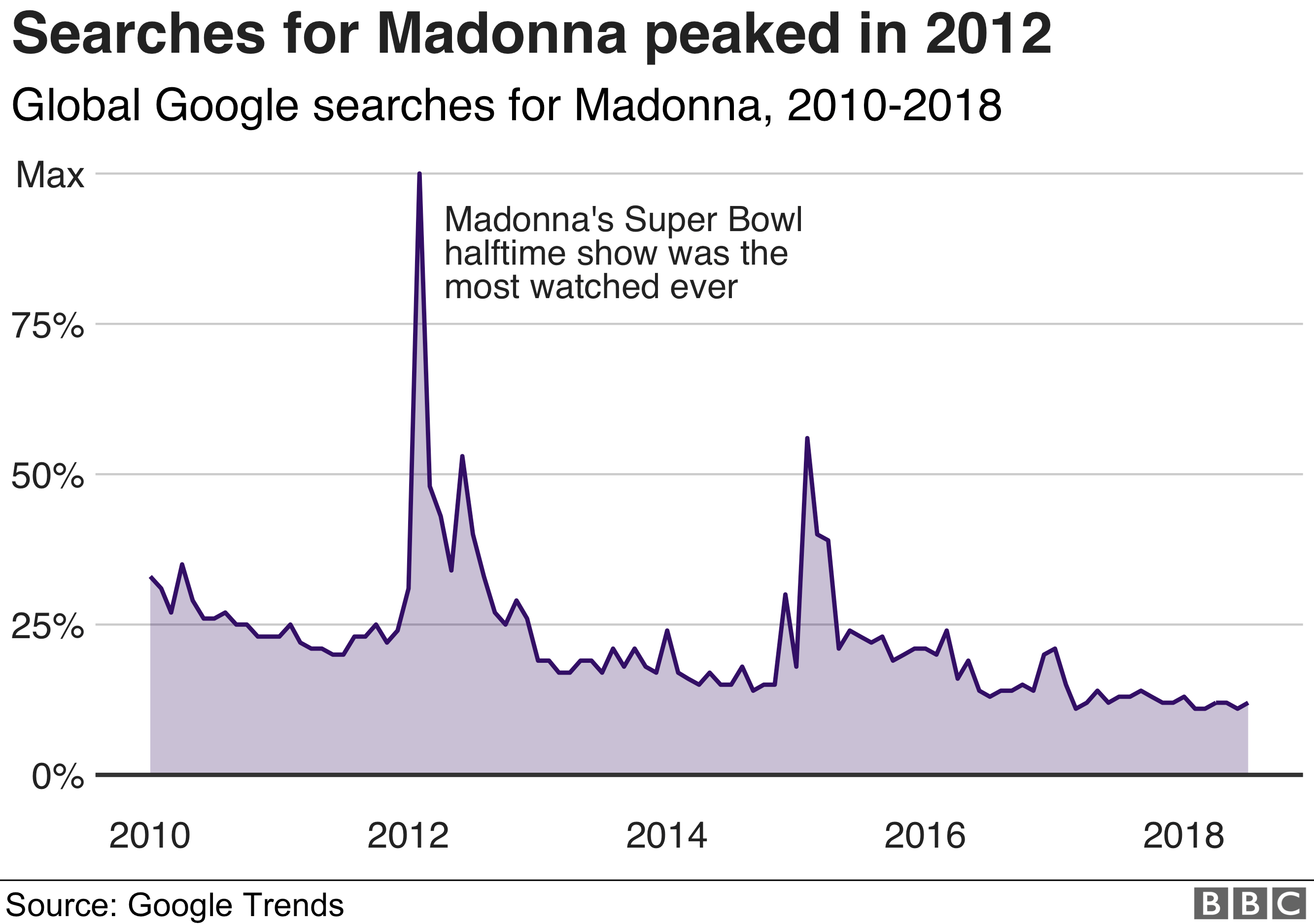
Madonna's global Google Searches during 2010—2018

The New York Times stated in 2023: She has been "ubiquitous but also astonishing, when you consider the usual fleeting arc of pop stardom". Contemporary considerations include Music Week's commentary in 1992, saying "anything she does is news". Mark Bego similarly described how her every move was "considered front page news". He also described how "not since the days of Marilyn Monroe had a blonde American performer caused such a stir". As a constant headline creator, many of her moves were also labeled as "news-making events" back then. The authors of Madonnarama (1993), wrote that she has come to occupy that "large public media attention" that she functions rather like what environmentalists call a "megafauna". In sum, she garnered "maximum exposure" through magazines, newspapers, and "any other medium possible". After reviewing the end of the 20th century with Madonna, academic William G. Doty described in Mythography (2000), that "nor can any late-twentieth-century theory satisfactorily explain the momentary appeal" of Madonna.

Before the Internet, Matthew Jacobs from HuffPost considered that only Michael Jackson rivaled her media coverage, labeling hers a "feat" without of today "ever-rapid news cycle". In Cashmore's words, "she got more saturation, media coverage than anyone, present and past". In Profiles of Female Genius (1994), the author said: "The press has in turn made Madonna the most visible, photographed, and debated female in modern times". Similar to Jacobs, Laura Craik from The Daily Telegraph said "before information was a quick Google away, Madonna was a rare and precious conduit, a woman who seemed plugged into the white-hot centre of the universe, yet all the while appearing to be her own current".

On Internet exposure, Frances Wasserlein on Karlene Faith's Madonna, Bawdy & Soul (1997), described her presence on the Net as billions of bytes devoted to her, on web sites "all over the world". Alina Simone described in Madonnaland (2016) her presence on the Internet as "crushing", further saying "trying to ingest it all, let alone wreath it in words, feels like trying to give the population of Indonesia a hug—a task further complicated by the fact that both are simultaneously growing".

== Fame ==
=== Critical and sizing discussions ===
Madonna's celebrity status was praised by some early authors for her other roles. Author Mark Bego said she turned it "a role unto itself". Music critic Robert Christgau echoed: "Celebrity is her true art". Her "megastardom" also made her a "person-turned-idea", wrote author Bill Friskics-Warren. Writing for The Observer in 2004, Barbara Ellen said, "Madonna has transcended pop stardom to become the first great reality show".

Speaking about her early fame, Christgau described it as so "far-reaching" that it is "difficult even to measure". Decades after her heyday, according to the Rock and Roll Hall of Fame in 2008, she is one of the most "recognizable names in the world" beyond music. In 2013, Liverpool John Moores University lecturer Ron Moy described her a "global pop star" whose notoriety has rendered her "one of the most recognisable human beings on the planet". In Madonna as Postmodern Myth (2002), French scholar Georges-Claude Guilbert explored how some "celebrities seeking publicity do not hesitate to use Madonna's name".

=== Female condition ===
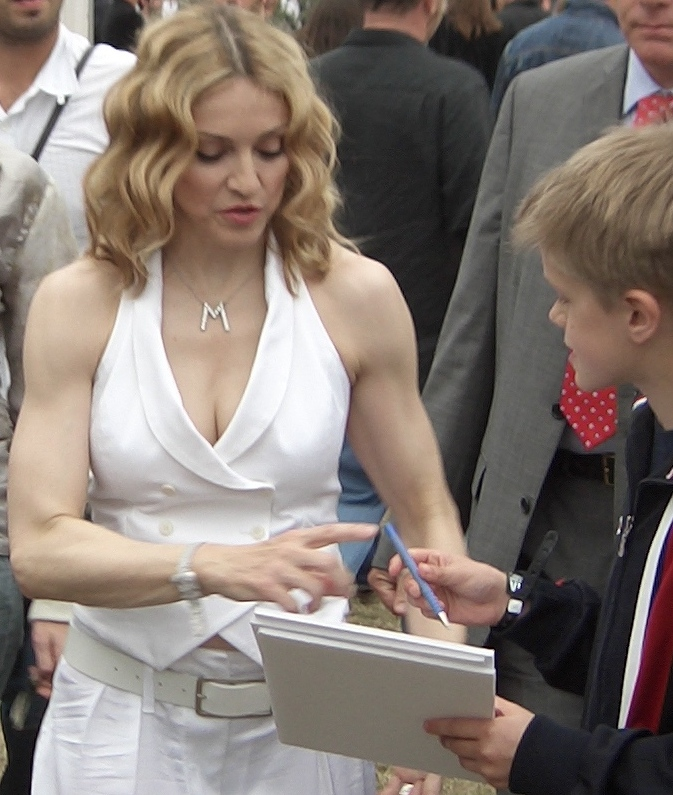
She was included among Paul Fraser Collectibles's Top 10 Most Valuable Living Autographs (2000–2014).

Madonna reached a high level of fame as a female artist. University of Leeds' Stan Hawkins considered she was "the first female solo artist to gain superstar status" in the 1980s. Commentator Gil Troy said she was "the 1980's dominant female star", and Arie Kaplan called her the most powerful female pop icon of the decade. She also emerged for others, including Hawkins, as a central female icon of the twentieth century. In MTV: The Making of a Revolution (1996), Madonna is called the "quintessential star of the 1980s and 1990s". Music critic Neil McCormick wrote for The Daily Telegraph in 2023:

There was no one like Madonna before Madonna. She was really the first female global superstar and had to fight for every inch of space she occupied. There had, of course, been huge female stars before (Barbra Streisand, Dolly Parton, Tina Turner and Diana Ross to name a few) but Madonna's success has been on a whole other scale, stamping her forceful character on music, dance, fashion, video, film and all the connective cultural tissue in between.

In 1995, American Photo magazine commented that "more than anyone else, Madonna challenged the terms of celebrity for women". In The Greenwood Encyclopedia of Rock History (2006), MaryAnn Janosik acknowledges Madonna's rise as a self-made star, saying she helped demonstrate to a large audience that "power is accessible to all, including women".

==== "Most famous woman" ====
It is not enough to have one, two or three personal transformations if you want to become and remain for decades perhaps the most famous woman in the world.

— Richard Koch (2020)

On a par with a very few media female icons, Madonna was both discussed or referred to as arguably "The Most Famous Women" in the world by multiple international publications and authors, spanning the 20th and 21st centuries. According to Mary Gabriel, she was prone to statements like "I'm going to be the most famous woman in the world". In 2020, Thomas Ferraro similarly referred "she seemed to have been intent on becoming the most famous woman in the world, and then did". American journalist Vanessa Grigoriadis commented for The New York Times in 2019: "The conventional wisdom is that Madonna became more famous than everyone else because she was dying to became famous".

Guilbert asserts in Madonna as Postmodern Myth (2002): "In the American, British, Australian, and French press [...], it is generally taken for granted that Madonna is the most famous female in the world". In American Icons (2006), associated professor Diane Pecknold echoed the "claim to distinction as 'the world's most famous women' seems to require no defense". In 2008, economist Robert M. Grant referred to her as "the best known woman on the planet". Other authors including Simon Frith (1993), Frances Negrón-Muntaner (2004), and Jancee Dunn (2012) also discussed or referred to Madonnas as arguably the most famous woman. In 2018, Matt Cain from The Daily Telegraph called her "one of the most famous women ever to have lived". In Madonna (2001), Andrew Morton referred to her as "the most wanted woman in the world".

On her role as artist, in Madonnaland (2016), Alina Simone named her "the most famous female performer of all time". In Myth, Mind and the Screen (2001), John Izod considered her as "possibly the most famous female media star of her epoch".

=== Impact on celebrity culture ===
In 1999, considering entertainers with the most impact in the last 50 years, Entertainment Weekly staffers called herthe "epitome of the modern entertainer". Madonna introduced or reinforced various connotations in celebrity culture. Sociologist Ellis Cashmore says she "didn't single handedly [alter] star celebrity culture", but that she effected a change in style and the manner in which stars engaged with the media. He also gave the singer credit for he usage of "scandal", something he describes that become "a holy grail for celebrities". Similarl, British art historian John A. Walker wrote in Art and Celebrity (2003) that her celebrity tactics "are now everywhere". In 2018, Billboard staffers declared that she was "the template for what a pop star could and should be".

Whelehan and Gwynne also considered her as an archetypal postfeminist pop icon. Australian scholars Imelda Whelehan and Joel Gwynne wrote in Ageing, Popular Culture and Contemporary Feminism (2014), that her expertise in attracting and maintaining the attention of the world's media "helped to redefine the nature of celebrity". In 2019, The A.V. Club called her "modern pop's original icon". In 2015, T. Cole Rachel from Pitchfork Media also agreed and stated "she devised the archetype of pop stardom as we know and understand it today". The same year, Elysa Gardner from USA Today held that "no single artist" was more crucial in shaping our modern view of celebrities.

In 2012, Erin Skarda wrote for Time magazine that "she essentially redefined what it meant to be famous in America". Peter Robinson felt "Madonna pretty much invented contemporary pop fame so there is a little bit of her in the DNA of every modern pop thing". In 2023, Brandon Sanchez from The Cut acknowledges Madonna's role for helping "standardized the script for the reception of —and debates surrounding— pop stars".

== Pop condition ==
Madonna's career was often measured in terms of relevancy and popularity. In 2018, Michele Yeo explained for Entertainment Tonight Canada that "much ink and cyber space have been devoted to debating" her "relevancy". She was also often measured with an expiration date; in 2001, Chuck Myers from the Sun Sentinel considered that "long ago, many detractors wrote off Madonna's staying power".

=== Discussions about permanency ===
As early as 1985, Madonna was labeled as "the hottest draw in show biz" by Time magazine. Years later, in Women Creating Lives (1994), Madonna's popularity was described as having crossed lines of "gender, race, class", and "even education".

Pop culture commentaries and analysis of her decline have been also addressed. A Denver Post correspondent commented in 2012, her permanence "at the center of things has come and gone". In the views of American authors and academics such as Lynn Spigel and Andrew Ferguson in the 1990s, her "real crime" was her own longevity. In 1996, British author Mark Watts wrote that the "rise and (perceived) decline of Madonna has gone, so to say, hand-in-hand with that of postmodern theory – but none the less pervasively influential for that". Also in the 1990s, Jean-Luc Godard said she "isn't popular, she's popularized. That's very different". Argentine writer Rodrigo Fresán commented in 2008, that "Madonna now lives off the shock wave of a Big Bang" describing her as a "dead star" but very "intelligent". In 2018, Cashmore said "thereafter, her presence might have faded, but her influence remained". Deborah Jermyn from University of Roehampton commented in 2016, that her "frequency is generally steady until key moments in her career produce intense spikes of activity". On the other hand, Jermyn also explored the "growing" proliferation of "negative discourses surrounding her continued body project to remain" in the stage.

Rolling Stone staffers acknowledged in 2021 her "ability to say at the center of pop culture for longer than nearly anyone". In the 2010s, during a panel head by Spaniard critic Víctor Lenore, Madonna was understood to be "the most influential female performer of popular culture" at that time. In 2015, Elysa Gardner from USA Today called her "our most durable pop star". Back in the 2000s, a Belfast Telegraph columnist Gail Walker commented "not even male icons have stayed at the front of popular culture the way she has", while business professor Oren Harari quoted a critic describing her as "the most durable pop symbol of her generation".

Madonna's responses: Madonna has responded various times, mainly to the criticisms of her permanency. Professor Robert Miklitsch, said she sardonically asked her critics in "Human Nature" about her longevity and controversies with the phrase: "Did I stay too long?". At the 2016 Billboard Women in Music, she told the audience: "I think the most controversial thing I have ever done is to stick around".

=== Longevity-success ===
In an industry where some artists don't last longer than a packet of chewing gum, Madonna has built a career of success and longevity that is unparalleled.

— David Thomas from MTV Australia (2013).

==== Background ====
Madonna debuted with many critics, including Robert Hilburn, Dave Marsh, and Paul Grain (Billboard), labeling her a one-hit wonder, and predicted a rapid decline. In a short span, Madonna perpetuated an image of a career-risker as she described various times how her career ended because she went "too far". On this, editor Jed La Lumiere commented: "Over the years, Madonna has walked a fine line between having gone too far, and getting her point across. To me she is the quintessential icon of 'you don't know until you try'". She survived her early critics, and Billboard recalled after naming her "Artist of the Decade" in 1989, that she "has always stayed one step ahead our expectations".

==== Timeline ====
The media began to address her longevity in the early 1990s. In 1991, Jon Pareles called her a "veteran" and her permanency was labeled as the "equivalent to five lifetimes in rock-star years" by a The Philadelphia Inquirer correspondent in 1992. The same year, the Australian newspaper The Canberra Times attributed her ability reinvent her image as the "secret" of her "longevity". In 2022, Helen Brown from the Financial Times explained the epoch by saying "average chart-life of a pop singer was two to six years, generally shorter for women that men". While there were performers with lengthy careers compared to Madonna, reviewers such as media scholar David Tetzlaff emphasized the nostalgia value, giving examples such as Elvis Presley, Liz Taylor, and even the Rolling Stones while noting the continued "hype" she generated staying "contemporary". In 1995, critic Gina Arnold compared her with two leading contemporary artists, saying "her longevity alone proves which one of those three artists truly altered the face of popular culture". In 1999, Thales de Menezes from Brazilian newspaper Folha de S.Paulo considered her a "rare case" of a lasting relationship with success. In the next decades, authors had similar discussions, including Jennifer Egan (2002) and LZ Granderson (2012).

Young women performers, who feared their careers would reach an expiration date when they were in their thirties, were inspired [...] With Re-Invention, they had a template for their later years. The Sugababe's Heidi Range said, "She's the ultimate role model for a woman in the music industry".

— Mary Gabriel (2023)

Cultural impact

Various sectors praised her multi-decade success and longevity, including the business community. Some reviewers praised it as depending little on nostalgia and comeback value. In Profiles of Female Genius (1994), the author asserted: "Her success has made her the most visible show business personality of the era, and arguably of the century". By 2013, professor Roy Shuker defined that "the continued success of Madonna provides a fascinating case study" in popular music. Tony Sclafani from MSNBC considered, by 2008, that her successive hit records "opened people's minds as to how successful a female artist could be". Professor Thomas Harrison, similarly claimed she "had a profound impact" on what artists needed to do to be successful in the 1980s and the decades afterward. Even more, Time magazine commented in 2010 that "every pop star" of the past two or three decades, "has Madonna to thank in some part for his or her success". Mary Cross similarly wrote in Madonna: A Biography (2007), "new pop icons [...] owe Madonna a debt of thanks for the template she forged". Cashmore especially praised the fact that she both epitomized and helped usher in an age in which the epithets "shocking", "disgusting", or "filthy" didn't presage "the end of a career".

=== Cultural estimations ===
Referring to the 1980s, media historian James L. Baughman called her "nation's most popular female singer". In 2008, The Seattle Times regarded her as "the most popular female singer of her generation". In Media Culture (2003), Douglas Kellner similarly recognized her as "the most popular woman entertainer of her era" and perhaps "of all time".

Despite ephemeral condition and perceptions of success, Madonna was able to sustain, for decades, being recognized critically and culturally for her success and longevity. For instance, she was called "the most successful female solo pop performer ever" by Women's Review on 1986 or so before. The Guinness Book of World Records referred to her as the "most successful" female artist or female solo artist spanning both 20th and 21st centuries. In 2020, Journal of Business Research collaborators estimated her as "probably the most successful female music artist ever" in several terms. In 2015, gender scholar Laura Viñuela in a Madonna class at University of Oviedo felt she was "the only woman who has such a long and massively successful career" in music world up that point. British musicologist David Nicholls also suggested in late 1990s: "Madonna became the most successful woman in music history by skillfully evoking, inflecting, and exploiting the tensions implicit in a variety of stereotypes and images of women".

== Print media ==
=== Newsstands ===
Madonna's ubiquity on newsstands (mainly on magazine covers) was commented on, leading a scholar to describe in the early 1990s that "this alone makes Madonna a phenomenon worthy of analysis". Bego said that magazines or calendars "sell out in record numbers when her name or likeness is on them". According to the author of Madonna: Queen of The World (2002), Madonna regularly sold "huge amounts" of newspapers and magazines, with other media often "wanting to duck into the pot of gold she creates".

==== Magazine and calendars ====
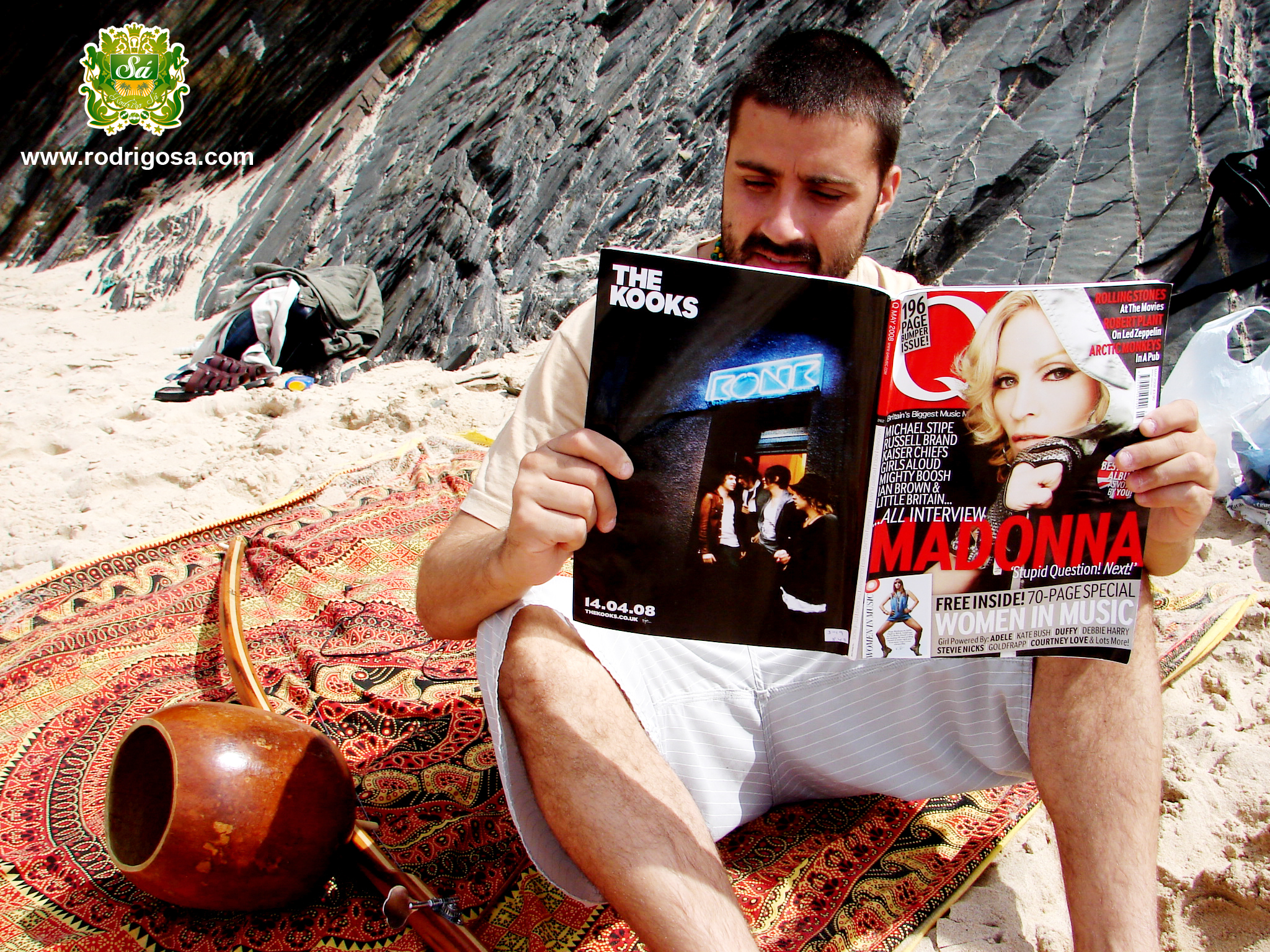
Brazilian singer Rodrigo Sá, holding a magazine in which Madonna cover appears for Q

As of 2020, Madonna had graced the covers of an estimated 4,700 magazines worldwide, ranging from fan magazines to high-fashion periodicals weighing six pounds. Cindy Crawford and Madonna were the most featured cover girls of the 1980s and 1990s. Commenting on the 1980s, media historian James L. Baughman said: "It was hard to find a magazine rack in the late 1980s that did not have one or mores periodicals with her picture gracing the cover". In 1989, she was the most popular and best-selling pin-up girl in Singapore. In 1992 alone, Madonna was the most commercial cover girl in the U.S. More people picked up her cover in 1992 on Entertainment Weekly that any other of their issues that year.

Sales include her debut in American Vogue in 1989, which was seen by its director Anna Wintour as "something extraordinary, like forty percent". Her March 1998 Vanity Fair cover titled "Madonna and Child" was among the best-selling covers of 1998, with editor Graydon Carter commenting that "Madonna always sells phenomenally well". Infobae noted how she has been featured in many of their international editions, selling out its copies in matters of days.

Her cover issue for W in 2003, titled X-STaTIC PRo=Cess, became the magazine's best-selling edition. That same year, a celebrity calendar firm in the UK placed her third among the best-selling woman in their 25th anniversary issue. She was also ranked as having the all-time fifth-bestselling female celebrity calendar on Amazon UK in 2011. She adorned magazines' special anniversary covers. To celebrate their 50th anniversary, Cosmopolitan had her in four issues. She graced a special cover highlighting the 150th anniversary of Harper's Bazaar. Commemorating their seventh anniversary, the staff of Spin highlighted two Madonna's covers in their own narrative of Genesis creation.

=== Madonna's authorship ===
Landon Palmer, professor at the University of Alabama, comments that her impact on popular culture includes the publishing realm. Madonna herself had been inspired by diverse poets and authors, developing an "intense interest in poetry," while many of her songs have roots in poetry and philosophy.

Madonna's first book, Sex, had the largest initial release of any illustrated book and remains as one of the most in-demand out-of-print publications of all time, according to Rolling Stone in 2022. Two of her children's books are among the largest publishing titles in history by its number of translations. Her The English Roses itself had the largest simultaneous multi-language debut for a book, with a target of more than 100 countries and 30 languages. It became the fastest-selling picture book by a debuting children's author, according to the South China Morning Post.

=== Influence on others ===
Madonna contributed to people taking an interest in Rumi's poetry, according to publisher DK. Novelists including Paulo Coelho and Lynne Truss have expressed admiration for her. With her success in children's literature, Ed Pilkington, from The Guardian, felt that she "lured a host of other celebrities and publishers into the [children's book] market".

Many authors have developed an interest in the subject of Madonna. In the 1990s, biographer Adam Sexton expressed that "an author can't even write a book-length essay on the writer he's obsessed by without mentioning Madonna's name". "Cut Madonna, and ink comes out", wrote a Time magazine contributor.

A number of authors and editors have cited Madonna as an influence. Having been an influence for him, Matthew Rettenmund made his publishing career debut by writing about her in 1995. Italian writer Francesco Falconi cited her as an influence and made his non-fictional debut with a biography of Madonna in 2011. Australian editor Marc Andrews, former contributor for Mediaweek was inspired by both Madonna and Kylie Minogue to transition from local to international coverage in the early 2020s. Madonna and Me (2012) by Jessica Valenti and Laura Barcella, as noted critics Eric Weisbard and Steven Hyden, is a book about dozens of women writers tracing their relationship with Madonna over the years. Writers and journalists have dedicated articles discussing Madonna's influence on them, including Natalia Mardero and two 2018's articles from the Belfast Telegraph and HuffPost. A publication even referred to Mardero as Madonna's "goddaughter".

Associate professor Diane Pecknold, in American Icons (2006), also notes that Madonna helped popularize words and phrases in the English lexicon, including the term "wannabe", and Desesperately Seeking [...]. People staffers said she "coined" the term for "Get rid of it".

== Visual media ==
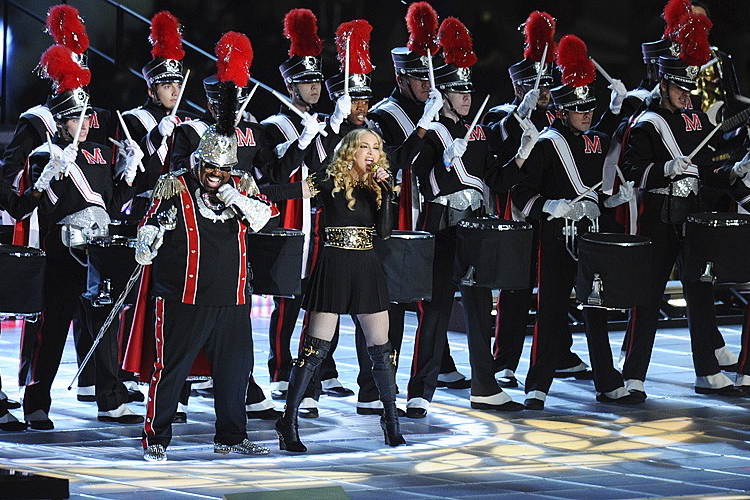
Madonna with CeeLo Green and the Center Grove High School drum line during the 2012 halftime show

Her presence on TV also achieved record ratings, including then the highest-rated for The Arsenio Hall Show in 1990, and HBO's then-most-watched nonsports event, with the broadcast of the Blond Ambition World Tour Live. Madonna's halftime show of 2012 became the most-watched in the event's history at that point, and remains one of the 10 most-watched as of 2023.

=== VH1 ===
Madonna was an important figure for VH1; she was called one of VH1's all-time top artists who personified the VH1 audience. In 1995, she participated, along with Sting and Sheryl Crow, in the channel's most important consumer advertising campaign since the network's launch in 1985. The network, of 50 million households by that time, said that her presence in the campaign "lends undeniable star power to the spots" and also "imbues the network with the kind of credibility".

=== MTV ===
[She] gave the MTV Video Music Awards a still-standing reputation as home to the most shocking moments ever seen on an awards show [and] planted MTV's flag firmly in the pop culture landscape. (Thanks, Madge!).

— MTV Staff on Madonna (c. 2008).

Madonna's impact on MTV was significant, on a par with Michael Jackson. Arie Kaplan claims that "she was the first artist to really use MTV to establish her popularity". The rise of MTV and Madonna were described as nearly "synonymous", and more than one author considered it a "symbiosis", including professor Ian Inglis. Both had contributed substantially to each other's success, with Mark Bego saying, "Madonna helped make MTV as much as [MTV] helped make her". A Rolling Stone editor commented, as Madonna morphed into "the world's most famous woman, so, too, did MTV evolve into a sleek superpower".

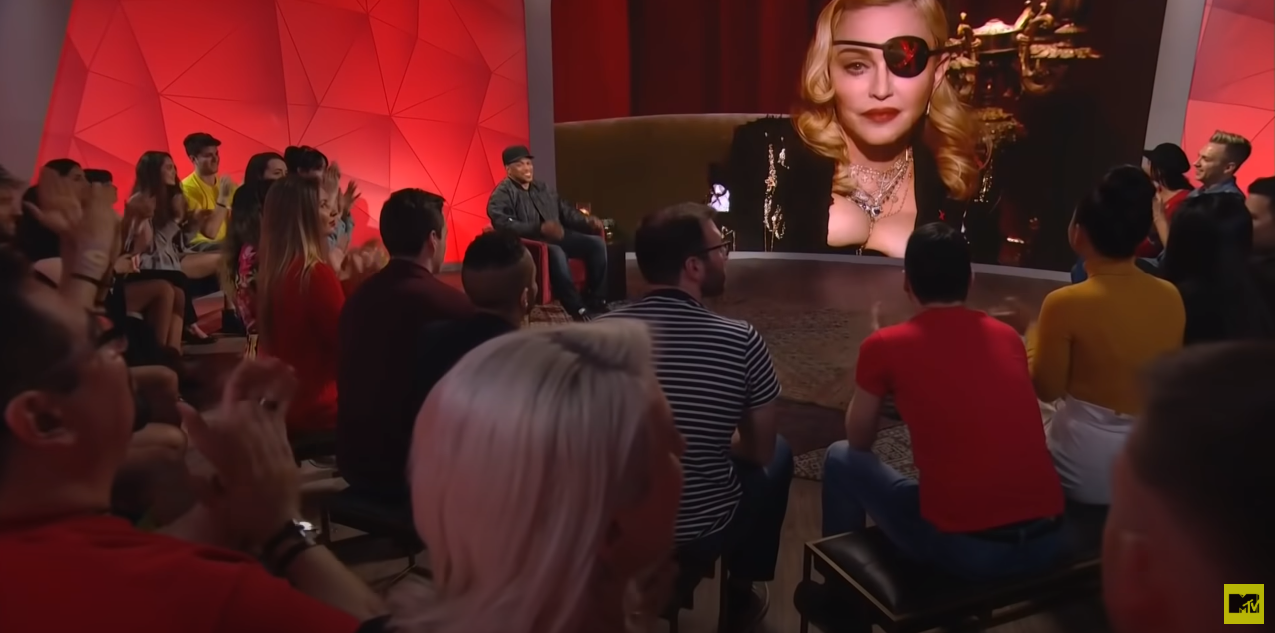
Madonna during a MTV International interview in 2019

In 2019, Rolling Stone staffers, including Bilge Ebiri and Maura Johnston, considered "no artist conquered the medium" like her, with her videos defining the MTV era and changing "pop culture forever". "Quite simply there was no one else like her", stated Carrie Havranek in Women Icons of Popular Music (2009). Associate professor Diane Pecknold, called her the "MTV ideal". Biographer Chris Dicker stated she transceded her "MTV persona", while other journalists stated she is "the first pop star of the MTV era to remain prolific at 60".

According to The New York Times in 2018, Madonna gave the network more media headlines than any other artist. Publications, including The New York Times and MTV itself, have agreed that Madonna set the tone for the MTV Video Music Awards for decades. Inglis, in a lengthy exploration, concludes that the more important legacy of "Like a Virgin" is the "legitimacy it lent to MTV at a time when MTV was trying to convince the world of the worthiness of music video". However, writing for National Review in 2015, David French was less impressed with how the channel has continued Madonna's 1984 formula when pop music is supposed to be about the "now", saying "since then, it's been all Madonna, all the time".

=== Cinema ===
Not only changed the way filmmakers explored the world of celebrity, but also had a profound impact on LGBTQ representation in film [... and became] the highest-grossing documentary of all time.

— Laura Martin from Esquire on Truth or Dare (2022).

Madonna's main impact on cinema was with Truth or Dare (1991); Guy Lodge from The Guardian named the movie her "most significant contribution to cinema". Joe Coscarelli from The New York Times said it "presaged the celeb-reality complex"; it shows the "real" Madonna and the "celebrity". That perception of a major star was something unusual at that point, as celebrities of Madonna's magnitude were often prized for their "distant mystique" not their "familiarity". The film is often referred as a precursor of reality television, as it was released one year before MTV's premiere of Real World, which is also cited as a pioneer of the format.

Madonna has inspired others in the industry. In the case of Mexican actress Salma Hayek, who told the Hispanic press that she took inspiration from Madonna for her role in Tale of Tales. Katy Perry did the same for her documentary concert film Katy Perry: Part of Me. Madonna even inspired the photorealism in Avatar (2009).

=== Criticisms ===
Madonna's rise to fame and celebrity status also garnered her criticism. In 1992, the Mexican newspaper El Siglo de Torreón called Madonna the best example of a self-advertising and overexposed star in media, while citing Mariah Carey as saying that appearing everywhere often damages the image of any artist. Media theorist Douglas Rushkoff explained that "Madonna's career has been more dependent on media backlash than it has on positive excitement or artistic achievement in the traditional sense". In the 1990s, an author described her "raunchy" reputation as having brought her fame and fortune while also calling her "Hollywood's most controversial star".

==== "Media manipulator" ====
Madonna was often positioned as a media manipulator, earning both highly positive comments and criticisms. Bego referred to her as the self-created "product of shameless media manipulation". Music critic J. D. Considine considered her "more media manipulator than musician". American journalist Josh Tyrangiel said that she reached her peak with the advent of her album Like a Prayer. In 1992, Mark Brown, a correspondent from the Telegraph Herald, called Madonna the "reigning queen". In response to being called a "media manipulator", Madonna was quoted as saying in 1991:

In the business world and in the world of politics, it's considered an asset. But in the entertainment industry, it's easier for people to deal with me by undermining my talents by saying that I'm not a good actress, not a good singer, not a good musician — or anything like that [...] They take everything else away from me, but give me that.

The label was not always accompanied by negative connotations. The Rock and Roll Hall of Fame stated in 2008 that, "no one in the pop realm has manipulated the media with such a savvy sense of self-promotion". For music critic Stephen Thomas Erlewine, public and media manipulation became "one of her greatest achievements". The authors of The Best Value Beauty Book Ever! (2007) described her as "perhaps the most media-savvy female performer ever". Although decades later, with the advent of social media, her then-well-received "media manipulator" image turned "inauthentic" for others.

=== Relationship with the media ===
The media have always drawn on Madonna for sensational news, yet they have also been quite relentless in their criticism of her.

— University of Macerata scholars (2022).

In Keeping the Promise: Essays on Leadership, Democracy, and Education (2007), scholars called Madonna a "complex character in media culture". For years, she had a reputation as a "tough interviewee". While she continued to attract media interest into the 21st century, she was known as an elusive figure. In Howard Stern Comes Again (2019), radio personality Howard Stern cites producer Gary Dell'Abate as saying that it took "about thirty years" to have an interview with the singer (in March 2015), accommodating their schedule to coincide with hers, and saying "that's the only time I've ever done that [...] That's how important it was to have Madonna on". Madonna: The Rolling Stone Files (1997), chronicles Madonna's relationship with Rolling Stone magazine, as described by them inside the book: "From the beginning, Rolling Stone was as fascinated by Madonna as were its readers". Madonna had become "one of the most famous tabloid fixtures in the world", possibly second to Princess Diana at times, wrote author Erin Carlson.

==== Incidents ====
Biographer Carol Gnojewski describes how Madonna's popularity also contributed to the undoing of her first marriage with Sean Penn. She describes how the media had already begun to consider her "public property". Penn and Madonna's relationship with the paparazzi was included in "Top 10 Celebrity/Paparazzi Showdowns" by Time magazine, with the staff saying: "Madonna was part of what might be the paparazzi-celebrity showdown that started it all". In December 2008, Madonna sued The Mail on Sunday for an alleged sum of £5 million in damages of breaching her privacy and copyright in publishing 11 pictures of her wedding with Guy Ritchie in 2000, followed news their marriage had broken down. According to The Guardian, if her claim was accepted it would be the biggest ever payout in a privacy case in the UK. In October 2009, People magazine wrote that Madonna had won the court case, and Associated Newspapers paid an undisclosed amount. The proceeds were to be donated to Madonna's charity, Raising Malawi.

In 1985, Penthouse and Playboy magazines published a number of nude photos of Madonna without her permission. They had their Madonna issues on newsstands weeks earlier than usual and increased their print run by 15 and 10 percent, respectively. Five million copies, each, of Penthouse's and Playboy's Madonna issues were distributed. Later, Madonna had also suffered censure due to her provocative tones. Her appearance in 1994 at the Late Show with David Letterman became the most censored episode in American network television talk-show history. Madonna was censured by Texarkana HITS 105 Radio, due a provocative speech at the 2017 Women's March against Donald Trump. Its general manager, Terry Thomas, explained in a statement that "banning all Madonna songs at HITS 105 is not a matter of politics, it's a matter of patriotism", after they perceived her as exhibiting un-American sentiments.

== Achievements ==
=== Sobriquets ===
Various authors discussed Madonna while using sobriquets related to her media-reaching success. She was named a "media icon" in Exploring Media Culture (1996). The authors of Sound-Bite Saboteurs (2010), referred to Madonna as an "icon of our media culture". In 1987, American critic Kristine McKenna called her the "Goddess of Mass Communications". Bego similarly explored how Madonna surpassed the moniker of "star" and ascended to the role of "Media Goddess". According to James Robert Parish and Michael R. Pitts in Hollywood Songsters: Garland to O'Connor (2003), Madonna became the latest "Queen of the Media". Madonna was also called the "Queen of MTV". CNN staff commented in 1998, MTV could stand for "Madonna Television".

Retrospectively, Peter Robinson, from The Guardian, highlighted her as the "Original Queen of Pop Media". In 2013, professor Mathew Donahue from Bowling Green State University referred to her as the "Queen of All Media".

=== Considerations ===
Immediately and retrospectively, various authors highly estimated her celebrity status. In The Greenwood Encyclopedia of Rock History (2006), MaryAnn Janosik denounced trying to limit Madonna's fame to a single decade by saying, "calling Madonna the biggest female star of the mid-late 1980s would be as limiting a profile as identifying Michael Jackson as African American or Bruce Springsteen as a New Jersey Catholic". In the 2000s, Madonna was called "arguably the biggest female pop star in American history" by Christopher John Farley and "America's greatest female pop star ever" by Utrecht University professor Anne-Marie Korte. By 2003, Merle Ginsberg described her as "perhaps the biggest star who ever lived". Similarly, Louis Virtel for Uproxx in 2014 called her as the "greatest celebrity of all time". In 2023, Billboard referred to her as "the biggest pop diva the world has ever seen". In Profiles of Female Genius (1994), the author wrote that only her inability to conquer movies has kept her from being acknowledged as the greatest female entertainment phenomenon ever.

=== Selected media records ===
Madonna established several MTV records. According to El Telégrafo, "La Isla Bonita" became the most requested video in the channel's history for a record-breaking 20 consecutive weeks. According to John W. Whitehead, Madonna was the artist with the "most videos released" through the channel. Similarly, editors of Encyclopedia of Contemporary American Culture (2005) said that "MTV plays her music videos more than any other artist's". She also had most videos released on Disk MTV by MTV Brasil.

She set the record of the largest live webcast after attracting more than 11 million users during a concert at London's Brixton Academy in 2000, surpassing Paul McCartney's 3 million users. According to some media reports, her kiss with Britney Spears at the 2003 MTV Video Music Awards became then the most searched image in the history of Internet. After her performance at the Super Bowl XLVI halftime show in 2012, Madonna set the record as the most-tweeted subject on Twitter. With the release of MDNA (2012) she set the largest day of pre-orders for an album on iTunes. In 2019, Madonna became the first female artist to have videos from four different decades with over 100 million views on YouTube.

=== Celebrity lists ===
Madonna has appeared in various power rankings and media coverage lists. For instance, she was included among the 101 Most Powerful People in Entertainment by Entertainment Weekly in 1990 and 1991, and was voted the Best Entertainer of the Year and Most Overexposed Actor/Actress in a 1992 US poll. From 1998 until 2016, Madonna made appearances in various Forbes Celebrity 100, which ranks several metrics such as earnings, media coverage, social media following and magazine covers.

In 2003, Alvin Hall ranked Madonna for BBC as the "most powerful celebrity". Madonna also was the most played artist of the 2000s in the United Kingdom according to Phonographic Performance Limited (PPL), and the most-talked about celebrity according to Kantar Group. In 2021, PPL ranked her second on a list of the most played women recording artists of the 21st century in UK. In 2022, Liberty Games ranked her as "the most popular musician" in history based on an analysis of over 6,500 songs from Billboard's Top-100 charts.

=== Internet rankings ===
"Madonna (—1958) is the highest ranking female music artist, in any genre"

— Madonna on Who's Bigger?: Where Historical Figures Really Rank (2013), "1,000 people in history"

Madonna also appeared in various lists of Internet culture. According to the Orlando Sentinel, Cornell University ranked Madonna in 2014 as the "most influential woman in history" based on a study of Wikipedia algorithms. In 2017, Madonna topped ThoughtCo's list of "Top 100 Women in History", calling Madonna "the number one woman of history searched for year after year on the Net". In 2014, Madonna was ranked third by Time magazine editor Chris Wilson at "The 100 Most Obsessed-Over People on the Web", only behind George W. Bush and Barack Obama. Similarly, Madonna was ranked third at COED's 2010 list of the "50 Most Popular Women on the Web" based on Google Search results.

=== Pop culture listicles ===
Pop culture listicles/publications (all-time/century) (Note: Listicles limited to only ten publications.)
Year/era	Publication(s)	List or Work	Rank	Ref.
1998	Time Life	Time 100: Leaders & Revolutionaries (Note: Section of "artists & entertainers")	n/a	
1999	Entertainment Weekly	100 Greatest Entertainers (Note: From the "past half-century")	5	
2003	People	200 Greatest Pop Culture Icons	9	
2003	VH1	200 Greatest Pop Culture Icons	7	
2004	VH1	100 Greatest Pop Culture Icons	2	
2005	Variety	100 Icons of the Century	n/a	
2008	Record Collector	100 Most Collectable Divas	1	
2013	ABC-CLIO	100 Entertainers Who Changed America	n/a	
2016	Encyclopædia Britannica, Inc.	The 100 Most Influential Entertainers of Stage and Screen	n/a	

== Book sources ==
- Baughman, James L. (2006). The Republic of Mass Culture. Johns Hopkins University Press. ISBN 0801883164.
- Bayles, Martha (1996). Hole in Our Soul: The Loss of Beauty and Meaning in American Popular Music. University of Chicago Press. ISBN 0226039595.
- Bego, Mark (2000). Madonna: Blonde Ambition. Cooper Square Press. ISBN 0815410514.
- Bennett, Andy; Waksman, Steve (2014). The SAGE Handbook of Popular Music. SAGE Publications. ISBN 978-1473910997.
- Bird, Linda; Cameron, Eve (2007). The Best Value Beauty Book Ever!. Infinite Ideas. ISBN 978-1904902850.
- Blackwell, Roger; Stephan, Tina (2004). Brands That Rock. Wiley. ISBN 978-0-471-48344-1.
- Buikema, Rosemarie; Liedeke, Plate; van der Tuin, Iris; Thiele, Kathrin (2009). Doing Gender in Media, Art and Culture. Taylor & Francis. ISBN 978-1-134-00641-0.
- Carlson, Dennis; Gause, C. P. (2007). Keeping the Promise: Essays on Leadership, Democracy, and Education. Peter Lang. ISBN 978-0820481999.
- Carlson, Erin (2023). No Crying in Baseball. Hachette Books. ISBN 978-0306830204.
- Cashmore, Ellis (2006). Celebrity Culture. Routledge. ISBN 1134191421.
- Cashmore, Ellis (2010). Making Sense of Sports. Routledge. ISBN 978-1-4441-4126-9.
- Cashmore, Ellis (2016). Studying Football. Taylor & Francis. ISBN 978-1317568971.
- Ciccone, Christopher (2008). Life with My Sister Madonna. Simon & Schuster. ISBN 978-1416587620.
- Cross, Mary (2007). Madonna: A Biography. Greenwood Publishing Group. ISBN 978-0-313-33811-3.
- Cvetkovich, Ann (2018). Articulating The Global And The Local: Globalization And Cultural Studies. Taylor & Francis. ISBN 978-0429981814.
- Delaney, Tim (2015). Connecting Sociology to Our Lives: An Introduction to Sociology. Routledge. ISBN 978-1317262145.
- Desser, David; Jowett, Garth (2000). Hollywood Goes Shopping. U of Minnesota Press. ISBN 0816635129.
- Dicker, Chris (2017). Madonna Biography: The Sex Symbol of The Music Industry Revealed. Smashwords Edition. ISBN 978-1-370-52975-9.
- Dienst, Richard (1994). Still Life in Real Time: Theory After Television. Duke University Press. ISBN 0822314665.
- DK (2002). Ultimate Biography: Inside the Lives of the World's 250 Most Influential People. DK. ISBN 0789484269.
- Dorenkamp, Angela G. (1995). Images of women in American popular culture. Harcourt. ISBN 978-0155010130.
- Doty, William G. (2000). Mythography: The Study of Myths and Rituals. University of Alabama Press. ISBN 0817310061.
- Drew, Julie; Lyons, Williams; Svehla, Lance (2010). Sound-Bite Saboteurs: Public Discourse, Education, and the State of Democratic Deliberation. State University of New York Press. ISBN 978-1438430423.
- Encyclopaedia Britannica (2016). Forte, Virginia (ed.). The 100 Most Influential Entertainers of Stage and Screen. Encyclopaedia Britannica Inc. ISBN 978-1-5081-0043-0.
- Faith, Karlene; Wasserlein, Frances (1997). Madonna, Bawdy & Soul. University of Toronto Press. ISBN 0-802-04208-2.
- Falconi, Francesco (2011). Mad for Madonna: la regina del pop (in Italian). Castelvecchi. ISBN 978-8876155505.
- Ferraro, Thomas J. (2020). Transgression and Redemption in American Fiction. Oxford University Press. ISBN 978-0192608109.
- Fouz-Hernández, Santiago; Jarman-Ivens, Freya (2004). Madonna's Drowned Worlds: New Approaches to her Cultural Transformations, 1983-2003. Routledge. ISBN 1351559540.
- Frank, Lisa; Smith, Paul (1993). Madonnarama: Essays on Sex and Popular Culture. Cleis Press. ISBN 0939416727.
- Frith, Simon; Goodwin, Andrew; Grossberg, Lawrence (1993). Sound and Vision: The Music Video Reader. Psychology Press. ISBN 9780415094313.
- Friskics-Warren, Bill (2006). I'll Take You There. A&C Black. ISBN 0-8264-1921-6.
- Gabriel, Mary (2023). Madonna: A Rebel Life. Little, Brown. ISBN 978-0316456449.
- Gregg, Robert; McDonogh, Gary W.; Wong, Cindy H. (2005). Bennett, Courtney (ed.). Encyclopedia of Contemporary American Culture. Routledge. ISBN 1134719299.
- Gnojewski, Carol (2007). Madonna: Express Yourself. Enslow Publishers. ISBN 978-0766024427.
- González, Ana Marta [in Spanish] (2009). Ficción e identidad. Ensayos de cultura postmoderna. Ediciones Rialp. ISBN 978-84-321-3728-0.
- Guilbert, Georges-Claude (2015). Madonna as Postmodern Myth. McFarland. ISBN 978-0-786-48071-5.
- Guinness, M. Young (2002). Guinness World Records 2002. Guinness World Records, Ltd. ISBN 0553583786.
- Hall, Dennis; Hall, Susan G (2010). American Icons. Greenwood Publishing Group. ISBN 978-0-275-98431-1.
- Harari, Oren (2006). Break From the Pack: How to Compete in a Copycat Economy. Pearson Education. ISBN 0132703823.
- Harrison, Thomas R. (2017). Pop Goes the Decade: The Eighties. ABC-CLIO. ISBN 978-1440836671.
- Havranek, Carrie (2009). Women Icons of Popular Music. Greenwood Press. ISBN 978-0-313-34085-7.
- Heller, Steven; Fink, Anne (1993). Covers & Jackets!: What the Best Dressed Books & Magazines are Wearing. Library of Applied Design. ISBN 0866361952.
- Hyden, Steven (2017). Your Favorite Band Is Killing Me. Little, Brown Book Group. ISBN 978-0316259149.
- Inglis, Ian (2013). Performance and Popular Music: History, Place and Time. Ashgate Publishing. ISBN 978-1409493549.
- Izod, John (2001). Myth, Mind and the Screen: Understanding the Heroes of Our Time. Cambridge University Press. ISBN 0521796865.
- Janosik, MaryAnn (2006). The Greenwood Encyclopedia of Rock History. Greenwood Press. ISBN 0313329435.
- Jermyn, Deborah (2016). Female Celebrity and Ageing: Back in the Spotlight. Taylor & Francis. ISBN 978-1134924868.
- Kaplan, Arie (2012). American Pop: Hit Makers, Superstars, and Dance Revolutionaries. Twenty-First Century Books. ISBN 978-1-4677-0148-8.
- Kellner, Douglas (2003). Media Spectacle. Psychology Press. ISBN 041526829X.
- Knauer, Kelly (1998). Time 100: leaders & revolutionaries: artists & entertainers. Time-Life Books. ISBN 9781883013493.
- Koch, Richard (2020). Unreasonable Success and How to Achieve It: Unlocking the Nine Secrets of People Who Changed the World. Little, Brown Book Group. ISBN 978-0-349-42291-6.
- La Lumiere, Jed (2012). Patience: A Gay Man's Virtue. FriesenPress. ISBN 978-1770978270.
- Landrum, Gene N. (1994). Profiles of Female Genius: Thirteen Creative Women who Changed the World. Prometheus Books. ISBN 0-87975-892-9.
- Marcovitz, Hal (2012). The History of Music Videos. Greenhaven Publishing. ISBN 978-1420509762.
- McFarlan, Donald (1990). 1990 Guinness Book of World Records. Sterling Publishing. ISBN 0806957905.
- McGrath, Tom (1996). MTV: The Making of a Revolution. Running Press. ISBN 1561387037.
- McWhirter, Norris; McFarlan, Donald (1989). The Guinness Book of Records: 1989. Guinness Pub. ISBN 0851128785.
- Miklitsch, Robert (1998). From Hegel to Madonna: Towards a General Economy of "Commodity Fetishism". Duke University Press. ISBN 978-0-822-36460-3.
- Morton, Andrew (2001). Madonna. St. Martin's Press. ISBN 978-1-854-79888-6.
- Morton, Andrew (2002). Madonna. Macmillan Publishers. ISBN 0-312-98310-7.
- Moy, Dr. Ron (2013). Kate Bush and Hounds of Love. Ashgate Publishing. ISBN 978-1409493709.
- Palmer, Landon (2020). Rock Star/Movie Star: Power and Performance in Cinematic Rock Stardom. Oxford University Press. ISBN 978-0190888404.
- Negrón-Muntaner, Frances (2004). Boricua Pop: Puerto Ricans and the Latinization of American Culture. New York University Press. ISBN 978-0-8147-5818-2.
- Nicholls, David (1998). The Rock and Roll Era. Cambridge University Press. ISBN 978-1-139-05538-3.
- Parish, James Robert (1995). Today's Black Hollywood. Pinnacle Books. ISBN 0786001046.
- Parish, James Robert; Pitts, Michael R. (2003). Hollywood Songsters: Garland to O'Connor. Routledge. ISBN 0415943337.
- Rayner, Philip; Wall, Peter; Kruger, Stephen (2004). Media Studies: The Essential Resource. Routledge. ISBN 0415291720.
- Real, Michael R. (1996). Exploring Media Culture: A Guide. SAGE Publications. ISBN 0803958765.
- Rolling Stone Press (1997). Madonna: the Rolling Stone Files. Hyperion. ISBN 0786881542.
- Rushkoff, Douglas (2010). Media Virus!: Hidden Agendas in Popular Culture. Random House. ISBN 978-0307775573.
- Schwichtenberg, Cathy (1993). The Madonna Connection. Westview Press. ISBN 0813313961.
- Sexton, Adam (1993). Desperately Seeking Madonna: in search of the meaning of the world's most famous woman. ABC-CLIO. ISBN 0385306881.
- Sickels, Robert C. (2013). 100 Entertainers Who Changed America: An Encyclopedia of Pop Culture Luminaries. ABC-CLIO. ISBN 978-1598848311.
- Simone, Alina (2016). Madonnaland. University of Texas Press. ISBN 978-1477308912.
- Shuker, Roy (2013). Understanding Popular Music. Routledge. ISBN 978-1134564798.
- Skiena, Steven; Ward, Charles B. (2014). Who's Bigger?: Where Historical Figures Really Rank. Cambridge University Press. ISBN 978-1107041370.
- Spigel, Lynn; Brunsdon, Charlotte (2007). Feminist Television Criticism. McGraw Hill Education. ISBN 978-0335225453.
- Stalder, Erika (2019). The Look Book. Zest Books. ISBN 978-1541582101.
- Stern, Howard (2019). Howard Stern Comes Again. Simon and Schuster. ISBN 978-1-5011-9431-3.
- Stewart, Abigail J.; Franz, Carol E. (1994). Women Creating Lives: Identities, Resilience, And Resistance. Avalon Publishing. ISBN 0813318734.
- Taraborrelli, J. Randy (2001). Madonna: An Intimate Biography. Simon & Schuster. ISBN 0-743-22880-4.
- Timmerman, Dirk (2007). Madonna Live! Secret Re-inventions and Confessions on Tour. Maklu. ISBN 978-9085950028.
- Thompson, Douglas (2002). Madonna: Queen of The World. Black Publishing. ISBN 1904034101.
- Troy, Gil (2005). Morning in America: how Ronald Reagan invented the 1980s. Princeton University Press. ISBN 0-691-12166-4.
- Walker, John A. (2003). Art and Celebrity. Pluto Press. ISBN 0745318509.
- Widdicombe, Ben (2021). Gatecrasher: How I Helped the Rich Become Famous and Ruin the World. Simon and Schuster. ISBN 978-1982128845.
- Weisbard, Eric (2021). Songbooks: The Literature of American Popular Music. Duke University Press. ISBN 978-1478021391.
- Whelehan, Imelda; Gwynne, Joel (2014). Ageing, Popular Culture and Contemporary Feminism. Palgrave Macmillan. ISBN 978-1-137-37653-4.
- Whitehead, John W. (2001). Grasping for the Wind: The Search for Meaning in the 20th Century. Zondervan. ISBN 0310232740.
