= Top 100 historical figures =

Top 100 historical figures may refer to:

- The 100: A Ranking of the Most Influential Persons in History, a 1978 book
- 100 Greatest Britons, a BBC series about historical figures from the United Kingdom
- Great South Africans, a South African TV series to determine the "100 Greatest South Africans"
- Time 100, an annual list of the 100 most influential people in the American world

== See also ==
- Top 100 (disambiguation)
- Category:Greatest Nationals, with various national imitations of the 100 Greatest Britons, some of which were top 100 lists
