= The Muslim 100 =

2008 book by Muhammad Mojlum Khan

The Muslim 100: The Lives, Thoughts and Achievements of the Most Influential Muslims in History
- Author: Muhammad Mojlum Khan
- Cover artist: Nasir Cadir
- Language: English
- Subject: Biographical dictionary
- Genre: Non-fiction
- Publisher: Kube Publishing Ltd
- Publication date: 1 March 2008
- Publication place: United Kingdom
- Media type: Print
- Pages: 459
- ISBN: 1847740065
- OCLC: 238604128

The Muslim 100: The Lives, Thoughts and Achievements of the Most Influential Muslims in History is a 2008 book, written by Muhammad Mojlum Khan and published by Kube Publishing, listing the biographies of the 100 most influential Muslims in history.

== Overview ==
The Muslim 100 is an attempt to explore Islamic history through the lives, thoughts and achievements of a selection of the most influential Muslims.

By exploring the ideas, thoughts and achievements of the lives of 100 most influential Muslim rulers and conquerors, religious scholars and philosophers, writers and literary figures, scientists and explorers, military generals and freedom fighters, reformers and educationalists, this book goes through Islamic thought, history, culture and civilization.

== Content ==
The 100 most influential Muslims include 20 personalities from modern times. The 100 names include Abū Ḥanīfa, Al-Ghazali, Ibn Arabi, Muhammad Ali Jinnah, Mustafa Kemal Atatürk, Sir Muhammad Iqbal, Abul A'la Maududi, and Malcolm X. Among the 100, the author listed only four females, ‘A’ishah bint Abu Bakr, Khadīja bint Khuwaylid, Fatimah and Rābiʻah al-ʻAdawiyya al-Qaysiyya.

== See also ==
- The 100: A Ranking of the Most Influential Persons in History
- The 500 Most Influential Muslims
- Top 100 (disambiguation)
- Who's Who
