= Sack of Magadha =

Part of Ghurid campaigns in India

Ghurid raids of Magadha
- Part of Ghurid campaigns in India
Date	1199—1200 or 1202–1203 (disputed)
Location	Bihar
Result	Ghurid victory
Territorial changes	Parts of Bihar annexed by the Ghurid Empire

Belligerents
Ghurid Dynasty	Local chieftains

Commanders and leaders
Bakhtiyar Khalji	Unknown

Strength
200	Unknown

Casualties and losses
Unknown	Heavy

The Khalji Raids into Magadha, were military campaigns of the Ghurid Empire led by the Ghurid commander Bakhtiyar Khalji in the early 13th century. Bakhtiyar successfully captured Bihar, incorporating it into the Ghurid Empire, before proceeding with his invasion of Bengal.

== The conquest ==
Muhammad Bakhtiyar Khalji advanced towards Bihar with a mere 200 soldiers, yet he accomplished the relatively easy capture of one of its most heavily fortified forts, Udantapuri. While local inhabitants did resist the Ghurid general and his forces, resulting in significant casualties on both sides. Despite emerging from his fort to engage in battle with great courage, the ruler was ultimately defeated and killed in the ensuing confrontation with the Khalji commander.

=== Destruction of Nalanda and Vikramshila ===
It is highly likely that during this particular conquest, as recorded by the Tibetan chronicler Taranath in the 15th century, Bakhtiyar also seized the monastic cities of Vikramsila and Nalanda, and proceeded to raze them to the ground. He mercilessly slaughtered all the residents and plundered a great amount of riches, which he then delivered to Sultan of Delhi, Qutubuddin Aibak.

Muhammad Bakhtiyar Khalji demolished ancient centers of learning at Nalanda and Vikramshila before orchestrating a widespread massacre upon entering the fort, historical evidence suggests otherwise. The prevailing consensus among historians refutes the portrayal of Bakhtiyar Khalji as a merciless and bloodthirsty military leader. Instead, a more nuanced understanding reveals that Bakhtiyar Khalji's actions were not marked by cruelty or ruthlessness, challenging the traditional narrative that has painted him in an unfavorable light.

The three kings of the Guptas of Jayapura dynasty who likely lived in the first half of the 12th century. They were vassals of the Palas, as Monghyr was part of the Pala kingdom until the mid-12th century. After the decline of the Palas, Rajadityagupta declared independence. His son, Krishnagupta, passed away before him. Rajadityagupta was succeeded by his grandson, Sangramagupta. It is believed that Sarhgramagupta, another ruler of the Guptas, was a contemporary of Lakshmana Sena. The Guptas' power was likely ended by Muhammad Bakhtyär Khalji in the early 13th century during the reign of Sangramagupta.

== Aftermath ==
After consolidating control over Bihar and nearby areas by establishing military garrisons (thanas), he prepared to invade Bengal, then ruled by Lakshmana Sena of the Sena dynasty. Bakhtiyar Khalji advanced rapidly and reached the gates of the Sena ruler’s palace in Nadia with almost no resistance. According to Minhaj al-Siraj, he rode so fast that only 18 horsemen could keep up with him. The Sena king fled through a back door of the palace, escaping with his family and close aides toward a refuge near modern Dhaka. Bakhtiyar Khalji did not chase him. His swift capture of Nadia prior to 1204 marked the end of the Sena dynasty.

== Bibliography ==
- Sarkar, Jadunath (1943). The History of Bengal. Vol. II. University of Dacca.
- Ramakrishnan, S. (2001). History and Culture of the Indian People, Volume 05, The Struggle For Empire. Public Resource. Bharatiya Vidya Bhavan.
- Srivastava, A. L. (1971). History of India 1000 A D to 1707 A D (3rd ed.). Agra: Shiva Lal Agarwala & Company.
- Khan, Muhammad Mojlum (2013). The Muslim Heritage of Bengal: The Lives, Thoughts and Achievements of Great Muslim Scholars, Writers and Reformers of Bangladesh and West Bengal. Kube Publishing Limited. ISBN 978-1-84774-052-6.
