= Muhammad Bakhtiyar Khalji =

13th-century Turko-Afghan military general of the Ghurid dynasty

Ikhtiyar al-Din Muhammad Bin Bakhtiyar Khalji
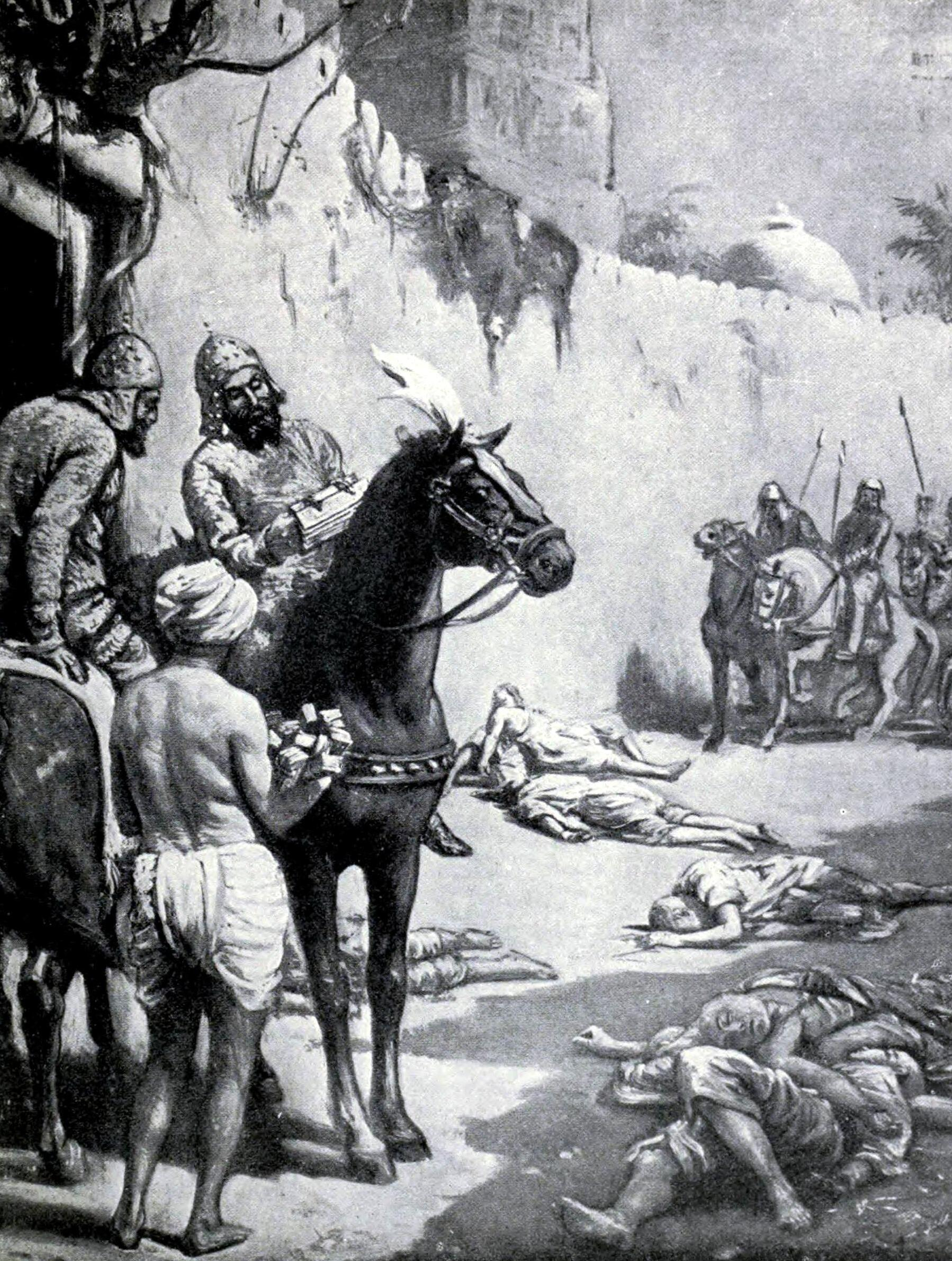
- Muhammad bin Bakhtiyar Khalji and his fellow warrior Subahdar Auliya Khan leading troops in the slaughter of Buddhist monks at a monastery in Bihar. Early 20th-century illustration.

1st Governor of Khalji dynasty (Bengal)
- Reign: c. 1203 – August 1206
- Predecessor: Position established
- Successor: Muhammad Shiran Khalji
- Sultan: Muhammad of Ghor
- Born: Ikhtiyaruddin c. 1150; Garmsir, Helmand, Ghaznavid Empire (modern-day Afghanistan)
- Died: August 1206 (aged 55–56); Devkot, South Dinajpur, Ghurid Empire (present-day West Bengal, India)
- Burial: 1206; Pirpal Dargah, Narayanpur, Gangarampur, West Bengal
Names
- Ikhtiyar al-Din Muhammad Bin Bakhtiyar Khalji
- Clan: Khilji
- Father: Bakhtiyar Khilji
- Religion: Sunni Islam
- Occupation: Military General; Governor

Ikhtiyār al-Dīn Muḥammad Bin Bakhtiyār Khaljī (Persian: اختیارالدین محمد بن بختیار خلجی), also known as Bakhtiyar Khalji (Bengali: বখতিয়ার খলজি, romanized: Bokhtiyar Kholjī), was a Turko-Afghan military general of the Ghurid ruler Muhammad of Ghor, who led the Muslim conquests of the eastern Indian regions of Bengal and parts of Bihar and established himself as their deputy-ruler/governor. He was the founder of the Khalji dynasty of Bengal, which ruled Bengal for a short period, from 1203 to 1227. His rule begun the Muslim rule in Bengal.

Khalji's invasions of the Indian subcontinent between 1197 and 1206 led to mass flight and massacres of monks, and caused damage to the traditional Buddhist institutions of higher learning in Northern India. In Bengal, Khalji's reign was responsible for the displacement of Buddhism. The leading centre of teaching for Mahayana Buddhism was Nalanda. At the end of the 12th century, Bakhityar Khalji demolished the monastery in a brutal sacking. Bakhtiyar launched an ill-fated Tibet campaign in 1206 and was assassinated upon returning to Bengal. He was succeeded by Muhammad Shiran Khalji.

== Early life and origin ==
Bakhtiyar Khalji was born and raised in Garmsir, Helmand, in present-day southern Afghanistan. He was member of the Khalaj tribe, which was originally of Turkic origin. After being settled in south-eastern Afghanistan for over 200 years, it led to the creation of the Pashtun Ghilji tribe, with Bakhtiyar seen as a Turko-Afghan. Later in the Khalji Revolution, the Khaljis faced discrimination and were looked down upon by other Turks for Afghan barbarians.

Bakhtiyar during his early years went in search of employment to Ghazni and Delhi. At the latter, he was rejected due to his ugly appearance. Afterwards, he moved towards Badaun in present-day Uttar Pradesh, where he obtained his first employment. Accounts differ regarding who initially took Bakhtiyar into his service.

Bakhtiyar did not come from an obscure background. His uncle Muhammad bin Mahmud had fought in the Second Battle of Tarain against Prithviraja III. Mahmud was later honoured with the iqta of Kashamandi. After the death of his uncle, the iqta was passed to Bakhtiyar. However, Bakhtiyar did not stay in Kashamndi for long. He approached the commander of Benaras, Husamudin Aghul Bek, who was impressed with his gallantry and bestowed on him the iqtas of Bhagwat and Bhilui (present-day Mirzapur district).

In his early career, before the expeditions in Bengal and Bihar, Bakhtiyar displaced the minor Gahadavala chiefs in the region of present-day Uttar Pradesh and from there raided Maner and Bihar where he looted a large amount of booty. These successful raids increased Bakhtiyar's fame and many Khaljis joined in his service. Qutb ud-Din Aibak also honoured him.

== Military career ==
Khalji was head of the Ghurid military force that conquered parts of eastern India at the end of the 12th century and at the beginning of the 13th century.

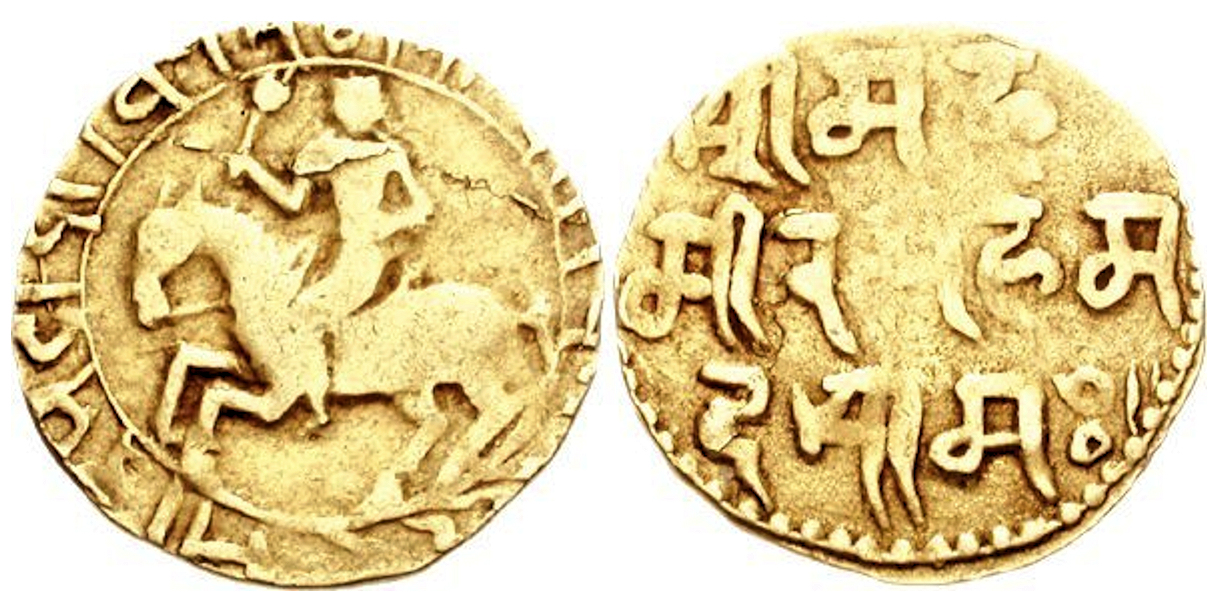
Bengal coinage of Bakhtiyar Khalji (1204–1206 CE). Struck in the name of Mu'izz al-Din Muhammad, dated Samvat 1262 (1204 CE). Obverse: Horseman with Nagari legend around: samvat 1262 bhadrapada "August, year 1262". Reverse: Nagari legend: srima ha/ mira mahama /da saamah "Lord Emir Mohammed [ibn] Sam".

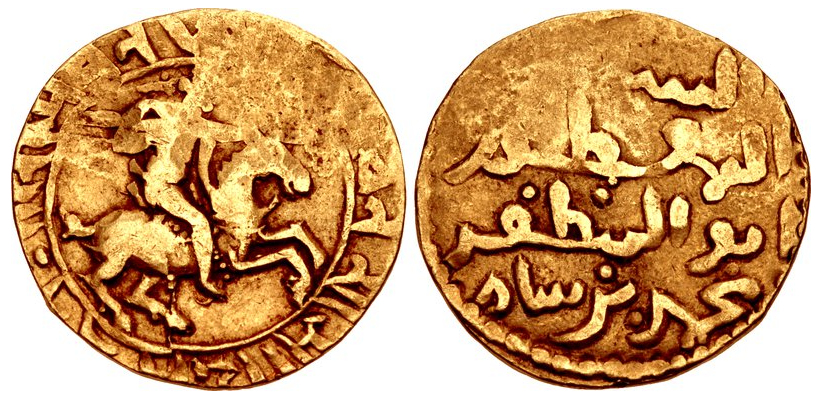
Another type of Bengal coinage of Muhammad Bakhtiyar Khalji as governor (1204–1206 CE). Obverse: horseman galloping, holding lance with Devanagari legend around (śrimat mahamada samah "Lord Mohammed [ibn] Sam"). Reverse: name and titles of Mu'izz al-Din Muhammad bin Sam in Arabic. Struck AD 1204–1205. This is his earliest coinage in Bengal, using both Sanskrit and Arabic legends.

=== Campaigns of Bihar ===
He subjugated much of Bihar in 1200. His invasions destroyed the university establishments at Odantapuri and Vikramashila Mahaviras. Minhaj-i-Siraj Juzjani's Tabaqat-i Nasiri documents Bakhtiyar Khalji's sack of a Buddhist monastery, which the author equates in his description with a city he calls "Bihar", from the soldiers' use of the word vihara. According to the early 17th-century Buddhist scholar Taranatha, the invaders massacred many monks at Odantapuri, and destroyed Vikramashila. Historians Satish Chandra, Mohammad Habib and others have directly or indirectly implicated Bakhtiyar in the destruction of the Mahaviharas in their writings, but others like D.N. Jha and Namit Arora have reasoned that Nalanda may not have been destroyed by him.

=== Conquest of Bengal ===
Following Bihar campaigns, Khalji conquered Bengal. With the octogenarian emperor Lakshmana Sena at the helm, the Sena dynasty was in a state of decline and could not provide much resistance. As Khalji came upon the city of Nabadwip, it is said that he advanced so rapidly that only 18 horsemen from his army could keep up. The small horde entered the city unchallenged and took the emperor and his army by shock. This caused Lakhsmana Sena to flee with his retainers to east Bengal. Khalji subsequently went on to capture Gauda (ancient Lakhnauti), the capital and the principal city of Bengal and intruded into much of Bengal.

Muhammad Bakhtiyar's rule was related by Minhaj al-Siraj, as he visited Bengal about 40 years later:

After Muhammad Bakhtiyar possessed himself of that territory he left the city of Nudiah in desolation, and the place which is (now) Lakhnauti he made the seat of government. He brought the different parts of the territory under his sway, and instituted therein, in every part, the reading of the khutbah, and the coining of money; and, through his praiseworthy endeavours, and those of his Amirs, masjids [mosques], colleges, and monasteries (for Dervishes), were founded in those parts.

— Account of the conquest of Bengal, Minhaj al-Siraj.

=== Invasion of Tibet (1206) ===
Bakhtiyar Khalji left the town of Devkot in 1206 to attack Tibet, leaving Ali Mardan Khalji in Ghoraghat Upazila to guard the eastern frontier from his headquarters at Barisal. Bakhtiyar Khalji's forces suffered a disastrous defeat at the hands of Tibetan guerrilla forces at Chumbi Valley, which forced him to retreat to Devkot with only about a hundred surviving soldiers. This was first and shameful defeat of Khalji.

== Death and aftermath ==
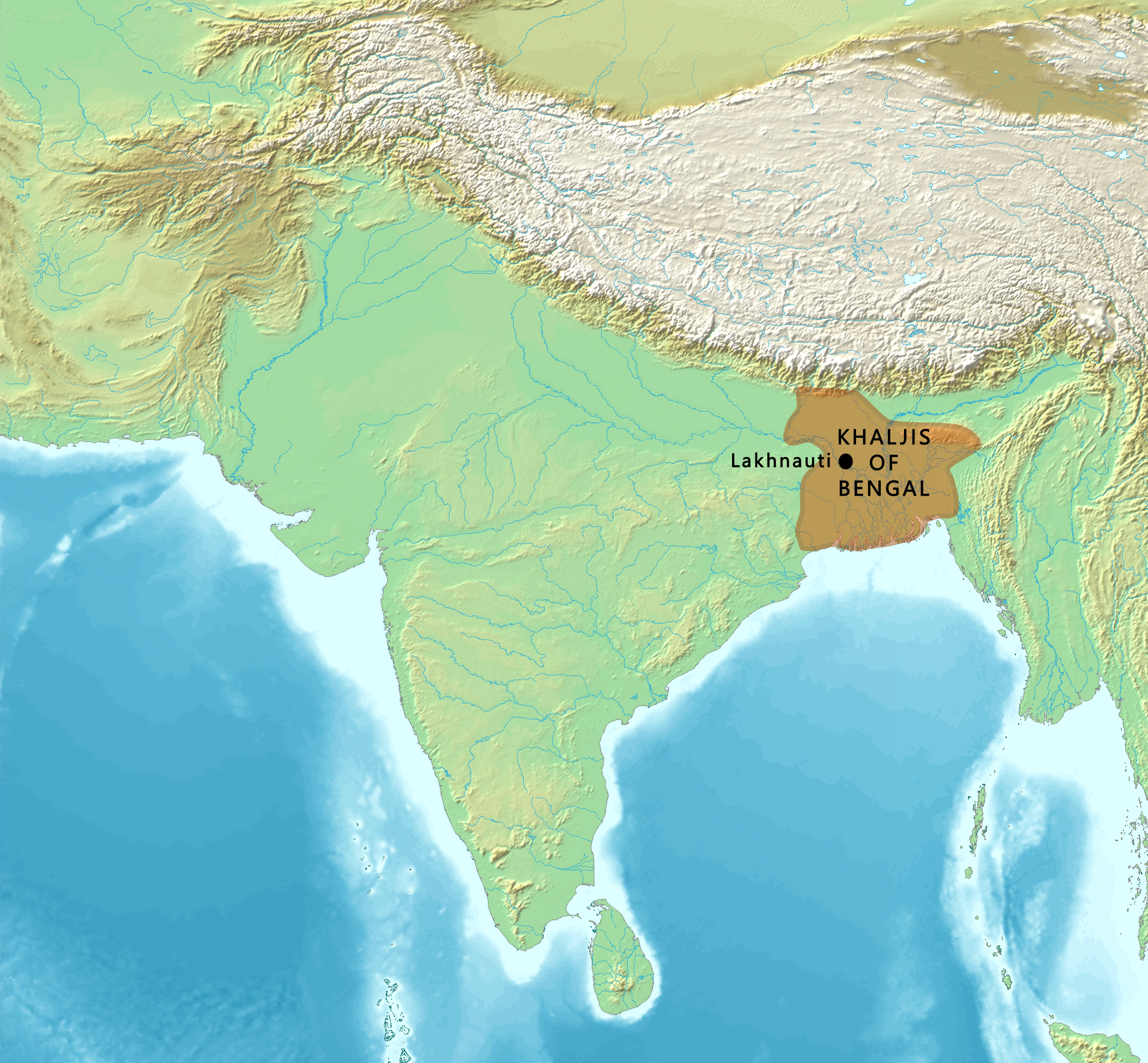
Khalji dynasty of Bengal

As Bakhtiyar Khalji lay ill and exhausted in Devkot after defeated by Tibetans, he was assassinated by Ali Mardan Khalji in August 1206.

The Khalji noblemen then appointed Muhammad Shiran Khalji as Bakhtiyar's successor. Loyal troops under Shiran Khalji and Subedar Aulia Khan avenged Ikhtiyar's death, imprisoning Ali Mardan Khalji. Eventually Ali Mardan fled to Delhi and provoked the Sultan of Delhi Qutb al-Din Aibak to conquer Bengal, who sent an army under Qayemaz Rumi, the governor of Awadh, to dethrone Shiran Khalji. Shiran fled to Dinajpur where he later died.

Ghiyas-ud-din Iwaz Khalji assisted the invasion and assumed the governorship of Bengal in 1208. But shortly after, he yielded power to Ali Mardan willingly, when the latter returned from Delhi in 1210. However, the nobles of Bengal conspired against and assassinated Ali Mardan in 1212. Iwaj Khalji assumed power again and proclaimed his independence from the Delhi sultanate.

== Legacy ==
Muhammad Bakhtiyar Khalji had the Khutbah read and coins struck in his name. Mosques, madrasas, and khanqahs arose through Bakhtiyar's patronage, and his example was imitated by his successors. According to Muhammad Yusuf Siddiq, Muhammad Bakhtiyar Khalji's swift conquest of Bengal succeeded largely because the Sena rulers had failed to win the support of the common people—both Hindus and Buddhists. The Senas, originally Brahman Kshatriyas from southern India, were culturally, linguistically (they did not speak Bengali), and religiously alienated from the local population. Their strict enforcement of the caste system further deepened social divisions. In contrast, Bakhtiyar Khalji quickly gained the goodwill of the indigenous people through an inclusive approach. He even funded the construction of a Buddhist monastery, which helped foster early mutual respect and understanding between the local population and Muslim migrants.

Muhammad Mojlum Khan writes that Bakhtiyar Khalji built an inclusive administrative system in Bengal and actively weakened the oppressive Brahmanical caste system, freeing the masses from long-standing social bondage and destitution. His benevolent and humane approach won over Hindus and Buddhists, leading to voluntary conversions and a growing Muslim population. He further assesses Khalji as a liberal and enlightened ruler who pioneered Islamic thought, culture, and civilization in Bengal and northern India.

Bakhtiyar is revered as Pir Sahib by the locals of Pirpal village. Every year on Thursday of the month of Baishakh, festival is organised at the Bakhtiyar Khilji Shrine in Gangarampur where prayer is offered by Muslims and Hindus alike.

== See also ==
- List of rulers of Bengal#Delhi Sultanate era
- Ghazi Saiyyad Salar Masud
- Bakhtiarpur
- Sack of Magadha

== Bibliography ==
- Nizami, K. A. (1970). "Foundation of the Delhi Sultanat". In Habib, Mohammad; Nizami, Khaliq Ahmad (eds.). A Comprehensive History of India: The Delhi Sultanat (A.D. 1206-1526). Vol. 5. People's Publishing House. OCLC 305725.
- Khan, Muhammad Mojlum (21 October 2013). The Muslim Heritage of Bengal: The Lives, Thoughts and Achievements of Great Muslim Scholars, Writers and Reformers of Bangladesh and West Bengal. Kube Publishing Ltd. ISBN 9781847740625.

Preceded by Sena dynasty King Lakshman Sen	Khalji dynasty of Bengal; 1204–1206	Succeeded by Muhammad Shiran Khalji
