= Michael H. Hart =

American astrophysicist and white separatist (born 1932)

- Born: April 27, 1932 (age 94); New York City, U.S.
- Education: Cornell University (AB); New York Law School (LLB); Adelphi University (MS); Princeton University (PhD)
- Known for: The 100: A Ranking of the Most Influential Persons in History; Fermi paradox; White separatism

Michael H. Hart (born April 27, 1932) is an American author, astrophysicist and white nationalist. Since 1978, he has published five books, most notably the best-selling work, The 100: A Ranking of the Most Influential Persons in History.

== Fermi paradox ==
Hart published in 1975 a detailed examination of the Fermi paradox: the contrast between the extreme likelihood of extraterrestrial life somewhere in the universe and the total absence of any evidence for this. Hart's work has prompted several papers as answers. Geoffrey A. Landis writes: "A more proper name for [the paradox] would be the Fermi-Hart paradox, since while Fermi is credited with first asking the question, Hart was the first to do a rigorous analysis showing that the problem is not trivial, and also the first to publish his results". Robert H. Gray views Hart as the proper originator of this argument, in Hart's 1975 paper. Gray argues that the term Fermi paradox is a misnomer; that it is not the work of Fermi, nor is it an actual paradox (rather an argument). He therefore proposes that, instead of the (standard, but in his view incorrect) name Fermi paradox, it should be known as the Hart-Tipler argument – acknowledging Hart's priority as the argument's originator, but also acknowledging Frank J. Tipler's substantial extension of Hart's arguments in his 1980 paper "Extraterrestrial intelligent beings do not exist".

Hart is an advocate of the Rare Earth hypothesis; he proposed a very narrow habitable zone based on climate studies. He advocated for this hypothesis in the book which he co-edited, "Extraterrestrials: Where are They", in particular in the chapter he contributed to it "Atmospheric Evolution, the Drake Equation and DNA: Sparse Life in an Infinite Universe".

== The 100: A Ranking of the Most Influential Persons in History ==
Hart's first book was The 100: A Ranking of the Most Influential Persons in History (1978), which has sold more than 500,000 copies and been translated into many languages. The first person on Hart's list was Muhammad, chosen over Jesus or Moses. Hart attributes this to the fact that Muhammad was "supremely successful" in both the religious and secular realms. He also accredits Muhammad for his role in the development of Islam, far more influential than Jesus' contribution to the development of Christianity. Hart claims that Paul the Apostle was more pivotal than Jesus to the growth of Christianity.

== White nationalism ==
Hart has described himself as a white separatist and is active in white separatist causes. In 1996, he addressed a conference organized by Jared Taylor's white separatist organization, New Century Foundation, publisher of American Renaissance. He proposed partitioning the United States into four states: a white state, a black state, a Hispanic state, and an integrated mixed-race state.

At the 2006 American Renaissance conference, Hart, who is Jewish, had a public confrontation with David Duke, the former Grand Wizard of the Ku Klux Klan and former Louisiana state representative, over Duke's antisemitic remarks. Hart then stood up, called Duke a Nazi and stormed out. Some participants jeered at Hart. After this incident, Hart left American Renaissance.

In 2009, Hart organized a racist conference in Baltimore with the title Preserving Western Civilization. It was billed as addressing the need to defend "America's Judeo-Christian heritage and European identity." Invited speakers included: Lawrence Auster, Peter Brimelow, Steven Farron, Julia Gorin, Lino A. Graglia, Henry C. Harpending, Roger D. McGrath, Pat Richardson, J. Philippe Rushton, Srdja Trifković, and Brenda Walker. In this conference, Hart compared the Qur'an to Mein Kampf and Islam to Nazism.

== Books ==
- The 100: A Ranking of the Most Influential Persons in History, 1978 (Revised Edition, 1992)
- Extra-Terrestrials, Where Are They? (co-edited with Ben Zuckerman), 1982 (Second Edition, 1995)
- A View from the Year 3000 (Poseidon Press, 1999)
- Understanding Human History (Washington Summit Publishers, 2007)
- Restoring America (VDare, 2015)
- Puzzles and Paradoxes (Austin Macauley Publishers, 2024)
