= Aylsham, Saskatchewan =

Village in Saskatchewan, Canada

Aylsham
- Village
- Village of Aylsham
- Location of Aylsham in Saskatchewan Aylsham (Canada)
- Coordinates: 53.1132°N 103.4819°W
- Country: Canada
- Province: Saskatchewan
- Region: East-central
- Census division: 14
- Rural municipality: Nipawin No. 487

Government
  - Type: Aylsham Village Council

Population (2006)
  - Total: 92
- Time zone: CST
- Postal code: S0E 0C0
- Area code: 306

Aylsham (2016 population: 65) is a village in the Canadian province of Saskatchewan within the Rural Municipality of Nipawin No. 487 and Census Division No. 14. The village is approximately 65 kilometres (40 mi) northeast of the city of Melfort.

== History ==
Aylsham incorporated as a village on 4 August 1947. The Aylsham post office was opened in 1921, named after Aylsham, Norfolk, England, which in turn was adopted for the community's name.

== Demographics ==
Population history (1981–2016)
Year	Pop.	±%
1981	132	—
1986	146	+10.6%
1991	104	−28.8%
1996	91	−12.5%
2001	106	+16.5%
2006	92	−13.2%
2011	71	−22.8%
2016	65	−8.5%
Source: Statistics Canada via Saskatchewan Bureau of Statistics

In the 2021 Census of Population conducted by Statistics Canada, Aylsham had a population of 82 living in 38 of its 44 total private dwellings, a change of 26.2% from its 2016 population of 65. With a land area of 0.53 km^{2} (0.20 sq mi), it had a population density of 154.7/km^{2} (400.7/sq mi) in 2021.

In the 2016 Census of Population, the Village of Aylsham recorded a population of 65 living in 40 of its 44 total private dwellings, a −9.2% change from its 2011 population of 71. With a land area of 0.48 km^{2} (0.19 sq mi), it had a population density of 135.4/km^{2} (350.7/sq mi) in 2016.

== Climate ==
Climate data for Aylsham
Month	Jan	Feb	Mar	Apr	May	Jun	Jul	Aug	Sep	Oct	Nov	Dec	Year
Record high °C (°F)	6 (43)	7.5 (45.5)	17 (63)	31.1 (88.0)	35 (95)	38.5 (101.3)	34.5 (94.1)	35.5 (95.9)	33.3 (91.9)	27 (81)	17.8 (64.0)	11 (52)	38.5 (101.3)
Mean daily maximum °C (°F)	−14.3 (6.3)	−9.5 (14.9)	−2.4 (27.7)	8.9 (48.0)	17.9 (64.2)	22 (72)	23.9 (75.0)	23.3 (73.9)	16.7 (62.1)	8.8 (47.8)	−3.5 (25.7)	−11.7 (10.9)	6.7 (44.1)
Daily mean °C (°F)	−19.2 (−2.6)	−14.6 (5.7)	−7.8 (18.0)	3.1 (37.6)	11.1 (52.0)	15.7 (60.3)	17.7 (63.9)	16.7 (62.1)	10.7 (51.3)	3.6 (38.5)	−7.4 (18.7)	−16.2 (2.8)	1.1 (34.0)
Mean daily minimum °C (°F)	−24.1 (−11.4)	−19.7 (−3.5)	−13.2 (8.2)	−2.7 (27.1)	4.2 (39.6)	9.4 (48.9)	11.4 (52.5)	10 (50)	4.6 (40.3)	−1.6 (29.1)	−11.2 (11.8)	−20.7 (−5.3)	−4.5 (23.9)
Record low °C (°F)	−44.4 (−47.9)	−44 (−47)	−37 (−35)	−29.4 (−20.9)	−9 (16)	−2 (28)	1.1 (34.0)	−2 (28)	−7.8 (18.0)	−22 (−8)	−37.5 (−35.5)	−42 (−44)	−44.4 (−47.9)
Average precipitation mm (inches)	17.6 (0.69)	14.1 (0.56)	19.4 (0.76)	23.9 (0.94)	46.2 (1.82)	79.2 (3.12)	80.4 (3.17)	60.4 (2.38)	46.1 (1.81)	33 (1.3)	23 (0.9)	22.4 (0.88)	465.6 (18.33)
Source: Environment Canada

== Notable people ==
- Greg Classen Former NHL hockey player
- Karlene Faith Canadian writer, feminist, scholar, and human rights activist

== See also ==
- List of communities in Saskatchewan
- List of villages in Saskatchewan
