= General Sentiment =

Former Analytics Company

General Sentiment, Inc. was a Long Island-based social media and news media analytics company.

The company had patented text analytics software to analyze content from more than 60 million sources including blogs, forums, Twitter, Facebook and comment sections. General Sentiment's technology analyzed social conversations, themes, news articles, key influencers, marketing campaigns and un-aided brand awareness. The company shut down on June 24, 2015 and laid off all of its employees.

== Technology ==
General Sentiment's core system included a natural language processing engine to analyze text and entity management to track entities. The frontend consisted of depository servers and the Social Intelligence Platform, which hosted a number of applications that are useful for brand measurement. General Sentiment offered a software as a service (SaaS)-based solution delivered via the Amazon Cloud.

In December 2010, an official Google blog implied that the search engine owned General Sentiment’s sentiment analysis. Unique to General Sentiment was a patented ad-value-equivalency metric called Media Value, which placed a dollar value on the media buzz about a specified topic. The technology performed auto-entity extraction to automatically identify and track entities. At one point, General Sentiment tracked more than one billion entities and had some historical data dating back to 2004.

== History ==
The company was cofounded in 2008 by Steven Skiena, a PhD in computer science, and Mark Fasciano, who also founded FatWire.

The underlying technology platform, a natural language processing (NLP) and sentiment analysis system called Lydia, was developed by Dr. Steven Skiena at Stony Brook University. It used Apache Hadoop to process large quantities of data.

General Sentiment’s software accurately predicted the winner of the American Idol Finale in 2011.

== Products ==
General Sentiment offered a variety of products.

=== Social Intelligence Platform ===
The Social Intelligence Platform provided customers with tools to solve a variety of problems. Customers used the platform for brand health monitoring, partnership identification, crisis alerts, impact analysis, industry tracking, media suitability analysis and political issue and candidate tracking. Applications available on the Social Intelligence Platform included Power App, Data App and MediaMatch.

=== Custom Reporting ===
General Sentiment custom reports provided quarterly, monthly or weekly targeted insights tailored to each customer's need.

=== Report Series ===
General Sentiment offered a number of report series in addition to its specialty reports. The STAR GS series was the result of a partnership with the company behind the Q Score. Each quarter, General Sentiment released a Global Brands report, which analyzed the brands that had the most significant impact online.

=== Data API ===
The General Sentiment Application Programming Interface (API) allowed access to the media measurement indicators that General Sentiment uses for analysis.
