= Greg Classen =

Canadian ice hockey player

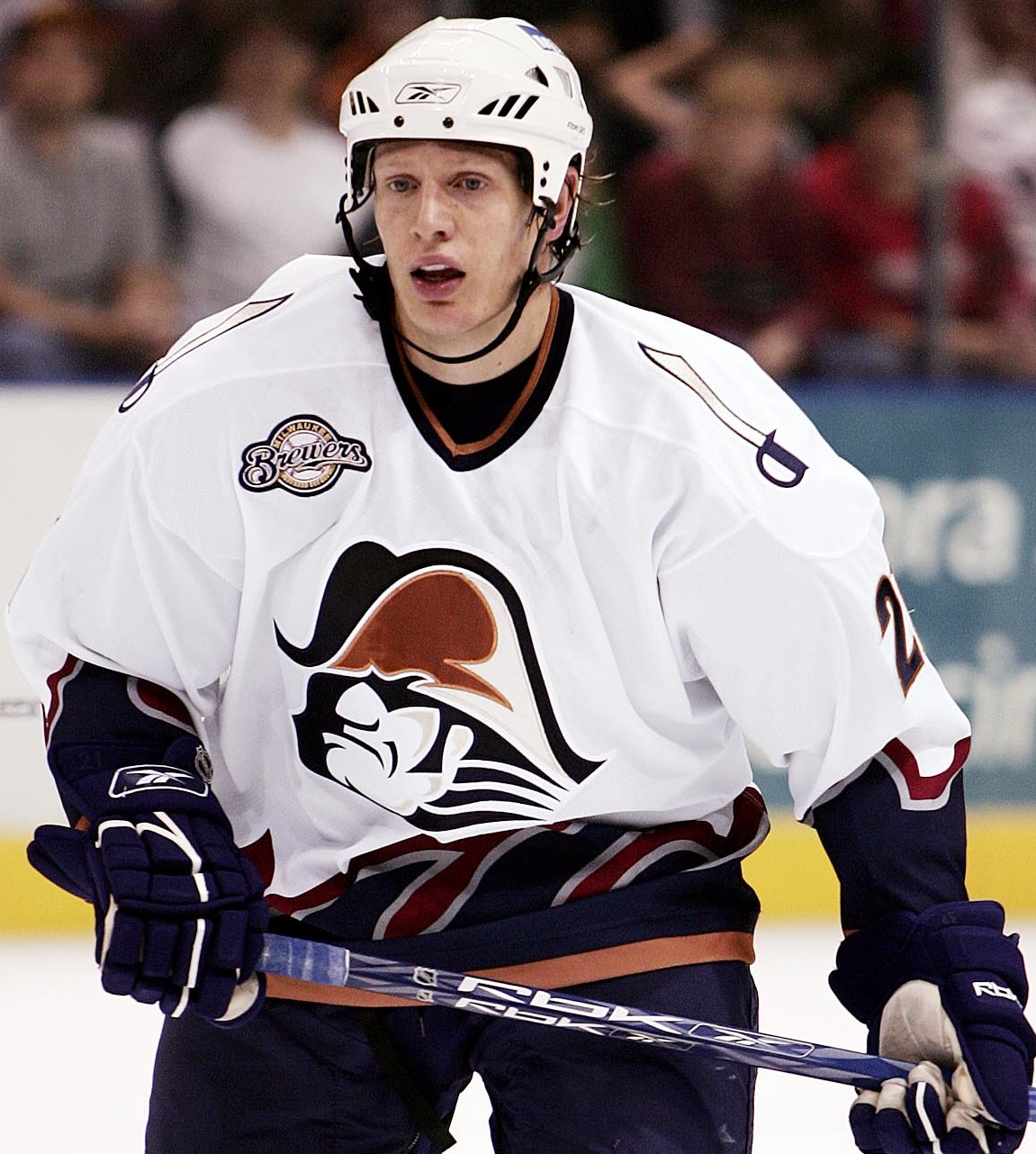
- Classen with the Milwaukee Admirals in 2005
- Born: August 24, 1977 (age 48) Aylsham, Saskatchewan, Canada
- Height: 6 ft 1 in (185 cm)
- Weight: 200 lb (91 kg; 14 st 4 lb)
- Position: Centre
- Shot: Left
- Played for: Nashville Predators; Porin Ässät; Hamburg Freezers; Iserlohn Roosters; EHC Basel Sharks; Rapperswil-Jona Lakers; HC Sierre-Anniviers; Kölner Haie; ERC Ingolstadt; Lausitzer Füchse; Starbulls Rosenheim
- NHL draft: Undrafted
- Playing career: 2000–2020

Gregory Dean "Greg" Classen (born August 24, 1977) is a German-Canadian former professional ice hockey centre. Classen played a total of 90 games in the National Hockey League (NHL) all with the Nashville Predators. He also appeared in 321 American Hockey League (AHL) games between six seasons and four different teams. After his career in North America, he moved to Europe and retired after the 2018–19 season in the German Eishockey-Oberliga with the Rostock Piranhas. In total Classen played 21 seasons professionally with 15 different clubs. (Note: Includes NHL, AHL, SM-liiga, NLA, NLB, DEL and DEL2 clubs)

== Playing career ==
Classen played four seasons of junior hockey for the Nipawin Hawks of the SJHL from 1994 to 1998. He then went on to play two seasons of hockey at Merrimack College competing in the Hockey East Division of the NCAA. While at Merrimack, he earned a spot on the Hockey East All-Rookie Team.

After going undrafted, Classen signed as a free agent in 1999 with the National Hockey League (NHL) team Nashville Predators. In his rookie season with the Predators in 2000–01 Classen played 27 NHL games and scored a total of six points. The following season Classen got a bigger role at the club as he appeared in 55 regular season games, in which he put up 11 points. Classen also appeared in the AHL with the Predators' affiliate club Milwaukee Admirals. In the 2002–03 season, Classen's playing time with the NHL club went down significantly as he only appeared in eight games with zero points. He played 72 games with the Admirals where he scored 48 points. The following season Classen only played with the Admirals. He appeared in 68 games and was the club's assistant captain. The Admirals won the AHL championship.

In 2004 Classen signed with Finnish SM-liiga club Porin Ässät for one season. Classen played 42 regular season games with Ässät and scored a total of 18 points. Ässät's playoff run was cut short after only two games.

The 2005–06 season saw Classen return to the Milwaukee Admirals. He played the following season in Germany with DEL club Hamburg Freezers.

On July 3, 2007, it was announced he had signed a contract with the Vancouver Canucks. He was then reassigned by the Canucks, and played with their American Hockey League affiliate, the Manitoba Moose.

He moved to fellow AHL team Providence Bruins the following season and after 1 game moved onto the San Antonio Rampage before leaving for the German team, Iserlohn Roosters, where he spent the remainder of the 2008-09 campaign.

He started the 2009–10 season with the Rapperswil-Jona Lakers of the Swiss top flight, before transferring to second-division side EHC Basel Sharks during the season. In January 2010, he moved on to another Swiss team, HC Sierre-Anniviers.

On July 18, 2010, Classen returned to the German DEL and signed a two-year contract with Kölner Haie. After three seasons with Haie, Classen left as a free agent to sign with ERC Ingolstadt. Classen won the DEL championship with Ingolstadt.

In 2014, he joined German second-division side Lausitzer Füchse on a two-year deal. On March 14, 2015, he was attacked with a knife and severely injured. He was hospitalized for almost a month and returned to game action in September 2015. Classen left the Füchse squad upon the conclusion of the 2015-16 campaign and was signed by fellow DEL2 side Starbulls Rosenheim on August 27, 2016.

Classen moved on to a Player-Assistant Coach role for two seasons (2017–18 and 2018–19) with the Rostocker EC Piranhas of the German Eishockey-Oberliga. In the two seasons he played with the Piranhas, Classen appeared in 78 regular season games where he put up 74 points. Classen retired after the 2018–19 season.

== Personal life ==
Classen was born in Aylsham, Saskatchewan, on August 24, 1977. Classen holds the citizenships of Canada and Germany.

Classen's parents Gord and Marjorie were killed by an impaired driver in a head-on collision on Saskatchewan Highway 41 between Saskatoon and Aberdeen on January 23, 2020. Classen's hockey career ended abruptly as a result.

== Career statistics ==
			Regular season					Playoffs
Season	Team	League	GP	G	A	Pts	PIM	GP	G	A	Pts	PIM
1997–98	Nipawin Hawks	SJHL	59	32	50	82	50	—	—	—	—	—
1998–99	Merrimack College	HE	36	14	11	25	28	—	—	—	—	—
1999–00	Merrimack College	HE	36	14	16	30	16	—	—	—	—	—
1999–00	Milwaukee Admirals	IHL	11	1	0	1	2	2	0	0	0	2
2000–01	Milwaukee Admirals	IHL	23	5	10	15	31	5	0	0	0	0
2000–01	Nashville Predators	NHL	27	2	4	6	14	—	—	—	—	—
2001–02	Nashville Predators	NHL	55	5	6	11	30	—	—	—	—	—
2001–02	Milwaukee Admirals	AHL	8	2	4	6	12	—	—	—	—	—
2002–03	Milwaukee Admirals	AHL	72	20	28	48	61	6	1	1	2	4
2002–03	Nashville Predators	NHL	8	0	0	0	4	—	—	—	—	—
2003–04	Milwaukee Admirals	AHL	68	18	29	47	95	20	4	3	7	12
2004–05	Porin Ässät	SM-l	42	8	10	18	74	2	0	0	0	0
2005–06	Milwaukee Admirals	AHL	76	24	26	50	67	21	1	15	16	18
2006–07	Hamburg Freezers	DEL	50	9	26	35	70	7	1	0	1	14
2007–08	Manitoba Moose	AHL	77	11	15	26	67	6	1	1	2	6
2008–09	Providence Bruins	AHL	1	0	0	0	2	—	—	—	—	—
2008–09	San Antonio Rampage	AHL	19	2	5	7	14	—	—	—	—	—
2008–09	Iserlohn Roosters	DEL	24	5	5	10	10	—	—	—	—	—
2009–10	EHC Basel	NLB	22	2	9	11	24	—	—	—	—	—
2009–10	Rapperswil-Jona Lakers	NLA	2	0	0	0	2	—	—	—	—	—
2009–10	HC Sierre	NLB	—	—	—	—	—	4	0	1	1	2
2010–11	Kölner Haie	DEL	45	10	17	27	30	5	1	1	2	2
2011–12	Kölner Haie	DEL	52	5	8	13	36	6	0	0	0	6
2012–13	Kölner Haie	DEL	45	1	5	6	10	12	1	2	3	18
2013–14	ERC Ingolstadt	DEL	43	3	6	9	32	18	1	0	1	2
2014–15	Lausitzer Füchse	DEL2	51	10	35	45	51	3	1	0	1	0
2015–16	Lausitzer Füchse	DEL2	52	10	23	33	32	—	—	—	—	—
2016–17	Rosenheim Star Bulls	DEL2	52	7	14	21	28	-	-	-	-	-
2017–18	Rostock Piranhas	GerObL	30	10	18	28	54	—	—	—	—	—
2018–19	Rostock Piranhas	GerObL	48	13	33	46	44	-	-	-	-	-
NHL totals			90	7	10	17	48	—	—	—	—	—
AHL totals			321	77	107	184	318	53	7	20	27	40
DEL totals			259	33	67	100	188	48	4	3	7	42

== Awards and honors ==
Award	Year
College
Hockey East Rookie Team	1998–99
AHL
Calder Cup champion	2004
DEL
DEL champion	2014
