= William G. Doty (scholar) =

American scholar of religious studies

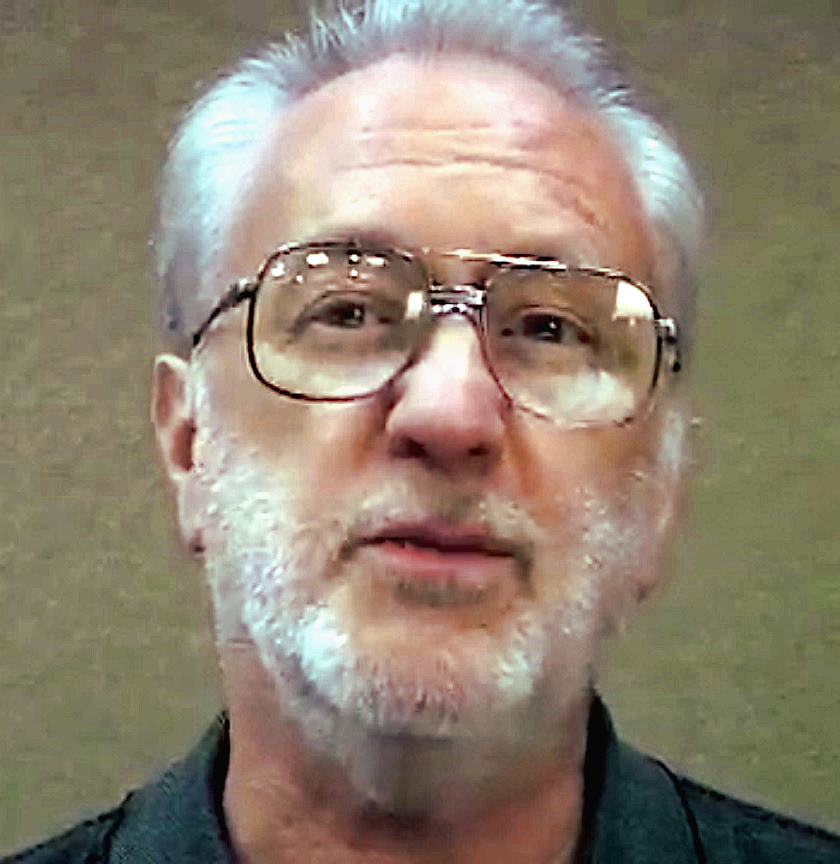
William Doty 2004

William G. Doty (1939–2017) was an American religious studies scholar and educator. He is an author and editor known for his writings about myth and mythology.

== Career ==
Doty was a professor emeritus of humanities and religious studies at the University of Alabama. He also served as Goodwin-Philpott Eminent Scholar in History at Auburn University in 1997 and 1998.

Doty published fourteen books and over seventy essays, including studies about anthropology, psychology, classics, art criticism and literary criticism.

With William J. Hynes, Doty edited and contributed to the 1993 book Mythical Trickster Figures. Another of his writings about mythology is the 2000 book Mythography: The Study of Myths and Rituals, which the Oxford Companion to World Mythology describes as "the most comprehensive and definitive study of the primary intellectual currents in the study of myths". A frequent theme in his writing was the process by which myths changed meaning and purpose depending on the life situation of the storyteller.

Doty also served as lecturer, translator and editor.

== Selective publications ==
- Mythical Trickster Figures (editor) (1993)
- Mythography: The Study of Myths and Rituals (2000)
- The Times World Mythology (2002)
- Myth: A Handbook (2004)
- Jacking In To the Matrix Franchise with Matthew Kapell (2004)
