= James L. Baughman =

American historian

James L. Baughman (January 10, 1952 - March 26, 2016) was an American mass communication historian, and the Fetzer-Bascom Professor in the School of Journalism and Mass Communication at the University of Wisconsin-Madison.

== Early life and education ==
James L. Baughman was born in Warren, Ohio on January 10, 1952, the son of Lewis E. and Ann B. Baughman. Baughman grew up in Warren and attended the Warren City Schools. He was a lifelong and passionate fan of the Cleveland Indians.

Baughman received his BA in history from Harvard University in 1974. He attended graduate school at Columbia University, where he obtained his M.A., M.Phil and Ph.D. degrees, all in history. His doctoral adviser at Columbia was the renowned historian William E. Leuchtenburg.

== Academic career ==
James Baughman taught at the University of Wisconsin-Madison from 1979 until 2016. He served as Director of the School of Journalism and Mass Communication from 2003 to 2009. An exceptionally popular professor with students, he won the Chancellor's Distinguished Teaching Award in 2003. He looked the part of a professor, always wearing a jacket and tie to class. He smoked a pipe and liked to tell funny stories or do impressions of historical figures over a glass of scotch. He believed deeply in the power of the written word. When students or friends experienced major life challenges or traumatic events, he always encouraged them to "write about it."

During his long career at the University of Wisconsin, he authored four books on the history of mass communication in the United States. His 1992 book The Republic of Mass Culture: Journalism, Filmmaking, and Broadcasting in America since 1941 explained how the advent of television transformed mass culture in the United States. Baughman argued that television had a greater impact on its rivals—such as newspapers, radio broadcasters, and the film industry—than it did on society as a whole. As he put it:

"Indeed, the effects [of television] that can be demonstrated are institutional, not social. Some of TV's rivals adjusted quickly to the challenge of the home screen; others showed what in retrospect appears to have been an almost self-destructive indifference. But nearly all came to adopt a common anti-TV strategy. Recognizing television's capture of the mass audience, most began cultivating the subgroup, segments of the audience denoted by such factors as class, education or age."

Baughman's 2007 book Same Time, Same Station: Creating American Television, 1948-1961 described how the American television industry became fixated on commercial advertising and high ratings. As he explained:

"Commercial television gradually stopped caring. In the late 1960s, Congress reluctantly created the Public Broadcasting Service. Over time, PBS relieved the networks of the cultural production attempted a decade earlier. It also marked the beginning of a segregation, cemented by the diffusion of cable television in the 1980s, of taste. The networks felt increasingly free to drop programming intended to please cultural and political elites."

Reviewing the book in the April 30, 2007 issue of The New Yorker, Nicholas Lemann observed: "As the television audience grew larger and took in people from small towns and the middle of the country, it became obvious that Americans wanted predictable, familiar entertainment, featuring, as Baughman astutely observes, stock situations and stars who had unusually expressive faces that lent themselves to cartoonish mugging shown in closeup. The results were often terrific, but never uplifting."

But Baughman harbored no pretensions of cultural superiority. As he noted in the introduction to Same Time, Same Station, "I will confess to consuming much more ESPN than C-SPAN."

In addition to his academic career, Baughman served as a member of the Wisconsin Advisory Committee to the United States Commission on Civil Rights from 1985 to 1992.

== James Baughman Day ==
Baughman died of lung cancer on March 26, 2016. He was survived by his wife and best friend, Michele "Mickey" Michuda.

He continued teaching until two weeks before he succumbed to cancer. Shortly before Baughman died, Madison Mayor Paul Soglin declared March 26 James Baughman Day for "the love and intellectual passion he has inspired in his current and former students, and for his contributions to scholarship, history, journalism and education." On the day Baughman died, the University of Wisconsin School of Journalism and Mass Communication announced: "The journalism school lost a lion this morning."

== Selected publications ==
- Television's Guardians: The FCC and the Politics of Programming, 1958-1967. Knoxville: University of Tennessee Press, 1985.
- Henry R. Luce and the Rise of the American News Media. Boston: Twayne Publishers, 1987.
- The Republic of Mass Culture: Journalism, Filmmaking, and Broadcasting in America since 1941. Baltimore: Johns Hopkins University Press, 1992.
- Same Time, Same Station: Creating American Television, 1948-1961. Baltimore: Johns Hopkins University Press, 2007.
