= Ellis Cashmore =

British sociologist

Ellis Cashmore (10 February 1949 in Staffordshire, Great Britain) is a British sociologist and cultural critic. He is currently a visiting professor of sociology at Aston University. Before teaching at Aston, he used to teach culture, media and sport at Staffordshire University, starting in 1993. Before 1993, he taught sociology at the University of Tampa, Florida; and, before this, he was a lecturer in sociology at the University of Hong Kong. He is a regular contributor at Fair Observer.

== Selected works ==
=== Books authored ===
- Celebrity Culture. Routledge, 2006. ISBN 1-134-19141-3.
- The Black Culture Industry. Routledge, 2006 ISBN 1-134-80938-7.
- And There Was Television. Routledge, 2002 ISBN 1-134-87489-8.
- Dictionary of Race and Ethnic Relations. Routledge, 2002 ISBN 1-134-77388-9.

=== Contributions ===
- Screen Society. Springer, 2018. ISBN 3-319-68164-8.
- Making Sense of Sports. Psychology Press, 2005. ISBN 0-415-34853-6.
- Introduction to Race Relations. Psychology Press, 1990 ISBN 1-850-00759-4
- No Future: Youth and Society. Pearson Education, 1984 ISBN 0-435-82164-4

== Citations ==
According to website Briswa, co-founded by Erasmus Programme, Ellis Cashmore "is probably one of the first researchers to investigate racism in football". His works have been cited by other authors and academics, including Dorceta Taylor (The Environment and the People in American Cities, 2009), Yulisa Amadu Maddy (Neo-Imperialism in Children's Literature About Africa 2008), Anthony G. Reddie (Theologising Brexit 2019) or Diego Medrano (Una puta albina colgada del brazo de Francisco Umbral 2010). As a researcher, he also have been cited by media outlets such as Reuters and CNN.
