= Who's Bigger? =

2013 book by Steven Skiena and Charles Ward

Who's Bigger?: Where Historical Figures Really Rank
- Author: Steven Skiena, Charles Ward
- Language: English
- Subject: History
- Published: 2013 (Cambridge University Press)
- Publication place: United Kingdom
- Media type: Print
- Pages: 408
- ISBN: 978-1107041370

Who's Bigger?: Where Historical Figures Really Rank is a 2013 book by the computer scientist Steven Skiena and the Google engineer Charles Ward which ranks historical figures in order of significance.

== Methodology ==
The authors used the English Wikipedia as their primary data source, and ran the data through algorithms written into computer programs to arrive at a ranking of all historical figures. According to the authors, a higher ranking indicates greater historical significance.

Skiena and Ward compared all English Wikipedia articles against five criteria: two that draw on Google PageRank, and three that draw on internal Wikipedia metrics: the number of times the page has been viewed, the number of edits to the page, and the size of the page. The concept is that these criteria measure the current fame of the subject. This is then manipulated by other algorithms to compensate for a skewing of data toward more recent subjects, arriving at true likely historical significance. In addition to the main list, various sublists (such as figures of a given field of endeavor or country) are included.

While the authors claim that their purely quantitative approach to the question of individual historical significance is a virtue, questions about whether the book is more than "a lot of fun" and an "entertaining exercise" include doubts whether an individual's historical significance can actually be quantitatively ascertained, how much the book's English sources skew it toward the history of the English-speaking world, whether fame over time is a good measure of significance, and whether attention to a subject in Wikipedia is a good proxy for overall fame.

While acknowledging the bias against non-Western figures and disavowing any special authoritativeness, the authors make the case that their methods are both novel and useful – for instance, that historical fame and historical significance are intertwined, that fame over time has qualities in common with the fading or staying power seen in memes, and that Wikipedia metrics provide a window into what people believe matters – and that their approach, with further refinements, may prove useful in other areas. Skiena described: "We do not answer these questions as historians might, through a principled assessment of their individual achievements. Instead, we evaluate each person by aggregating the traces of millions of opinions in a rigorous and principled manner... We measure meme strength, how successfully is the idea of this person being propagated through time."

Regarding the relative paucity of women on the list (only three of the top 100 figures are women), the authors point out past barriers to women assuming historically significant roles. However, critics have also postulated a bias in the underlying data source, since only 15% of English Wikipedia editors are female. The authors acknowledge this as a potential issue (the authors allow that "[T]he English-language Wikipedia is inherently culturally biased... The Wikipedia authors did not leave their prejudices at the door, so any results concerning minorities and gender reflect attitudes as well as accomplishments") and in fact Skiena notes that, statistically speaking, in order to gain a Wikipedia entry a woman has to be somewhat more accomplished than a man. Skiena stated: "Our methods show that for historical figures from the past 300 years, the average significance of women appearing in Wikipedia was substantially greater than that of the average man. This implies that women required greater credentials to get into Wikipedia, analogous to being about 4 IQ points smarter in the mean. Fortunately, this significance gap has closed and essentially eliminated in modern times."

== See also ==
- The 100: A Ranking of the Most Influential Persons in History
- Bibliography of Wikipedia
