= Top 100 =

Top 100 may refer to:

== Music ==
- Rolling Stone Top 100, in the United States
- Billboard Hot 100, in the United States
- Triple J Hottest 100, an annual favourite song list, based on the votes of Australian youth radio station Triple J listeners

== Publications ==
- The 100: A Ranking of the Most Influential Persons in History, a 1978 book by Michael H. Hart
- The Top 100 Crime Novels of All Time, a list published in book form in 1990 by the UK-based Crime Writers' Association
- 100 Women (BBC), a BBC multi-format series established in 2013, examining the role of women in the 21st century

== Television ==
- Greatest South Africans (television series), the 100 greatest South Africans of all time

== Gaming ==
- Mario Party: The Top 100, a Nintendo 3DS game featuring 100 minigames taken from the ten console Mario Party games.
