= Karlene Faith =

Canadian writer and academic (1938–2017)

- Born: 1938; Aylsham, Saskatchewan, Canada
- Died: May 15, 2017 (aged 78–79); Vancouver, British Columbia, Canada
- Education: University of California, Santa Cruz (BA, PhD)

Karlene Faith (1938 – May 15, 2017) was a Canadian writer, feminist, scholar, and human rights activist. She was a professor emerita at the Simon Fraser University School of Criminology.

== Early life and career ==
Karlene Faith was born in Aylsham, Saskatchewan, in 1938. She was the oldest of six children and her father was a United Church Minister. After moving to a small town in Montana near a jail, Faith often witnessed police brutality.

In 1970, she earned her anthropology degree with Highest Honors at the University of California, Santa Cruz. She also played a role in developing the Santa Cruz Women's Prison Project in 1972. Faith received a Danforth Fellowship to study for four more years at UC Santa Cruz, earning her Ph.D. in 1981.

== Career ==
While working at a local radio station as a record librarian, she was given air play to read teletype news on the Korean War, the House Un-American Activities Committee, and other events.

By the time she was 30, Faith had worked in the United States, Germany, France, and Eritrea studying music, going to school, teaching, and working with the Peace Corps.

Faith's PhD Thesis was an anthropological overview of the Rastafari.

In the mid-1970s, she worked with the Manson women, Susan Atkins, Patricia Krenwinkel, and Leslie Van Houten, at the California Institution for Women. She later wrote a book about her work with the women. In her book, The Long Prison Journey of Leslie Van Houten, she tells how two of the women believed that they would "grow wings and become fairies," a belief that they obtained from Charles Manson. Faith viewed all of these women as victims, and lobbied for their early release from prison.

She has co-hosted the radio show "Criminal Justice on Trial," taught with Dr. Rafael Guzman at Correctional Training Facility in Soledad, California. She also conducted research at the California Institution for Women.

=== Writing and awards ===
She wrote many books on women and their incarceration. Her first book Unruly Women: The Politics of Confinement and Resistance was first published in 1993 through Press Gang and has been called "path breaking" because of its historical overview of draconian social control practices. It went on to win the VanCity Book Prize in 1994. In 1997, Faith wrote Madonna: Bawdy & Soul.

In 2001, University Press of New England published Faith's book The Long Prison Journey of Leslie van Houten: Life Beyond the Cult.

Faith was the recipient of the dean of arts medal for research, teaching, and service focus from Simon Fraser University in 2002. In 2000, she received the International Helen prize for Humanitarian Works, and in 2001 she received a lifetime achievement award from the American Society for Criminology.

== Personal life ==
She died of an aortic aneurysm on May 15, 2017, in Vancouver, Canada.

== In popular culture ==
Faith is portrayed in the feature film Charlie Says by actress Merritt Wever. The film is partly based on Faith's book, The Long Prison Journey of Leslie Van Houten and portrays her work with the Manson women after the Tate–LaBianca murders.

== Bibliography ==
- Toward New Horizons for Women in Distance Education: International Perspectives (Routledge, 1988)
- Unruly Women: The Politics of Confinement & Resistance (Press Gang, 1st ed., 1993; Seven Stories Press, 2nd ed., 2011)
- Seeking Shelter: A State of Battered Women (edited with Dawn H. Currie, Collective Press, 1993)
- Madonna: Bawdy & Soul (University of Toronto Press, 1997)
- The Long Prison Journey of Leslie Van Houten: Life Beyond the Cult (Northeastern University Press, 2001)
