= The 100: A Ranking of the Most Influential Persons in History =

1978 book by Michael H. Hart

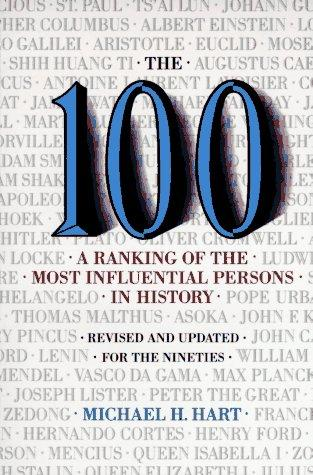
- Cover of the 1992 edition
- Author: Michael H. Hart
- Language: English
- Series: 1st edition (1978); 2nd edition (1992)
- Subject: Ranking; Biography; History
- Published: 1978 (Hart Publishing Company, New York)
- Publication place: United States
- Media type: Print
- ISBN: 9780806513508
- OCLC: 644066940

The 100: A Ranking of the Most Influential Persons in History is a 1978 book by Michael H. Hart. It is a ranking of the 100 people who, according to Hart, most influenced human history. Unlike various other rankings at the time, Hart was not attempting to rank on "greatness" as a criterion, but rather whose actions most changed the course of human history. Hart was an American astrophysicist and white nationalist, and the book was self-published by his father's publishing house. It was his first book and was reprinted in 1992 with revisions.

== Summary ==
The book contains 100 entries of various individuals, as well as an appendix of Honorable Mentions. Each entry is a short biography of the person, followed by Hart's thoughts on how this person was influential and changed the course of human history. He gave additional credit for importance for people whose actions Hart felt were unusual, unlikely, or ahead of their time compared to a hypothesized course of history had this person not lived. Some people included are Muhammad, Genghis Khan, Beethoven, and William the Conqueror.

Founders and shapers of successful religions were among the most influential in Hart's view, as these shaped many people's lives quite strongly over a long period of time. The first person on Hart's list is the Islamic prophet Muhammad. Hart asserted that Muhammad was "supremely successful" in both the religious and secular realms, being responsible for the foundations of Islam as well as being the driving force behind the Early Muslim conquests, which united the Arabian Peninsula and eventually formed wider caliphate after his death. He mentions that there is no reason to believe the Arab conquests would have occurred without Muhammad, noting that the only similar event in human history were the Mongol conquests, catalysed by Genghis Khan.

Hart also believed that Muhammad played an unusually singular and personal role in the development of Islam. The development of Christianity, by contrast, has its influence split between Jesus's initial teachings and foundational work, and Paul the Apostle, who played a pivotal role in the early spread of Christianity as well as distinguishing its doctrines and practices from Judaism and the other Greek and Roman religions of the time period. Gautama Buddha, Confucius, and Moses are all placed highly as well due to their role in establishing religions.

The list includes only two women, which Hart attributes to the fact that women have generally been denied opportunities to exert great influence throughout history. He further states that "Similar observations might be made concerning various racial or ethnic groups whose members have been disadvantaged in the past."

One of the most notable omissions was Abraham Lincoln, which Hart relegated to the "Honorary Mentions" in the appendix. Changes in the 1992 revision include the rankings of figures associated with Communism being lowered after the Revolutions of 1989, such as Vladimir Lenin and Mao Zedong, and the introduction of Mikhail Gorbachev. Hart took sides in the Shakespearean authorship issue and replaced William Shakespeare with Edward de Vere, 17th Earl of Oxford in the 1992 version. Hart also substituted Niels Bohr and Henri Becquerel with Ernest Rutherford. Henry Ford was promoted from the "Honorary Mentions" list, replacing Pablo Picasso. Finally, various rankings were re-ordered, although no one listed in the top ten changed their position.

The book was first published in 1978, as imprinted with "Hart Publishing Company." According to the Calgary Herald, at least 60,000 copies were sold. The book has since been translated into many languages.

=== Hart's Top 10 (from the 1992 edition) ===
Rank	Name	Time frame	Image	Occupation
1	Muhammad	c. 570–632		Military and religious leader, social reformer, lawmaker
2	Isaac Newton	1643–1727		Scientist
3	Jesus	4 BC–33 AD		Spiritual leader
4	Siddhartha Gautama	563–483 BC		Spiritual leader
5	Confucius	551–479 BC		Philosopher
6	Paul the Apostle	5–67 AD		Christian apostle
7	Cai Lun	50–121 AD		Inventor of paper
8	Johannes Gutenberg	c. 1400–1468		Inventor of the printing press
9	Christopher Columbus	1451–1506		Explorer
10	Albert Einstein	1879–1955		Scientist

== Reception ==
For placing Muhammad in first place on the list, the book generated controversy from western critics, but this was widely welcomed in the Muslim world and is cited in the books of Muslim writers such as Mohammad al-Shirazi and Ahmed Deedat. In 1988, then-Egyptian president Hosni Mubarak honored Michael Hart for placing Muhammad first. This is despite the fact that Hart attributes the authorship of the Quran to Muhammad, which contradicts Muslim belief. Steven Skiena and Charles Ward writes in their book Who's Bigger? that The 100: A Ranking of the Most Influential Persons in History "is probably the best known ranking of historic figures by influence."

== Sequel ==
Hart wrote the 1999 follow-up A View from the Year 3000, voiced in the perspective of a person from that future year and ranking the most influential people in history. Roughly half the entries are fictional people from 2000 to 3000, but the remainder are taken mostly from the 1992 ranking, with some sequence changes.

== See also ==
- Time 100
- Who's Bigger?
