= Muhammad Mojlum Khan =

Bangladeshi-born British historian and writer (born 1973)

- Born: 6 December 1973 (age 52); Sylhet District, Bangladesh
- Education: University of East Anglia
- Occupations: Writer, literary critic, scholar
- Spouse: Fahmida Khan
- Children: 2
- Writing career
- Language: English
- Years active: 1993–present
- Genre: Non-fiction
- Subjects: Islam, comparative religion, contemporary thought, current affairs, history

Muhammad Mojlum Khan (born 6 December 1973) is a British historian, writer, and literary critic.

== Early life ==
Muhammad Mojlum Khan was born on 6 December 1973 in the Habiganj subdistrict of Sylhet District, Bangladesh. His father, Muhammad Yawar Khan (1932–1988), was a direct descendant of Inayetullah Khan, a 17th-century Mughal faujdar of Sylhet.

Khan was raised in Burnley, United Kingdom, where he attended primary and secondary school. Following the death of his father in 1988, he focused on education and religious studies. In the early 1990s, he began formal study in Islamic studies and the social sciences. He later graduated with a BA (Hons) in Business and Social Policy from the University of East Anglia, and, in 2011, completed a Professional Graduate Certificate in Education (PGCE), qualifying as a teacher. He also undertook two years of PhD-level training in research methodology and techniques.

== Career ==
Khan is a British writer, literary critic, and research scholar, known for his contributions to Islamic thought, history, and comparative religion. Since the early 1990s, he has published over 200 essays, articles, and reviews in international journals and periodicals. His work has appeared in The Muslim News (UK), Milli Gazette (India), The Tri-State Muslim (USA), PIPFA Quarterly Journal (Pakistan), Islamic Research Journal (Bangladesh), and the Journal of the Muslim World League (Saudi Arabia), among others.

Khan is the author of several non-fiction books, including:

- The Muslim 100: The Lives, Thoughts and Achievements of the Most Influential Muslims in History (2008; reprinted 2010, 2021)
- The Muslim Heritage of Bengal (2013)
- Great Muslims of the West: Makers of Western Islam (2017)

He has also worked as a book reviewer for The Muslim News (London) for over two decades and was a contributor to BBC local radio for more than ten years.

In addition to his writing and broadcasting, Khan has delivered lectures at institutions including the East London Mosque, King's College London, and the University of Oxford. He is the founding director of the Bengal Muslim Research Institute UK, a fellow of the Royal Asiatic Society of Great Britain and Ireland, and has served as chair of the Ipswich and Suffolk Muslim Council as well as founding the BSC Multicultural Services.

In 2016, Khan was interviewed by The Islam Channel (London) for a documentary on The Muslim Heritage of Bangladesh.

== Awards and honours ==
Khan is the recipient of one international and two national prizes for his essays on Islam. He was elected a Fellow of the Royal Asiatic Society of Great Britain and Ireland, recognising his contributions to Islamic and South Asian studies. He is also a member of the Royal Historical Society and serves as the founding director of the Bengal Muslim Research Institute UK.

== Personal life ==
Khan is married to childminder Fahmida Khan. He lives in Ipswich, Suffolk with his family. In 1988, his father, Muhammad Pathan Yawar Khan, died. He also has two children, Muhtadi Khan (born 2001) and Mustafa Khan (born 2003).

== Books ==
Year	Title	Publisher	ISBN
2008	The Muslim 100: The Lives, Thoughts and Achievements of the Most Influential Muslims in History	Kube Publishing Ltd	978-1847740069
2013	The Muslim Heritage of Bengal: The Lives, Thoughts and Achievements of Great Muslim Scholars, Writers and Reformers of Bangladesh and West Bengal	Kube Publishing Ltd	978-1-84774-052-6
2017	Great Muslims of the West: Makers of Western Islam	Kube Publishing Ltd	9781847741127

== See also ==
- British Bangladeshis
- List of British Bangladeshis
