= Steven Skiena =

American computer scientist

Steven Sol Skiena
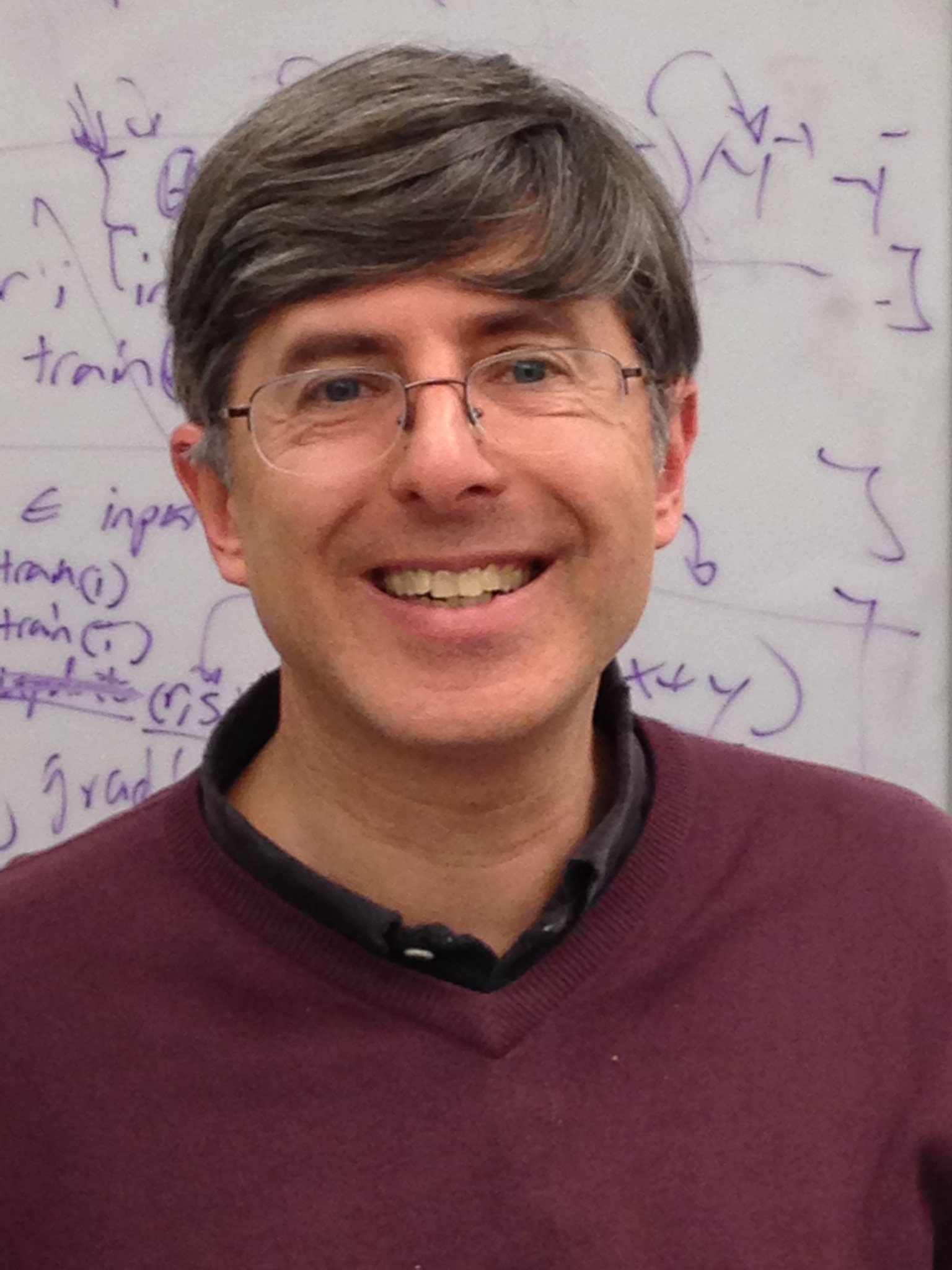
- Born: January 30, 1961 (age 65)
- Education: University of Illinois at Urbana-Champaign
- Scientific career
- Fields: Computer science
- Workplaces: Stony Brook University (1988–present)
- Doctoral advisor: Herbert Edelsbrunner

Steven Sol Skiena (born January 30, 1961) is a computer scientist and distinguished teaching professor of computer science at Stony Brook University. He is also associate director of the AI Innovation Institute at Stony Brook.

He was co-founder of General Sentiment, a social media and news analytics company, and served as chief science officer from 2009 until it shut down in 2015. His research interests include algorithm design and its applications to biology. Skiena is the author of several popular books in the fields of algorithms, programming, and mathematics. The Algorithm Design Manual is widely used as an undergraduate text in algorithms and within the tech industry for job interview preparation. In 2001, Skiena was awarded the IEEE Computer Science and Engineering Undergraduate Teaching Award "for outstanding contributions to undergraduate education in the areas of algorithms and discrete mathematics and for influential textbook and software."

Skiena has worked on algorithmic problems in synthetic biology, and, in particular, issues of optimal gene design for a given protein under various constraints. In collaboration with virologist Eckard Wimmer, he has worked to computationally design synthetic viruses for use as attenuated vaccines. Their Synthetic Attenuated Virus Engineering (SAVE) approach has been validated in flu and experiments with other viruses are ongoing. A popular account of this work appears in Dennis Shasha and Cathy Lazare's Natural Computing.

Skiena played a role in the conception of the Apple iPad. In 1988, Skiena and his team won a competition run by Apple to design the Computer of the Year 2000. Their design, a tablet featuring a touch screen, GPS, and wireless communications was similar in many regards to the iPad as released by Apple in 2010.

== Bibliography ==
- Skiena, Steven (2017). The Data Science Design Manual. Springer Nature. ISBN 978-3319554433.
- Skiena, Steven; Ward, Charles (2013). Who's Bigger: Where Historical Figures Really Rank. Cambridge University Press. ISBN 978-1107041370.
- Skiena, Steven (2010). The Algorithm Design Manual (2nd ed.). Springer Science+Business Media. ISBN 978-1-849-96720-4.
- Skiena, Steven; Revilla, Miguel (2003). Programming Challenges: The Programming Contest Training Manual (1st ed.). Springer Science+Business Media. ISBN 0-387-00163-8.
- Skiena, Steven (2001). Calculated Bets: Computers, Gambling, and Mathematical Modeling to Win (Outlooks) (1st ed.). Cambridge University Press. ISBN 0-521-00962-6.
- Pemmaraju, Sriram; Skiena, Steven (15 October 2009). Computational Discrete Mathematics: Combinatorics and Graph Theory with Mathematics (1st ed.). Cambridge University Press. ISBN 978-0-521-12146-0.
