= The Manic Monologues =

Play based on accounts of mental illness

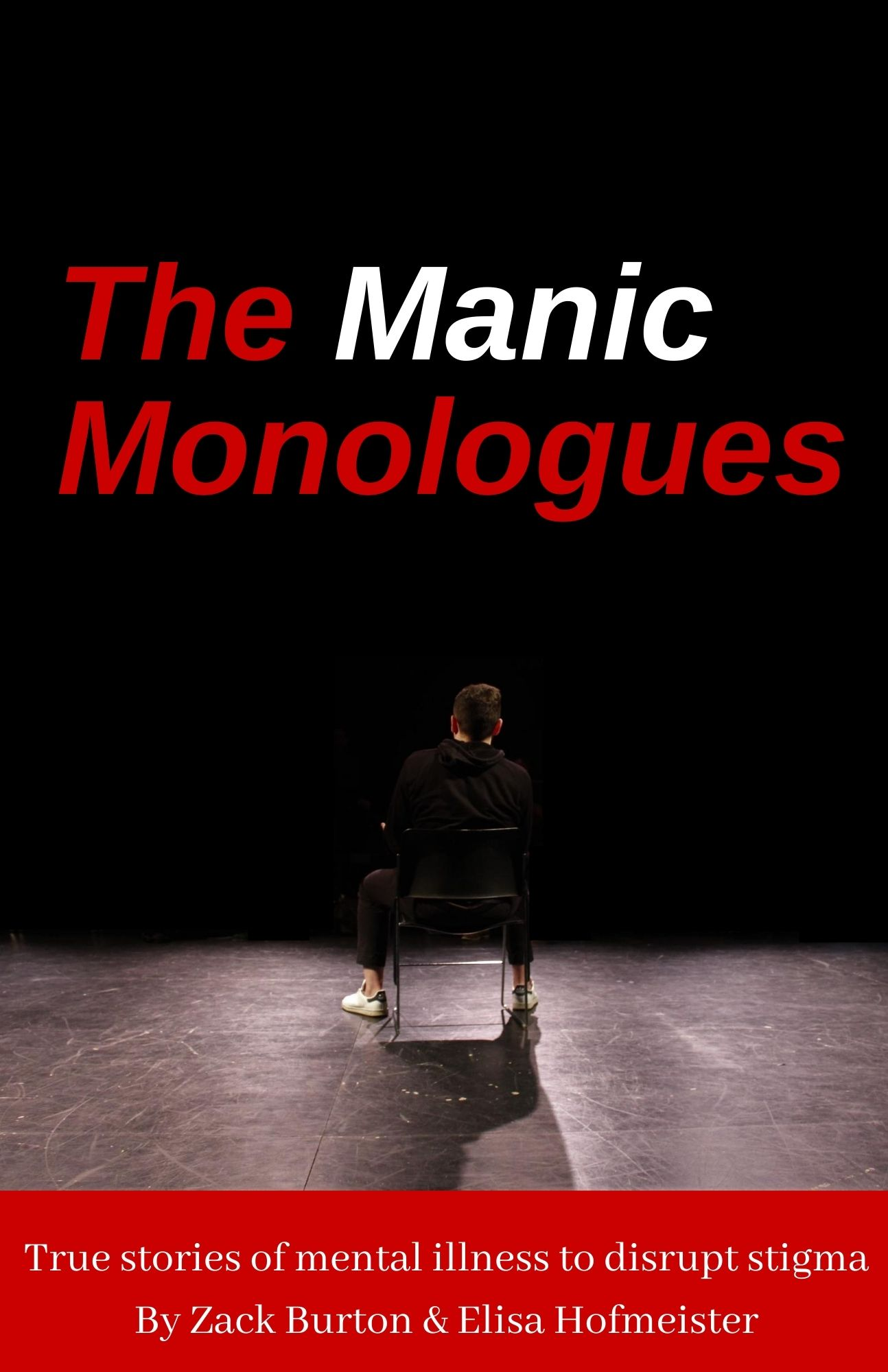
- Original language: English
- Written by: Zachary Burton and Elisa Hofmeister
- Subject: Mental illness

Premiere
- Date: May 2019
- Place: Stanford University, California, USA

The Manic Monologues is a play created and premiered by scientist and mental health advocate Zachary Burton and medical professional Elisa Hofmeister. The play consists of autobiographical accounts of mental illness from people diagnosed with mental health conditions, the family and friends of mental health patients, and health professionals. The play explores diagnoses including bipolar, schizophrenia, depression, anxiety, obsessive–compulsive disorder (OCD), and post-traumatic stress disorder (PTSD) in stories that are by turns tragic, humorous, and uplifting.

The play aims to reduce the stigma surrounding mental health and illness. The Washington Post calls it "a play that hopes to smash the stigma surrounding mental illness".

Since premiering in California in 2019, the play has been performed in over a dozen U.S. states and in countries across Africa, Australasia, Europe, and North America. The play has garnered international acclaim including as a nominee for the 2021 Drama League Awards, winner of the 2023 Kenya Theatre Awards, winner of the 2024 BroadwayWorld Awards, and various other accolades.

== Background ==
Burton and Hofmeister wrote the play in the wake of Burton's 2017 bipolar diagnosis while a doctoral student at Stanford University. They drew inspiration from The Vagina Monologues, and incorporated approximately 20 true stories of mental illness provided by individuals across the U.S., Canada, and elsewhere. During development, Burton and Hofmeister assembled a team of renowned advisors who consulted on the script and production. The founding team included psychiatrist and Stanford professor Rona Hu (who served as advisor to the first season of Netflix's 13 Reasons Why), psychologist and UC Berkeley professor Stephen P. Hinshaw (who also introduced Burton to Glenn Close; Hinshaw and Burton served as advisors to Close’s mental health nonprofit Bring Change to Mind), advocate and performer Victoria Maxwell, editor Tom Shroder, physician and Emmy Award winner Seema Yasmin, and playwright and Pulitzer Prize finalist Amy Freed, with later additions to the advisory team including advocate Kenidra Woods and retired U.S. Army Major General Gregg F. Martin.

== Productions ==
=== Beginnings (2019–2020) ===
The Manic Monologues premiered May 2019 (Mental Health Awareness Month) at Stanford University’s 192-seat Pigott Theatre. The play ran for three fully sold-out nights, to standing ovations and recognition from local media, NPR, The Washington Post, and the National Alliance on Mental Illness. In November 2019, the play was produced by Open Door Rep at Franklin Center Theater in Des Moines, Iowa. The sold-out production raised thousands of dollars for NAMI, and won a Cloris Award for “outstanding contributions to theatre in greater Des Moines” at the 2020 Cloris Leachman Excellence in Theatre Arts Awards (in 2022, Next to Normal also won a Cloris Award). In February 2020, members of the original Stanford cast (with direction by Burton) presented the Los Angeles premiere of the play as a sold-out matinee at UCLA’s 278-seat James Bridges Theater, at the invitation of the Semel Institute for Neuroscience and Human Behavior.

=== Virtual productions (2020–2022) ===
During the global COVID-19 pandemic, Burton and additional adapters of The Manic Monologues produced various virtual and digital formats.

In August 2020, following in-person performance cancellations (in North Carolina, for example), Burton led development of a film adaptation of The Manic Monologues, with filming taking place in Orlando, Florida. In September 2020, the film premiered as keynote for the 30th Annual Executive Conference on Mission of AdventHealth, a 50-hospital nonprofit healthcare system. Screenings quickly followed for numerous major conferences and symposia, including in October 2020 for Mental Illness Awareness Week via Stanford Medicine’s Medicine & the Muse Program, in November 2020 as closing keynote at the Year-End Executive Meeting of the Adventist North American Division, in December 2020 as closing at California Hospital Association’s 15th Annual Behavioral Health Care Symposium keynote for 400 hospitals (representing over 97% of patient beds in California), as plenary session for the 2021 Mayo Clinic Annual Humanities in Medicine Symposium , as session topic for the May 2021 Annual Meeting of the American Psychiatric Association, and for NAMI San Francisco’s May 2021 Mental Health Awareness Month program featuring Burton, Hu, and author Sophie Littlefield. The film has since shown for thousands, including as frequent programming for medical schools (e.g., Stanford School of Medicine, Mayo Clinic, Yale School of Medicine and Yale New Haven Hospital, Columbia University and the Columbia-WHO Center for Global Mental Health, and the Burnett School of Medicine at TCU), universities and colleges (e.g., in Bowdoin College Visual Arts Center’s 300-seat Kresge Auditorium, in Viterbo University Fine Arts Center’s 170-seat Nola Starling Recital Hall), and public health and mental health advocacy organizations (e.g., Humboldt County Department of Health and Human Services; Orygen Global’s inaugural 2021 Youth Mental Health Advocacy Fellowship and inaugural 2022 ASEAN-Australia Mental Health Fellowship, in partnership with the Australian Government), as well as corporate keynote events, such as for the World Bank Group’s inaugural Ethics and Internal Justice Week, WBG-International Finance Corporation programing, and as keynote for the 2023 global launch of World Bank’s 170-country Stigma Reduction Campaign.

In February 2021, two-time Tony Award-winning McCarter Theatre Center launched the play as an interactive "Virtual Theatrical Experience" in partnership with Princeton University, The 24 Hour Plays, and Innovations in Socially Distant Performance. Direction was provided by “form-busting” director Elena Araoz, with the creative and production team including Lucille Lortel Award-winning and two-time Obie Award-winning multimedia designer Jared Mezzocchi, musician and composer Nathan Leigh, MIT Media Lab alumna and computer programmer Jackie Liu, Broadway producer Debbie Bisno, and Burton himself. Brain health nonprofit One Mind was a production co-sponsor, with Bisno and Burton involving One Mind’s media lead, two-time Peabody and three-time Emmy Award-winner Dalton Delan. The cast featured Broadway veterans and film and television stars, including 2021 Tony Award nominee Ato Blankson-Wood, Maddie Corman, Anna Belknap, Tessa Albertson, Mike Carlsen, Alexis Cruz, Mateo Ferro, Sam Morales, Bi Jean Ngo, Armando Riesco, Jon Norman Schneider, Obie and Audie Award-winner Heather Alicia Simms, Lortel nominee C. J. Wilson, Tony nominee Craig Bierko, as well as Obie, Drama Desk, and Tony Award-winner Wilson Jermaine Heredia (1996 Tony Award for Best Performance by an Actor in a Featured Role in a Musical for his role as Angel in Pulitzer Prize-winning Rent). The production also featured resources and conversations, with keynote by Burton and Bisno, and speakers including mental health professionals (Stanford’s Dr. Rona Hu, Princeton’s Dr. Calvin Chin, Georgia Tech’s Dr. Munmun De Choudhury), psychology professor and author Jean Twenge, Letters to Strangers founder Diana Chao, and actress and Twitch streamer Sarah Daniels. Among widespread media coverage, Burton was interviewed by Frank DiLella, 11-time Emmy-winning host of NYC’s celebrated “On Stage” theater show, as well as by Christopher Zara for Fast Company. The Manic Monologues production was widely lauded as a groundbreaking triumph in virtual theatre, securing a nomination for America’s oldest theatrical honors, The Drama League Awards, which marked the first time in the 87-year history of the Awards that any production outside Broadway and Off-Broadway was recognized. The production also earned a nomination for the Casting Society of America’s 2022 Artios Awards, alongside titles including Fargo, Ted Lasso, Encanto, and film adaptations In the Heights and Spielberg-directed West Side Story. The production won the 2021–2022 National Association of Student Personnel Administrators Excellence Awards for transformative programming across higher education, and has since been used for university programming ranging from Princeton University’s first-year orientation program to University of South Florida St. Petersburg’s Active Minds programs.

Additional virtual productions quickly followed the McCarter debut. In April 2021, the Center for Performing Arts at Maryland’s Prince George’s Community College debuted a virtual performance of the play. In June 2021, Arizona’s Virtual Theater Lab debuted the first live Zoom-based performance of the play, earning multiple nominations for the 2021 BroadwayWorld Phoenix Awards, including the award for “Best Streaming Play.” In October 2021, Michigan’s Kendall College of Art and Design of Ferris State University produced the first “hybrid” in-person plus virtual production of the play, with the show’s success leading KCAD to organize a second hybrid production in March 2023 In February 2022, Zucker School of Medicine partnered with New York’s largest healthcare provider, Northwell Health, to produce a livestreamed performance with a cast composed of medical students, physicians, and professors.

=== Return to the stage (2022–present) ===
The Manic Monologues returned to in-person audiences via multiple May 2022 performances honoring Mental Health Awareness Month. Performances—and major regional and international premieres—continue through 2024 and 2025.

Notably, May 2022 saw the play’s Off West End premiere, with The Manic Monologues opening at London’s Offie Award-winning Golden Goose Theatre for a May and June run.

In the U.S., on-stage May 2022 performances included the first high school production of the play (by students from Miss Porter’s School in Connecticut) and a week-long professional run at New Tampa Players’ Uptown Stage, in partnership with the Crisis Center of Tampa Bay and with support from the Florida Division of Cultural Affairs and Hillsborough County Government. In December 2022, the play was produced by Hawaiʻi Pacific University at downtown Honolulu’s Aloha Tower Marketplace.

Alongside the European debut, 2022 also saw the African debut of The Manic Monologues. In October 2022, coinciding with World Mental Health Day, the play premiered via a fully sold-out, five-performance run at Signature Auditorium in Nairobi, Kenya. Direction was provided by Mugambi Nthiga, who, among other credits, directed Les Rimbaud du Cinéma Award-winner Lusala, starred in Teddy Award-winner Stories of Our Lives and Nairobi Half Life, and co-wrote TIFF Award-winner Kati Kati and Supa Modo (the latter three of which were Kenya’s official selection for the Best Foreign Language Film Oscar at the 85th, 90th, and 91st Academy Awards, respectively). Executive production was provided by Shalini Bhalla-Lucas, while the debut featured an acclaimed cast of celebrated Kenyan actors, including Kalasha Award-winner Nyokabi Macharia, Charles Ouda, Elsaphan Njora, Julisa Rowe, Vikash Pattni, 18 Hours star Nick Ndeda, Kalasha nominee Auudi Rowa, and Kalasha nominee Wakio Mzenge (2023 Kenya Theatre Awards winner for her performance in The Manic Monologues, alongside Ouda, as well as a 2023 SOVAS Voice Arts Awards nominee, alongside Viola Davis, Meryl Streep, Jackie Chan, and Bono). The production garnered significant local and national media attention, and among the thousand attendees of the premiere were prominent figures supporting the play’s mission, including actresses Esther Kazungu, Mũmbi Kaigwa, Foi Wamboi, and Sarah Hassan, media personalities Ciru Muriuki, Wanjira Longauer, Anne Mwaura, Mary Mwikali, Pinky Ghelani, and Carol Radull, and singer Eric Wainaina, as well as Lupita Nyong'o’s parents, Dorothy Nyong'o and Kisumu County Governor Anyang' Nyong'o, who spoke highly of the performance and its message. The Nairobi premiere was named one of Kenya’s “outstanding plays of 2022” by Business Daily Africa, and the production earned seven nominations for the 2023 Kenya Theatre Awards, subsequently winning all three categories in which it was nominated, including "Best Adaptation" as well as "Best Performance by a Female Actor" honors for Mzenge and "Best Performance by a Male Actor" honors for Ouda.

The next major debut came in April 2023, with leading Texas professional theatre company WaterTower Theatre producing the play on its 210-seat Addison Theatre Centre Terry Martin Main Stage for a 12-performance run. The Texas debut saw the integration of live music, song, and choreographed dance for the first time, drawing critical acclaim across the Dallas–Fort Worth region and earning the production seven nominations for the 2023 BroadwayWorld Dallas Awards, including as a top contender for “Best New Play Or Musical.” April 2023 also saw the play return to California’s Bay Area, opening at Las Positas College’s Barbara F. Mertes Center for the Arts 500-seat proscenium theater, and including performances by Hu and Hinshaw.

In September 2023, the play saw global premieres in New Zealand and Slovakia.

The major debut at The Meteor Theatre in Hamilton, New Zealand opened 19–23 September 2023 as part of the country’s national Mental Health Awareness Week (supported by the Mental Health Foundation of New Zealand and Te Whatu Ora - Health New Zealand). The shows were produced by Carving in Ice Theatre at The Meteor, and featured a notably large cast of 19 actors. The performances opened each night to a full house, and the play received substantial praise and critical claim in New Zealand, including in the country’s largest newspaper, The New Zealand Herald and in the Waikato Times, who at the end of the year also named the production to the region’s “theatrical top 10 of 2023.”

The Slovakian premiere of The Manic Monologues (“Manické Monológy”) was translated and produced by multi-DOSKY Award-winning theatre company Divadlo Kontra ("The Opposition Theatre"), opening September 30, 2023 in historic Spišská Nová Ves, Slovakia. Manické Monológy later began a tour of 60 shows across Slovakia and the Czech Republic, with shows starting in Autumn 2024 and increasing in Spring and Summer 2025.

In February 2024, the play saw a major regional premiere in Boston. The Manic Monologues was the first performance in the new Arrow Street Arts theatre at Harvard Square, where it was produced by the IRNE Award- and Elliot Norton Award-winning theatre company Moonbox Productions. This multi-week run introduced shadow-cast interpretation in American Sign Language, for which it was featured by Perkins School for the Blind, and the play also drew widespread coverage and praise from outlets including Boston Magazine, The Arts Fuse Magazine, Cambridge Day, Chelsea Record, ArtsBoston, BroadwayWorld, and others. For the Boston debut, Burton partnered Moonbox with nonprofit Me2/Orchestra, described as “the world’s only classical music organization created for individuals with mental illnesses and the people who support them” and consisting of a 55-piece orchestra, flute choir, and chorus in Boston, as well as orchestras in Vermont and New Hampshire. Burton, Hu, and Me2/ founder Ronald Braunstein (who in 1979 became the first American to win the “Olympics of conducting”—the Herbert von Karajan International Conducting Competition—and who also lives with bipolar disorder) presented at the 2024 Boston premiere. In January 2025, the Boston production of The Manic Monologues was named the 2024 BroadwayWorld Awards winner for "Best Direction of a Play," and was a nominee for the "Best Play in Boston" in 2024.

In April 2024, The Manic Monologues premiered in Wyoming, a rural state in the U.S. that is the nation’s least populous. The play was produced by Western Wyoming Community College for the school’s Disability Awareness Month.

The tour of the Slovak translation of the play (titled “Manické Monológy”), produced by award-winning UK-based Polish director Klaudyna Rozhin, has included renowned venues such as Malý Berlín (Little Berlin) cultural center in Trnva, Slovakia in February 2025 and the large main hall of the Katolický dům in Kopřivnice, Czech Republic in April 2025. The play’s tour has also included several festivals in both countries, including Czechia’s 39th-annual KOPŘIVA theater festival (featuring theatres from three countries: Czechia, Slovakia, and Poland) and including Slovakia’s fourth-annual (2024) and fifth-annual (2025), month-long Adaptácie international festival (featuring theatres from five countries: Slovakia, Poland, Ukraine, Greece, and Great Britain).
