= Ahmad Al-Zaini =

Saudi politician, entrepreneur and investor

- أحمد الزيني
- Born: April 5, 1988 (age 38)
- Education: King Fahd University of Petroleum and Minerals (B.Sc. Electrical Engineering, 2012)
- Occupations: Entrepreneur, investor

Ahmad Al-Zaini (Arabic: أحمد الزيني; born April 5, 1988) is a Saudi entrepreneur and investor. He is the co-founder and chief executive officer of Foodics, a Saudi Arabian financial technology company that develops cloud-based restaurant management and payment systems.

== Biography ==
=== Early life and education ===
Ahmad Al-Zaini was born April 5, 1988 in the Kingdom of Saudi Arabia. He earned a bachelor's degree in electrical engineering from the King Fahd University of Petroleum and Minerals in 2012.

=== Career ===
In 2010, Al-Zaini co-founded ALWANS, a company focused on developing mobile applications, investing in startup ideas, and technology projects with a focus on e-commerce. He has remained on its board, with responsibilities including business growth strategies, coaching, and investment strategies.

Since 2009 he has been a charter member of the Chamber of Commerce Club and was head of the marketing committee for the Division M Toastmaster Annual Conference. Al-Zaini is also an administrator and member of the Anchorage Society for Human Resources Management (ASHRM), affiliated with the U.S.-based Society for Human Resource Management. Al-Zaini also established the Wazi Volunteering Club, which promotes awareness of the impact of technology on Saudi society.

In 2014, Al-Zaini co-founded Foodics, where he serves as CEO. The company offers a cloud-based point-of-sale platform, digital payment services, and business management tools for the food and beverage industry. Under his leadership, Foodics has expanded across the Middle East and North Africa, raising $170 million in Series C funding in 2022 and reaching more than 30,000 clients. The company has introduced products such as Foodics BI, an AI-powered analytics platform, and electronic invoicing services compliant with Saudi regulations.

In 2018, Al-Zaini was recognized by Endeavor Global as a High-Impact Entrepreneur. He was named among Forbes Middle East’s "Entrepreneurs Shaping Saudi Arabia’s Future and was included in Arabian Business’s "GCC Young Achievers" list in 2021. In 2025, he received the Inc. Arabia Best in Business Award in the fintech and financial services category on behalf of Foodics. The same year, Entrepreneur Middle East named his company Foodics the leader in F&B fintech.
