= Mental health in Turkmenistan =

The most recent Mental Health Atlas report from WHO indicated that there are currently no studies on mental health in Turkmenistan.

Mental health in Turkmenistan encompasses the prevalence, treatment, as well as societal effects of mental health conditions in the country. According to a 2020 report from the World Health Organization (WHO), there are currently no published research articles on mental health in Turkmenistan, and similarly, other data on the topic is lacking.

== Epidemiology ==
As stated by WHO, there is currently no information on the prevalence of mental illness in Turkmenistan.

== Treatment ==
=== Treatment facilities ===
There are 8 psychiatric hospitals in all of Turkmenistan.

=== Mental health professionals ===
In 2020, there were 135 mental health professionals in the entire country, consisting of 134 psychiatrists and one psychologist.

== Initiatives ==
=== 2018 World Mental Health Day conference ===
On World Mental Health Day in 2018, the WHO Country Office in Turkmenistan organised a conference of psychiatrists and family doctors, making the conference the first of its kind in Turkmenistan.

=== UNICEF mental health course ===
In 2024, UNICEF organised a six-week course on providing psychosocial support, which was attended by over 200 specialists across the country, including teachers, family doctors and social workers.
