= Yoni (disambiguation) =

Yoni is the Sanskrit word for the female genitalia.

Yoni may also refer to:

- Yoni (album), a 2007 album by Ginger
- Yonin shogi, Japanese chess
- Yoni massage
- Yoni steaming or vaginal steaming
- Yoni Expedition

== People ==
- Yoni, a popular Hebrew nickname short for Yonatan, Yonadev, or Yehonatan:
- Yoni Chetboun, Politician and a decorated officer in the Israel Defense Forces
- Yonina Eldar, Israeli academic and engineer
- Yonatan Netanyahu (1946–1976), Israeli army commander
- Yoni Erlich (born 1977), Israeli tennis player
- Yoni Wolf (born 1979), American musician
- Yoni Freedhoff, Canadian general practitioner
- Yoni (footballer) (born 1979), Spanish footballer
- Yoni Appelbaum, American historian and journalist
- Yoni Goodman, Israeli animator (born 1976)
- Yoni Rechter, Musical artist
- Yoni Buyens, Belgian footballer
- Yoni Bloch, Israeli musician
- Yoni Z, Musical artist

== Other uses ==
- Yoni Ki Baat
