= Johnny C. Taylor Jr. =

American lawyer and author

Johnny C. Taylor, Jr.
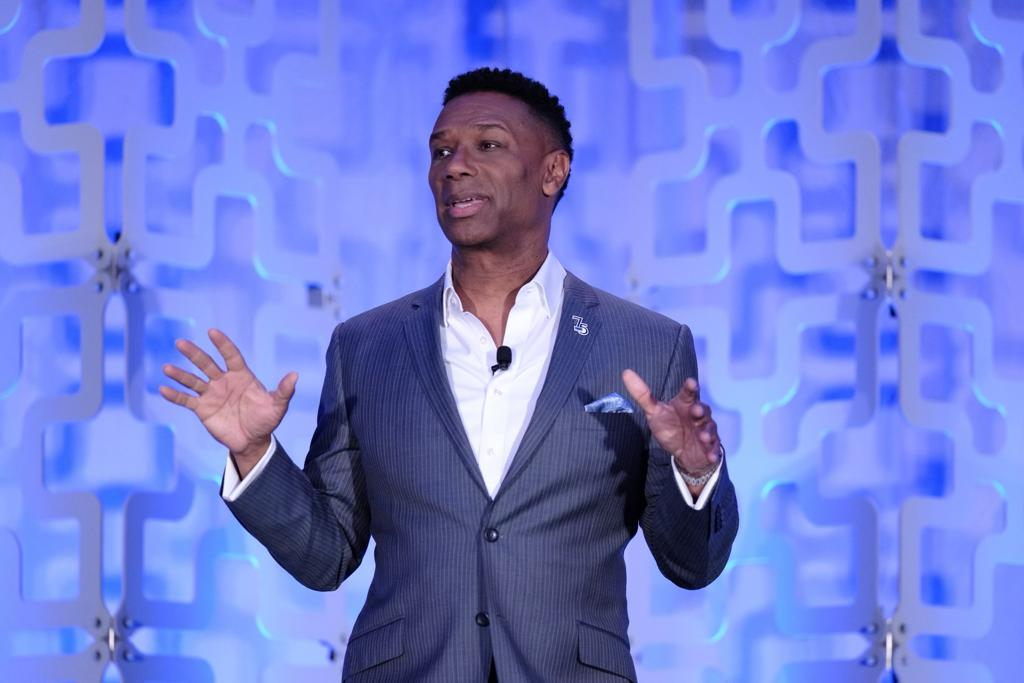
- Born: Fort Lauderdale, Florida, U.S.
- Education: University of Miami, B.S.; Drake University, M.A. and J.D.
- Occupations: President and chief executive officer, Society for Human Resource Management
- Spouse: Charlotte Smith (m. 2002; div. 2007)
- Website: johnnyctaylorjr.com www.shrm.org

Johnny Clayton Taylor Jr. is an American lawyer, author and public speaker who is the president and chief executive officer of the Society for Human Resource Management (SHRM). He was previously president and CEO of the Thurgood Marshall College Fund (TMCF), which represents the 47 publicly supported historically Black colleges and universities in the United States.

From 2018 to 2021, Taylor was chair of President Donald Trump's advisory board on historically Black colleges and universities, in addition to serving on the White House American Workforce Policy Advisory Board. He is on the Association to Advance Collegiate Schools of Business board of directors, as well as serving on the corporate boards of XPO, Inc., Flores HR, and Guild Education. Taylor is also a trustee of Jobs for America's Graduates, and was previously vice chair of the University of Miami. He is a fellow of the National Academy of Human Resources.

Taylor writes a USA Today column and hosts a podcast on topics related to human resources. A longtime public speaker, he has also testified before Congress on workforce issues.

== Early life and education ==
Taylor was born and raised in Fort Lauderdale, Florida and graduated as valedictorian of his class at Dillard High School in Broward County. He attended the University of Miami, where he was an Isaac Bashevis Singer Scholar and graduated with a Bachelor of Science in communication. Taylor went on to earn a Master of Arts from Drake University and a Juris Doctor from the Drake Law School, where he was research editor of the Drake Law Review and argued on the National Moot Court Team. He is licensed to practice law in Florida, Illinois, and Washington, D.C.

== Career ==
Taylor has held senior human resources and legal executive roles with Viacom and its subsidiaries including Blockbuster Entertainment, Paramount Pictures, and Alamo Rent a Car. He was General Counsel and Corporate Secretary for Compass Group USA before becoming partner and Chief Executive in the McGuireWoods law firm. Taylor worked for IAC/InterActiveCorp, a media company, first as the senior vice president of human resources, and then as the president and chief executive officer of IAC subsidiary RushmoreDrive.

From 2010 to 2017, Taylor led the Thurgood Marshall College Fund (TMCF). This includes 47 publicly supported historically Black colleges and universities, six law schools, two medical schools, and over 300,000 students.

On June 1, 2017, the Society for Human Resource Management (SHRM) named Taylor president and chief executive officer. Taylor led a $20 million financial turnaround of SHRM, which took a loss of $5.6 million in 2016 and registered net income of $14.1 million by 2018. He is credited with building a "challenge culture" where employee input is encouraged.

In July 2024, Taylor led SHRM's shift from diversity, equity, and inclusion (DEI) to just I&D (inclusion and diversity). He cited "societal backlash and increased polarization" in advocating for an "inclusion-first approach".

=== Author ===
Taylor wrote the 2021 book Reset: A Leader’s Guide to Work in an Age of Upheaval. He is co-author of The Trouble with HR: An Insider's Guide to Finding and Keeping the Best People, which covers employee relations, compensation and benefits, training, on-boarding, and development practices.

Taylor's weekly column in USA Today, titled "Ask HR", touches on employee burnout, job productivity, workplace culture, and other topics. In July 2024, U.S. News & World Report published an opinion piece by Taylor where he advocated for civility at work amid political tensions. Alongside Career Club president Bob Goodwin, Taylor hosts the podcast "The Work Wire", discussing how the latest news affects the workplace.

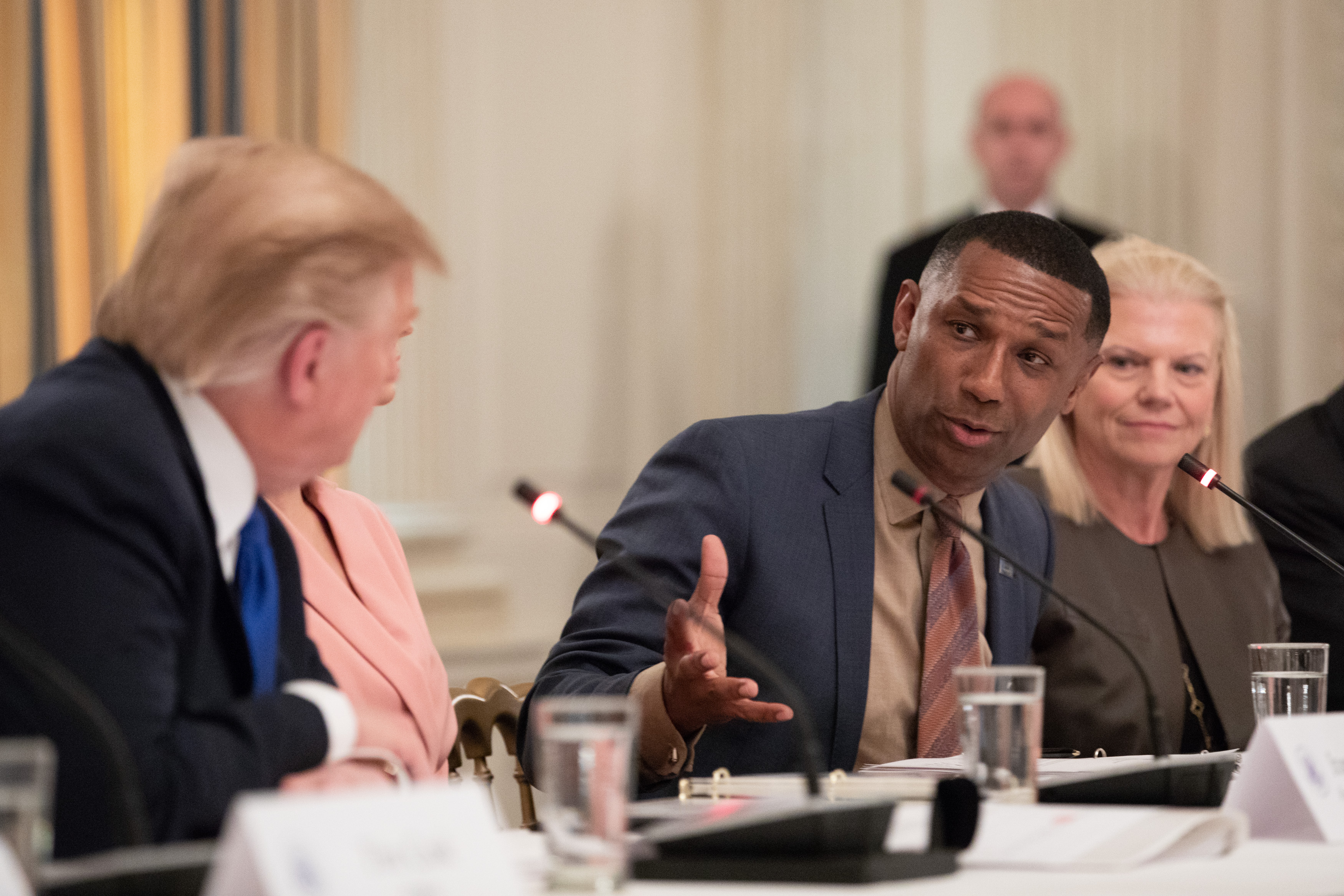
Taylor discussing workforce development with President Donald Trump in 2019

=== Public speaking ===
Taylor has delivered presentations where he discusses the future of human resources. He speaks on business leadership, diversity, management, politics at work, and human resources. Taylor has been featured by The Today Show, CNBC, Reuters, CBS Evening News, Time, Fortune, The Wall Street Journal, The Guardian, and HR Magazine, among others.

In September 2021, Taylor held a virtual event as part of the Big Ideas Speaker Series at Rotman Livestream, where he discussed his book, Reset: A Leader's Guide to Work in an Age of Upheaval, remote work, and increased focus on diversity and inclusion. In 2022, Taylor spoke at the University of Miami graduation ceremony at the Watsco Center. On December 1, 2023, he was guest speaker at the 15th Global Peter Drucker Forum in Vienna, where he discussed "Creative Resilience, Leading in an Age of Discontinuity".

In May 2024, Taylor spoke at the Milken Institute Global Conference about workforce resiliency. In October 2024, Taylor mentored students at High Point University (HPU) as HPU's "Human Capital Expert in Residence". That same month, he delivered the keynote speech at the Global Conference on Human Resources in Accra, Ghana, discussing the intersection of artificial intelligence and HR technologies. In May 2025, Taylor spoke about leadership at Oklahoma City Community College.

Taylor has testified before Congress and U.S. government agencies, covering workforce issues such as sexual harassment and paid leave. In April 2021, he testified before the Equal Employment Opportunity Commission on the civil rights implications of the COVID-19 pandemic, due to its disproportionate impact on people of color, women, and other vulnerable workers. In February 2025, he testified before the House Education and Workforce Committee on workforce development.

In July 2025, Taylor took the stage at the SHRM25 conference with former President Joe Biden to discuss his thoughts on the workplace. At the conference, Taylor urged HR professionals to lead employees through “the storm” of artificial intelligence, mass layoffs, and other economic factors.

=== Board positions ===
Taylor sits on the corporate boards of Guild Education, Flores HR, and XPO, Inc. He also serves on several nonprofit boards, including Jobs for America's Graduates. Taylor is chairman of LifeGuides’ Social Impact Council.

Taylor was previously on the boards of the United Way Worldwide, University of Miami, iCIMS, Gallup Inc., Au Bon Pain, Cooper Union, SHRM, Drake University, Blumenthal Performing Arts Center, Leader to Leader Institute (the Peter F. Drucker Foundation), YMCA of the US, and Johnson C. Smith University. He was an advisor to Safe Streets and Second Chances, a program working to reduce recidivism among previously incarcerated individuals.

Taylor has held several government-appointed positions. He was chair to President Trump's advisory board on Historically Black Colleges and Universities, and served on the White House American Workforce Policy Advisory Board, which advises the National Council for the American Worker.

In 2020, Taylor was U.S. Representative Mark Walker's guest for the State of the Union address. and in 2024, he was appointed as an official advisor and member of Nectar's advisory board. That same year, Taylor was reportedly on the Trump administration's short list for U.S. Secretary of Labor. He responded, "It would speak to the magnitude of impact SHRM has on work, workers, and workplaces globally."

In 2026, Taylor joined the board of directors of the Association to Advance Collegiate Schools of Business. He also served as Lead Independent Director at XPO Logistics and sat on the boards of Guild Education and Flores HR.

=== Articles ===
- "The digital transformation is a skills and education opportunity for all. Companies must use it." World Economic Forum (February 20, 2019)
- "Can worker get written up for changing TV to Fox News? Free-speech rights differ in office" USA Today (March 26, 2019)
- "Flexibility in the Workplace Is No Longer an Anomaly" Future of Business and Tech (December 11, 2019)
- "The Power of People You Overlook" Wiley Library (September 26, 2021)
- "How do I support employees' caregiving needs? Ask HR" USA Today (May 3, 2022)
- "How can workplace health equity lead to a fair and just society?" World Economic Forum (May 12, 2023)
- "How do I advance my career to the executive level? Ask HR" USA Today (July 2, 2024)

== Awards and recognitions ==
- In 2011, Taylor was on Ebony magazine's "Power 100" list of influential African-Americans.
- In 2019, Drake University awarded Taylor its alumni of the year award.
- In 2020, Taylor received the "Distinguished Executive of the Year" award from the Academy of Management. That same year, he was named a top 10 human resources influencer by the LaSalle Network and a King Legacy Award recipient at the 29th "International Salute to the Life and Legacy of Dr. Martin Luther King Jr." breakfast.
- In 2021, Taylor was named Professional Society CEO of the Year by CEO Update.
- In 2022, Taylor was named a "Top Voice in Company Culture" by LinkedIn.
- Taylor was recognized by Washingtonian magazine as one of Washington D.C.'s "500 Most Influential People" of 2023 and their Washington DC 500 Most Influential People Shaping Policy in 2026.
- In 2024, Taylor was named one of the "300 Most Influential Executives in Corporate America" by Savoy magazine.
- Taylor was named to Virginia Business magazine's "Virginia 500 Power List" for 2024.

== Personal life ==
Taylor married WNBA player Charlotte Smith in 2002. The marriage ended in 2007. Taylor has two children and resides in the Washington metropolitan area.
