= Society for Human Resource Management =

Professional human resources membership association

Society for Human Resource Management (SHRM)
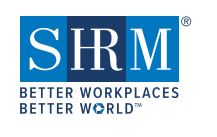
- Formation: 1948
- Founder: Leonard J. Smith
- Type: Professional association
- Legal status: 501(c)(6) nonprofit organization
- Headquarters: Alexandria, Virginia, United States
- Region served: Worldwide
- Members: 340,000
- President, Chief Executive Officer: Johnny C. Taylor Jr.
- Chair: Betty Thompson
- Subsidiaries: SHRM Foundation Inc, CEO Academy, Council for Global Immigration, HR People & Strategy Inc, SHRM Corporation, Strategic Human Resource Management India Pvt, SHRM MEA FZ-LLC, SHRM Management Consulting (Beijing) Co
- Revenue: $154,367,546 (2019)
- Expenses: $148,932,748 (2019)
- Employees: 415 (2019)
- Volunteers: 17,666 (2019)
- Website: www.shrm.org
- Formerly called: American Society for Personnel Administration

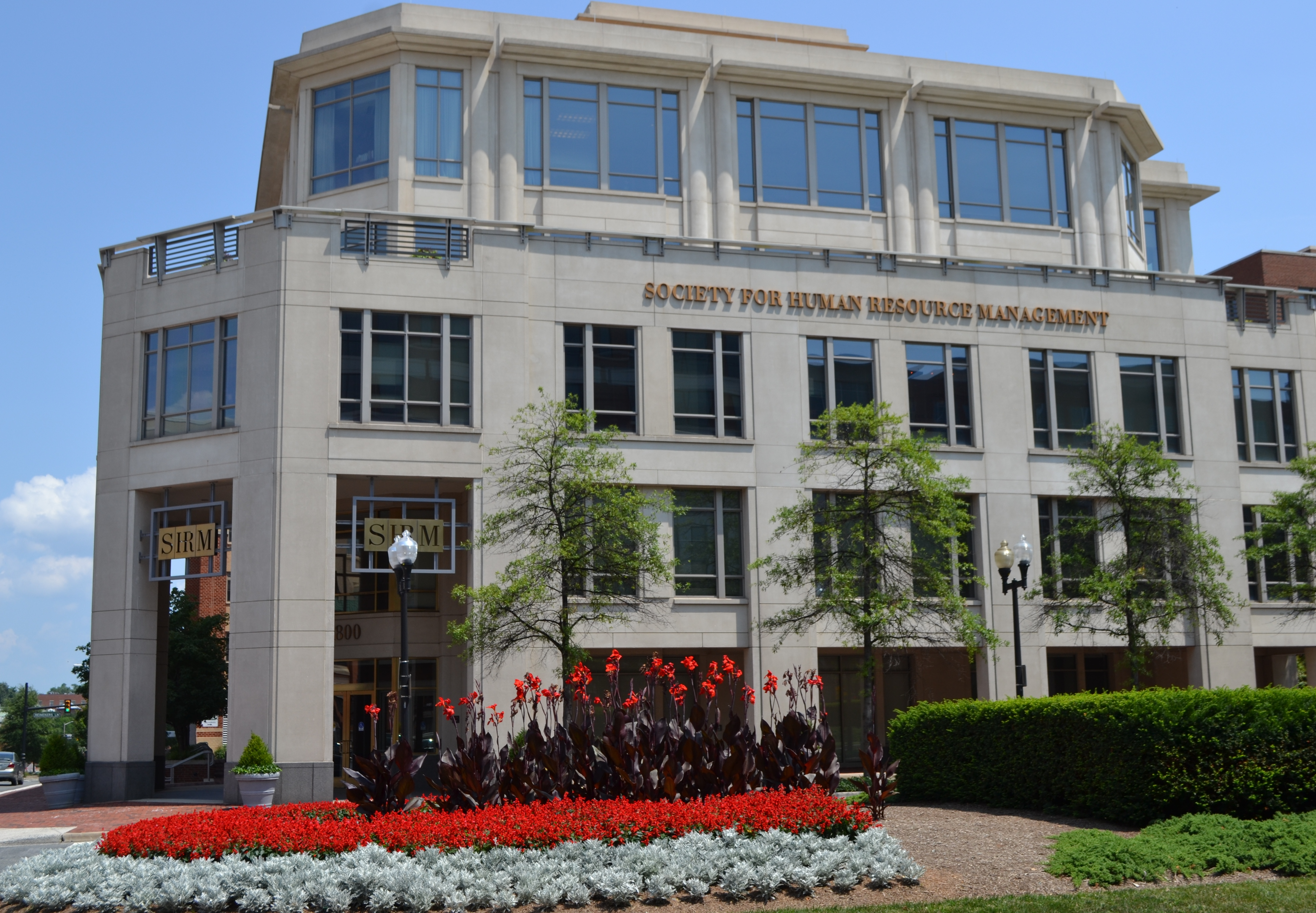
SHRM headquarters in Alexandria, VA

The Society for Human Resource Management (SHRM) is the world’s largest professional association dedicated to the practice of human resource management. Based in Alexandria, Virginia, SHRM offers membership services, conducts research, and engages in public policy advocacy related to workforce policy. A nonpartisan organization, SHRM advocates at the federal, state, and local level, aiming to influence legislation and regulations concerning workforce development, immigration, healthcare, and other issues. The organization has nearly 340,000 members in 180 countries.

== History ==
Founded in 1948 as the American Society for Personnel Administration (ASPA), the organization operated on a volunteer basis until 1964, when it established headquarters in Berea, Ohio, and began hiring staff members. In 1984, the headquarters was moved to Alexandria, Virginia, and in 1989, the organization changed its name to the Society for Human Resource Management.

SHRM has more than 575 chapters worldwide, and more than 400 employees. As of 2025, the organization has nearly 340,000 members in 180 countries.

In 2022, SHRM announced the acquisition of Linkage Inc., a U.S.-based leadership development firm. That same year, SHRM acquired CEO Academy, a learning and networking experience for CEOs that focuses on C-suite issues.

In July 2024, SHRM controversially moved away from including "equity" in what had been their "diversity, equity, and inclusion" focus. In 2025, the organization urged companies to “evaluate and elevate” their DEI initiatives, balancing diversity and inclusion with federal compliance.

In June 2025, SHRM called for companies to address the human impact related to artificial intelligence through communication, training, and other resources. Analyzing the future of work, the organization also advocates for AI-focused reskilling, but says that leadership and culture are more important predictors of workplace success than AI adoption itself.

== Leadership ==
The president and chief executive officer is Johnny C. Taylor, Jr. A longtime lawyer and human resources executive, he joined SHRM in 2017, and is credited with turning the organization around financially.

Betty Thompson, former executive vice president and Chief People Officer at Booz Allen Hamilton, is chair of SHRM’s board of directors.

== Research on workforce trends ==
SHRM's data and analytics department researches workplace issues and their implications for the HR profession and business leaders, including market research. Among its products are the annual Employee Benefits Survey, Executive Priorities and Perspectives, and Civility Index.

In 2019, SHRM released its report, "The High Cost of a Toxic Workplace Culture". The company polled American employees in order to determine the impact of culture on workers' well-being and business’ financial health. According to the report, 20% of employees left their jobs between 2014 and 2019 because of toxic workplace cultures. Partly to combat these issues, SHRM designed its People Manager Qualification learning and development program.

In 2024, SHRM research found that American workers witnessed over 171 million instances of workplace incivility on a daily basis. That same year, the organization announced the "1 Million Civil Conversations" initiative, aimed at increasing civility in U.S. workplaces.

The SHRM "State of the Workplace" and "CHRO Priorities and Perspectives" reports found that recruiting was the top priority for HR professionals in 2024. In 2025, SHRM research identified leadership and management development as the top priority. The research also highlighted employee burnout as a key challenge facing employers. Also in 2025, SHRM found that remote work drove an employment surge for workers with disabilities.

In 2026, SHRM's "State of the Workplace" report surveyed more than 1,800 HR professionals and over 2,000 workers, finding a growing chasm between supportive and unsupportive employers. Retention emerged as a concern for negatively-graded employers, with SHRM recommending increased investment in the development of leaders and managers.

In its 2026 CHRO Priorities and Perspectives report, SHRM predicted that leadership transparency and the management of multigenerational workforces would become more prevalent workplace trends. The research also found that 92 percent of CHROs expect greater AI integration in future workforce operations.

== Conferences ==
SHRM hosts regional and annual conferences. SHRM's individual state conferences are organized by the organization's state councils and chapters.

SHRM’s annual conference features HR seminars, workshops, and networking opportunities. In 2024, it was held in Chicago, Illinois. In 2025, the conference was held in San Diego, California. Former President Joe Biden was the keynote speaker in 2025, discussing the future of the American workforce. Presidents George W. Bush and Bill Clinton have also spoken at SHRM conferences.

The organization also hosts conferences like "SHRM Talent", "SHRM Blueprint", and the "SHRM Linkage Institute". The 2026 SHRM Talent conference was held in Dallas, Texas, helping managers focus on AI adoption and skills development.

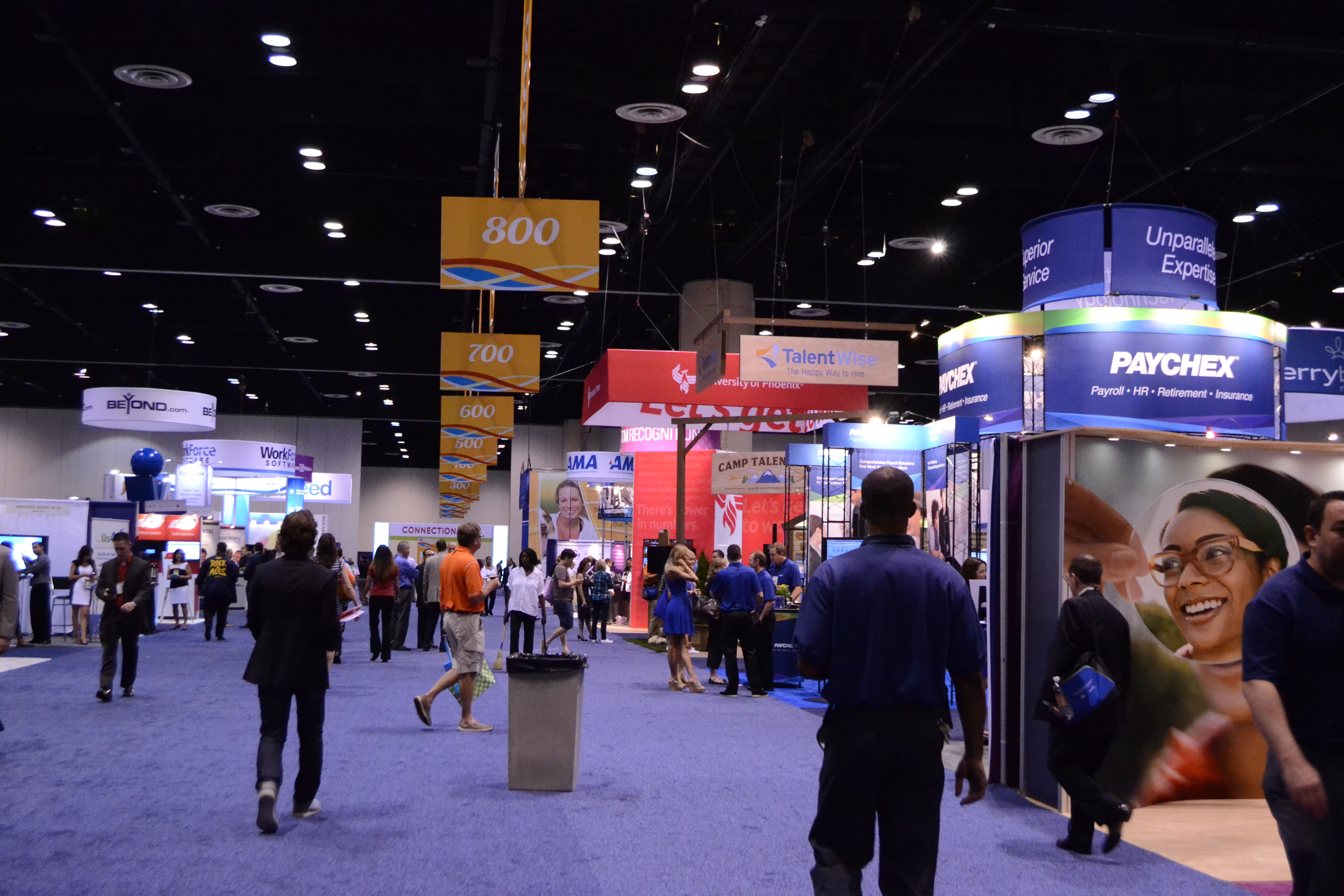
The 2014 SHRM Annual Conference & Exposition took place at Orlando's Orange County Convention Center.

== Public policy and workforce advocacy ==
SHRM lobbies governmental bodies regarding workplace law and industry practice. For example, in April 2008, SHRM announced in a press release that its representatives had appeared before the US Senate to petition for changes in the administration of the Family and Medical Leave Act.

The organization announced in the November 2003 issue of its HR Magazine that it had submitted a position paper to the Equal Employment Opportunity Commission suggesting factors the agency should consider when determining how to amend the definition of the term "job applicant" for the purposes of record keeping required by companies in order to comply with affirmative action and anti-discrimination laws.

In 2003, SHRM surveyed its members to gauge the effectiveness of the Equal Employment Opportunity Commission (EEOC). It presented the results of this survey to the EEOC at a meeting on September 8, 2003.

In 2006, the Office of Disability Employment Policy (ODEP) of the U.S. Department of Labor established an alliance with SHRM to encourage and promote the employment of people with disabilities.

In 2015 and 2016, SHRM opposed the United States Department of Labor's Fair Labor Standards Overtime regulation. The rule greatly increases the salary under which employees are eligible for overtime and the number of the employees who qualify for it.

In 2020, SHRM focused on reassuring business leaders, managers, and workers that SHRM would continue supporting employers and employees. The organization created the SHRM COVID-19 resource center to help its members navigate the pandemic.

In February 2025, Taylor testified before the House Committee on Education and Workforce, urging Congress to repair the "leaky" education-to-employment pipeline and help address the more than eight million unfilled jobs in the U.S.

== Membership and certification ==
In 2021, SHRM launched the SHRM Executive Network, a private, global collective of CHROs and HR business partners. In 2024, Fortune recognized the SHRM Executive Network as a top networking group for CHROs.

The organization also offers two main certifications: The SHRM Certified Professional Certification and the SHRM Senior Certified Professional Certification.

As of 2026, there are about 148,000 SHRM-certified professionals.

== SHRM Foundation ==
Founded in 1966, the SHRM Foundation is the philanthropic arm of SHRM. The SHRM Foundation provides HR professionals with career development programs and partnerships, among other resources. The foundation also offers merit-based Undergraduate Academic Scholarships to college students.

In June 2025, the SHRM Foundation launched the Center for a Skills First Future, a free online resource that helps employers transition to skills-based hiring and build "future-ready" teams.

== See also ==
- List of human resource management associations
