= Stephen P. Hinshaw =

American psychologist

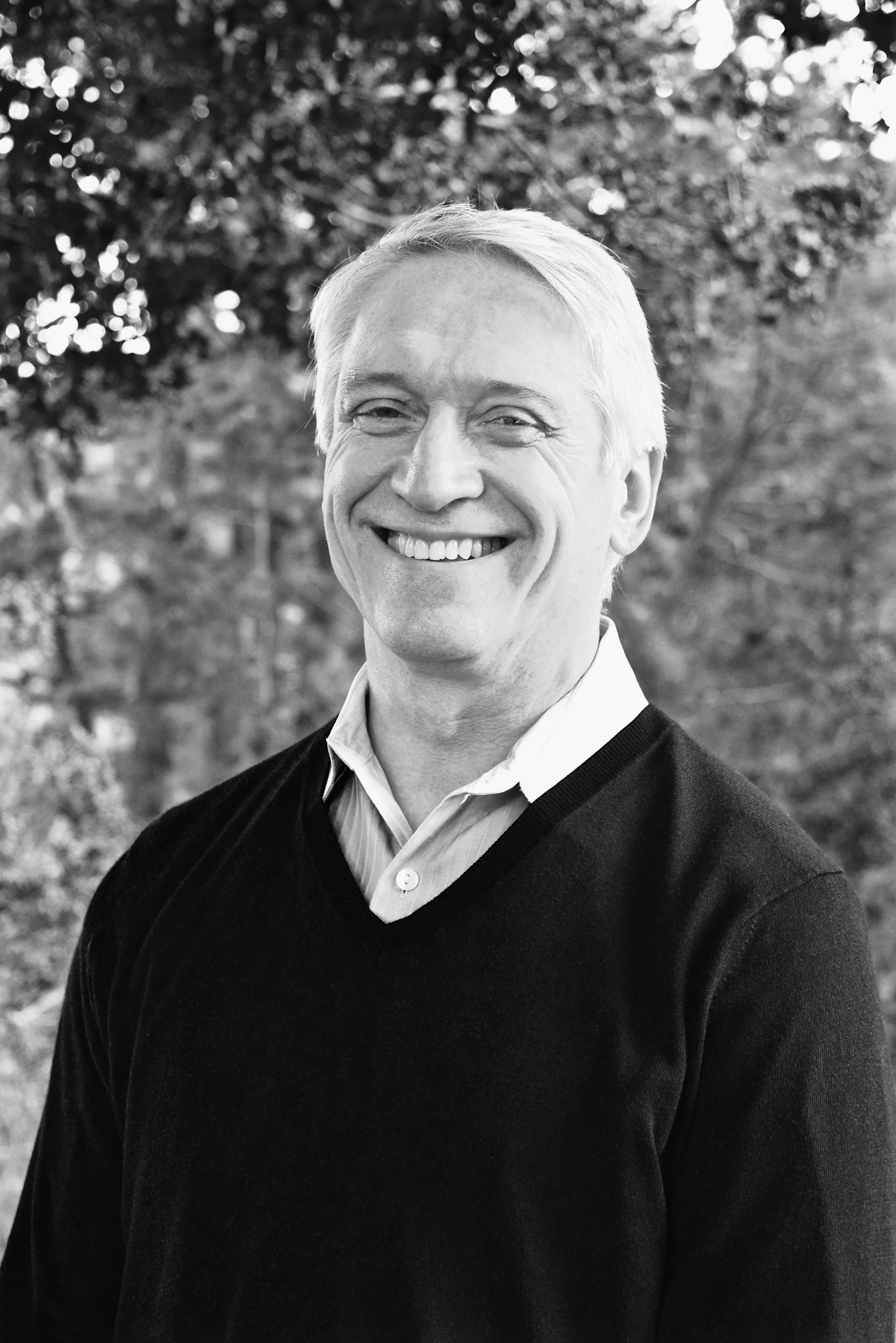
- Born: December 1, 1952 (age 73); Columbus, Ohio
- Education: Harvard University (A.B., summa cum laude, Psychology and Social Relations), University of California, Los Angeles (Ph.D., Clinical Psychology); University of California, San Francisco (post-doctoral fellowship)
- Spouse(s): Kelly Campbell, Ph.D.
- Children: Jeff Hinshaw, John Neukomm, Evan Hinshaw
- Awards: APA Award for Distinguished Scientific Contributions to Psychology
- Scientific career
- Fields: Clinical, Developmental, and Quantitative Psychology; Developmental Psychopathology
- Workplaces: University of California, Berkeley; University of California, San Francisco

External videos
- "Women and girls with ADHD", 04.17.2020, with Stephen P. Hinshaw and others,Knowable Magazine

Stephen P. Hinshaw (born December 1, 1952) is an American Distinguished Professor of Psychology at UC Berkeley—where he was Department Chair from 2004-2011—and Professor of Psychiatry & Behavioral Sciences at UC San Francisco. He focuses on neurodevelopment (especially ADHD) through longitudinal studies, clinical trials, and female presentations, as well as stigma reduction.

He has authored over 420 articles/chapters (h-index of 134) plus 11 books. His memoir, Another Kind of Madness, was awarded Best Book in Memoir/Autobiography from the American BookFest in 2018, detailing the serious, stigmatized mental illness in his father and professionally enforced family silence.

== Biography ==
Hinshaw was born on December 1, 1952, in Columbus, Ohio. He was the oldest child in the family; his sister, Sally P. Hinshaw, is 15 months younger. It wasn't until he was 18 that Hinshaw's father, the eminent philosopher Virgil Hinshaw Jr., let him in on a family secret, which had been explicitly forbidden from discussion by Virgil's doctors. Once his father's 'madness' — a lifelong, cyclic psychotic illness misdiagnosed as schizophrenia, which Hinshaw subsequently corrected as bipolar disorder — was out in the open, Hinshaw's career trajectory moved toward clinical psychology. Subsequent discussions revealed a history of involuntary hospitalizations and other brutal treatments, fueling Hinshaw's lifelong passion for understanding vulnerable children and eradicating mental illness stigma. He received his A.B. from Harvard (summa cum laude) and his Ph.D. from UCLA.

== Academic career ==
After graduating, he directed a residential summer camp for children with serious disabilities (Camp Freedom) and a day school program operating out of Massachusetts Mental Health Center (Therapeutic Center) for children who had been excluded from public school settings. He went on to earn his Ph.D. in clinical psychology at UCLA, before serving as a postdoctoral fellow at the University of California, San Francisco. He was a visiting lecturer at UC Berkeley, an assistant professor at UCLA and an assistant, associate, and currently professor at UC Berkeley and UC San Francisco.

He has served as Principal Investigator for the Berkeley site in the Multimodal Treatment Study of Children with ADHD (MTA Study) and founded the Berkeley Girls with ADHD Longitudinal Study (BGALS), the largest study of girls with this condition in existence. Contributions from the latter investigation include delineating the serious risk for self-harm (suicide attempts and non-suicidal self-injury) in girls with ADHD as they mature into late adolescence and early adulthood. Among other consultantships and affiliations, he serves on the scientific board of Glenn Close's mental health nonprofit Bring Change to Mind (BC2M), as an advisor and storyteller for the play The Manic Monologues and as co-director of the UCSF-UC Berkeley Schwab Dyslexia and Cognitive Diversity Center. He is also former co-chair of the Scientific Research Council of the Child Mind Institute.

=== Awards ===
He has received international awards in the seven areas of child development (Distinguished Scientific Contributions, Society for Research in Child Development), applied psychology (James Cattell Award, Association for Psychological Science), basic research in psychology (Distinguished Scientific Contributions, American Psychological Association), child and adolescent psychiatry (Ruane Prize, Brain & Behavior Research Foundation), international mental health (Sarnat Prize, National Academy of Medicine), international research on ADHD (Eunethydis), and outstanding career teaching/mentoring (Mentor Award, Association for Psychological Science, 2023). He was inducted into the American Academy of Arts and Sciences in 2021.

== Research ==
The primary focus of his research is externalizing behavior dimensions and disorders, particularly ADHD; family, peer, and neuropsychological risk factors; mechanisms of change via clinical trials; and the stigmatization of mental illness. His work has featured the interplay between psychobiological vulnerability, family interactions, and peer-related risk factors and impairments, emphasizing transactional models of influence. His work on randomized clinical trials of pharmacologic and psychosocial interventions for children with attention-related and impulsive behavior problems emphasizes understanding the mechanisms underlying clinically significant change, particularly family processes. He has been awarded numerous federal grants for his investigations.

Hinshaw was documented as one of the 10 most productive scholars in the field of clinical psychology across the past decade. From 2009 to 2014 he was editor of Psychological Bulletin, the most cited journal in general psychology. He is a fellow of the Association for Psychological Science, the American Psychological Association, and the American Association for the Advancement of Science. Among other accolades, his research efforts have been recognized by California's Distinguished Scientific Contribution in Psychology Award (2009), the Distinguished Scientist Award from the Society for a Science of Clinical Psychology (2015), and the James McKeen Cattell Award from the Association for Psychological Science (2016) —its highest award, for a lifetime of outstanding contributions to applied psychological research—and the Distinguished Scientific Contributions to Child Development Award (2017) from the Society for Research in Child Development.

Hinshaw's research is regularly featured in various mainstream media outlets including ABC World News Tonight, CBS Evening News, CNN, Huffington Post, NBC Today Show, New York Times, Newsweek, Oakland Tribune, Psychology Today, People Magazine, San Francisco Chronicle, The Economist, Time, Wall Street Journal, and Washington Post.

As a trainee and student, he received the R.E. Harris Award: Outstanding Clinical Psychology Fellow, Langley Porter Institute, UC San Francisco; the UCLA Alumni Association Distinguished Scholar Award winner (outstanding graduate student campus-wide); and, at Harvard, the Ames Award, Detur Prize, John Harvard Scholarship, Harvard College Scholarship, and National Merit Scholarship.

In 2001, Hinshaw received the Distinguished Teaching Award from UC Berkeley's Division of Social Sciences. His Teaching Company ('Great Lecture') series, "Origins of the Human Mind," was released in 2010.

Regarding his 2007 book, The Mark of Shame, Stigma of Mental Illness and an Agenda for Change, the New England Journal of Medicine review stated the following: "Hinshaw's skill as a writer cannot be overstated. He uses a mixture of technical and lay language to paint a picture of stigma across the ages that is thoroughly enjoyable to read despite its often distressing content. In addition to being a professor of psychology, Hinshaw comes across as a passionate historian and humanitarian." Regarding his 2014 book with Richard Scheffler, The ADHD Explosion: Myths, Medication, Money, and Today’s Push for Performance, Publishers Weekly called it "…complex, thought-provoking, and urgent."

== Bibliography ==
- Hinshaw, Stephen P.; Porter, Patricia A.; Ahmad, Shaikh I. (2024-08-27). "Developmental psychopathology turns 50: Applying core principles to longitudinal investigation of ADHD in girls and efforts to reduce stigma and discrimination". Development and Psychopathology. 36 (5): 2570–2584. doi:10.1017/s0954579424000981. ISSN 0954-5794.
- Hinshaw, Stephen P.; Nguyen, Phuc T.; O’Grady, Sinclaire M.; Rosenthal, Emily A. (2021-07-06). "Annual Research Review: Attention‐deficit/hyperactivity disorder in girls and women: underrepresentation, longitudinal processes, and key directions". Journal of Child Psychology and Psychiatry. 63 (4): 484–496. doi:10.1111/jcpp.13480. ISSN 0021-9630.
- Meza, Jocelyn I.; Owens, Elizabeth B.; Hinshaw, Stephen P. (2020-06-15). "Childhood predictors and moderators of lifetime risk of self-harm in girls with and without attention-deficit/hyperactivity disorder". Development and Psychopathology. 33 (4): 1351–1367. doi:10.1017/s0954579420000553. ISSN 0954-5794.
- Beauchaine, Theodore P.; Hinshaw, Stephen P.; Bridge, Jeffrey A. (2019-01-28). "Nonsuicidal Self-Injury and Suicidal Behaviors in Girls: The Case for Targeted Prevention in Preadolescence". Clinical Psychological Science. 7 (4): 643–667. doi:10.1177/2167702618818474. ISSN 2167-7026. PMC 6726409.
- Hinshaw, Stephen P. (2018-05-07). "Attention Deficit Hyperactivity Disorder (ADHD): Controversy, Developmental Mechanisms, and Multiple Levels of Analysis". Annual Review of Clinical Psychology. 14 (1): 291–316. doi:10.1146/annurev-clinpsy-050817-084917. ISSN 1548-5943.
- Hinshaw, S. P. (2017). Another kind of madness: A journey through the stigma and hope of mental illness. New York: St. Martin's
- Beauchaine, T. P., & Hinshaw, S. P. (Eds.) (2017). Child and adolescent psychopathology (3rd ed.). Hoboken, NJ: Wiley.
- Guendelman, M., Owens, E. B., Galan, C., Gard, A., & Hinshaw, S. P. (2016). Early adult correlates of maltreatment in girls with ADHD: Increased risk for internalizing problems and suicidality. Development and Psychopathology, 26, 1–14.
- Meza, J., Owens, E. B., & Hinshaw, S. P. (2016). Response inhibition, peer preference and victimization, and self-harm: Longitudinal associations in young adult women with and without ADHD. Journal of Abnormal Child Psychology, 44, 323–334.
- Owens, E. B., & Hinshaw, S. P. (2016). Childhood conduct problems and young adult outcomes among women with childhood ADHD. Journal of Abnormal Psychology, 125, 220-232.
- Hinshaw, S. P. (2015). Developmental psychopathology, ontogenic process models, gene-environment interplay, and brain development: An emerging synthesis. Journal of Abnormal Psychology, 124, 771-775.
- Hinshaw, S. P., & Arnold, L. E. (2015). Attention deficit hyperactivity disorder, multimodal treatment, and longitudinal outcome: Evidence, paradox, and challenge. WIRES Cognitive Science, 6, 39–52.
- Owens, E. B., Cardoos, S., & Hinshaw, S. P. (2015). Developmental progressions and gender differences among individuals with ADHD. In R. A. Barkley (Ed.), Attention deficit hyperactivity disorder: A handbook for diagnosis and treatment (4th ed.). New York: Guilford Press.
- Murman, N., Buckingham, K. C. E., Fontilea, P., Villanueva, R., Leventhal, B., & Hinshaw, S. P. (2014). Let's Erase the Stigma (LETS): A quasi-experimental evaluation of adolescent-led school groups intended to reduce mental illness stigma. Child and Youth Care Forum, 43, 631–637.
- Hinshaw, S. P., & Scheffer, R. M. (2014). The ADHD explosion: Myths, medication, money, and today's push for performance. New York: Oxford University Press.
- Swanson, E. N., Owens, E. B., & Hinshaw, S. P. (2014). Pathways to self-harmful behavior in young women with and without ADHD: A longitudinal investigation of mediating factors. Journal of Child Psychology and Psychiatry, 44, 505-515.
- Hinshaw, S. P., Owens, E. B., Zalecki, C., Huggins, S. P., Montenegro-Nevado, A., Schrodek, E., & Swanson, E. N. (2012). Prospective follow-up of girls with attention-deficit hyperactivity disorder into young adulthood: Continuing impairment includes elevated risk for suicide attempts and self-injury. Journal of Consulting and Clinical Psychology, 80, 1041-1051.
- Hinshaw, S. P., Scheffler, R. M., Fulton, B., Aase, H., Banaschewski, T., Cheng, W., Holte, A., Levy, F., Mattos, P., Sadeh, A., Sergeant, J., Taylor, E., & Weiss, M. (2011). International variation in treatment procedures for attention-deficit/hyperactivity disorder: Social context and recent trends. Psychiatric Services, 62, 459-464.
- Miller, M., & Hinshaw, S. P. (2010). Does childhood executive function predict adolescent functional outcomes in girls with ADHD? Journal of Abnormal Child Psychology, 38, 315–326.
- Hinshaw, S. P., with Kranz, R. (2009). The Triple Bind: Saving our teenage girls from today's pressures. New York: Random House/Ballantine.
- Owens, E. B., Hinshaw, S. P., Lee, S. S., & Lahey, B. B. (2009). Few girls with childhood attention-deficit/hyperactivity disorder show positive adjustment during adolescence. Journal of Clinical Child and Adolescent Psychology, 38, 1–12.
- Hinshaw, S. P., & Stier, A. (2008). Stigma in relation to mental disorders. Annual Review of Clinical Psychology, 4, 269–293.
- Mikami, A. Y., Hinshaw, S. P., Patterson, K. A., & Lee, J. C. (2008). Eating pathology among adolescent girls with attention-deficit/hyperactivity disorder. Journal of Abnormal Psychology, 117, 225–235.
- Hinshaw, S. P. (2007). The mark of shame: Stigma of mental illness and an agenda for change. New York: Oxford University Press.
- Hinshaw, S. P., Owens, E. B., Sami, N., & Fargeon, S. (2006). Prospective follow-up of girls with attention-deficit/hyperactivity disorder into adolescence: Evidence for continuing cross-domain impairment. Journal of Consulting and Clinical Psychology, 74, 489–499.
- Hinshaw, S. P. (2002). Preadolescent girls with attention-deficit/hyperactivity disorder: I. Background characteristics, comorbidity, cognitive and social functioning, and parenting practices. Journal of Consulting and Clinical Psychology, 70, 1086–1098.
- Hinshaw, S. P. (2002). Intervention research, theoretical mechanisms, and causal processes related to externalizing behavior patterns. Development and Psychopathology, 14, 789–818.
- Hinshaw, S. P., Carte, E. T., Sami, N., Treuting, J. J., & Zupan, B. A. (2002). Preadolescent girls with attention-deficit/hyperactivity disorder: II. Neuropsychological performance in relation to subtypes and individual classification. Journal of Consulting and Clinical Psychology, 70, 1099–1111.
- Hinshaw, S. P., Owens, E. B., Wells, K. C., Kraemer, H. C., Abikoff, H. B., Arnold, L. E., et al. (2000). Family processes and treatment outcome in the MTA: Negative/ineffective parenting practices in relation to multimodal treatment. Journal of Abnormal Child Psychology, 28, 555–568.
- Hinshaw, S. P., & Cicchetti, D. (2000). Stigma and mental disorder: Conceptions of illness, public attitudes, personal disclosure, and social policy. Development and Psychopathology, 12, 555–598.
- Hinshaw, S. P., & Melnick, S. (1995). Peer relationships in children with attention-deficit hyperactivity disorder with and without comorbid aggression. Development and Psychopathology, 7, 627–647.
- Hinshaw, S. P. (1992). Externalizing behavior problems and academic underachievement in childhood and adolescence: Causal relationships and underlying mechanisms. Psychological Bulletin, 111, 127–155.
- Hinshaw, S. P. (1987). On the distinction between attentional deficits/hyperactivity and conduct problems/aggression in child psychopathology. Psychological Bulletin, 101, 443‑463.
