= Mental Health Awareness Month =

American observation in May since 1949

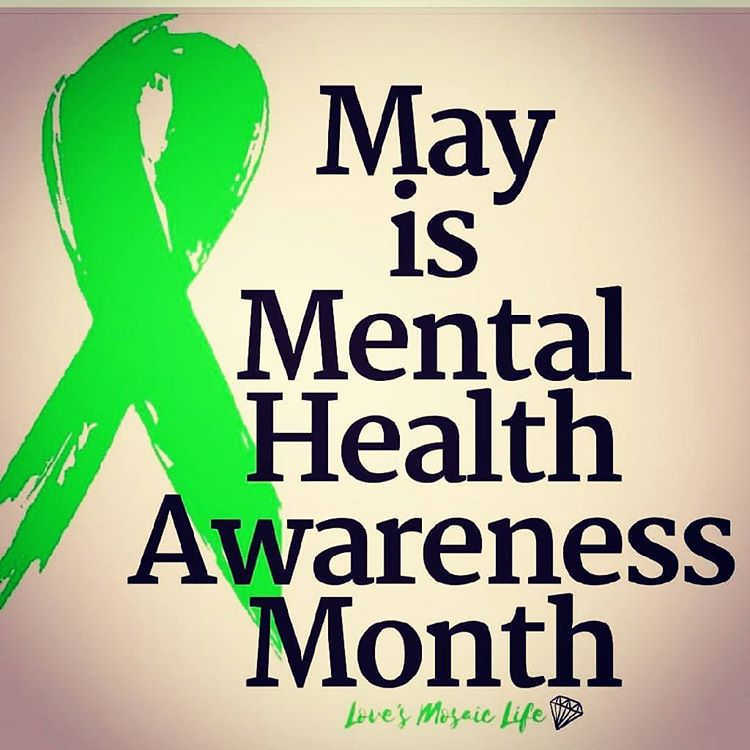
The green ribbon is the international symbol of mental health awareness.

Mental Health Awareness Month (also referred to as Mental Health Month) has been observed in May in the United States since 1949. The month is observed with media, local events, and film screenings. In the United Kingdom, Mental Health Awareness Week is a similar observation, taking place for one week during May.

== History ==
Mental Health Awareness Month began in the United States in 1949 (77 years ago) and was started by Mental Health America (MHA) (then known as the National Association for Mental Health). Each year in mid-March Mental Health America releases a toolkit of materials to guide preparation for outreach activities during Mental Health Awareness Month. During the month of May, MHA, its affiliates, and other organizations interested in mental health conduct a number of activities which are based on a different theme each year. The Mental Health Month ribbon is green, symbolizing Hope, strength, and emotional support for those affected by mental illness. The purpose of Mental Health Awareness Month is to raise awareness and educate the public about: mental illnesses, such as the 18.1% of Americans who have depression, schizophrenia, and bipolar disorder; the realities of living with these conditions; and strategies for attaining mental health and wellness. It also aims to draw attention to suicide, which can be precipitated by some mental illnesses. Additionally, Mental Health Awareness Month strives to reduce the stigma (negative attitudes and misconceptions) that surrounds mental illnesses. Mental Health Awareness Month was formalized as a month of national observance by Barack Obama in 2013.

== Themes from recent years ==
Year	Theme	Description
2025	Turn Awareness into Action	The Turn Awareness into Action theme was chosen for 2025 with the goal of celebrating “the progress we’ve made in recognizing the importance of mental health—and challenging us to turn understanding into meaningful steps toward change.”
2024	Where to Start	The Where to Start theme was chosen for 2024, with the goal "For anyone struggling with the pressure of today's world, feeling alone, or wondering if they can feel better, this is Where to Start."
2023	Look Around, Look Within	The Look Around, Look Within theme was chosen for 2023, with the goal of providing understanding "how an individual’s environment impacts their mental health, suggestions for making changes to improve and maintain mental well-being, and how to seek help for mental health challenges."
2022	Back to Basics	The Back to Basics theme was chosen for 2022, with the goal of providing "foundational knowledge about mental health [...] and information about what people can do if their mental health is a cause for concern."
2021	#Tools2Thrive	The #Tools2Thrive theme continued for 2021, "providing practical tools that everyone can use to improve their mental health and increase their resiliency regardless of their personal situation". Topics and tools covered: "Adapting after trauma and stress, Dealing with anger and frustration, Getting out of thinking traps, Processing big changes. Taking time for yourself, Radical acceptance."
2020	#Tools2Thrive	The #Tools2Thrive theme was chosen in "a time of unprecedented anxiety about a world pandemic". On May 1, Mental Health America announced the start of its May 2020 Mental Health Month campaign, with an emphasis on delivering "Tools 2 Thrive" to address the mental health needs of everyone.
2019	#4Mind4Body	The #4Mind4Body theme was chosen again and expanded on for 2019 "with a set of new resources that are best characterized as essential parts of everyone’s recovery toolkit."
2018	Fitness #4Mind4Body	The 2018 theme was Fitness #4Mind4Body. It tracks closely with the Fit for the Future theme of the June 2018 conference. During the month of May, it focused on what individuals can do to be fit for their own futures – no matter where they happen to be on personal journeys to health and wellness.
2017	Risky Business	The 2017 theme for Mental Health Month was Risky Business. It focused on the importance to educate people about habits and behaviors that increase the risk of developing or exacerbating mental illnesses, or could be signs of mental health problems themselves. These include risk factors such as risky sex, prescription drug misuse, internet addiction, excessive spending, marijuana use, and troublesome exercise patterns.
2016	Mental Illness Feels Like	The 2016 theme for Mental Health Month – Life with a Mental Illness – called on individuals to share what life with a mental illness feels like for them in words, pictures, and video by tagging their social media posts with #mentalillnessfeelslike (or submitting to MHA anonymously). The campaign was intended to encourage people to speak up about their own experiences, to share their point of view with individuals who may be struggling to explain what they are going through—and help others figure out if they too are showing signs of a mental illness.
2015	B4Stage4	The 2015 theme for Mental Health Awareness month was B4Stage4. Addressing mental health before Stage 4 calls attention to the importance addressing mental health symptoms early, identifying potential underlying diseases, and planning an appropriate course of action on a path towards overall health. One way of doing so is by taking a mental health screening – a free, confidential, anonymous questionnaire – to assess symptoms and risk factors for mental health conditions.
2014	Mind Your Health	The theme for the 2014 Mental Health Awareness month was "Mind Your Health". A focus of that year's theme was to create a motivational effort that will put toward the goal of building public recognition in regards to the importance of mental health and to the overall health and wellness of those around us. The association hopes to inform United States citizens of the connection between the mind and body; and intends to provide advice, tips and strategies that will encourage people to take positive actions and protective measures for one's own mental health, and whole-body health.
2013	Pathways to Wellness	Pathways to Wellness—the 2013 theme for Mental Health Awareness Month—called attention to strategies and approaches that help all Americans achieve wellness and good mental and overall health.
2012	Healing Trauma's Invisible Wounds	The 2012 theme – Healing Trauma's Invisible Wounds – aimed to bring to light the many sources of trauma, its profound health effects, the cost to trauma survivors and society, and new hope for healing.
2011	Do More for 1 in 4	The 2011 theme, Do More for 1 in 4, was based on a 2005 National Institute of Mental Health (NIMH) statistic indicating that as many as 1 in 4 American adults had a diagnosable mental health condition in a given year. The theme acted as a call to action for Americans to help the 1 in 4 American adults in their lives who are living with a diagnosable, treatable mental health condition, and was used to highlight treatment and recovery programs.
2010	Live Your Life Well	In 2010, the theme was Live Your Life Well. Live Your Life Well was a theme designed to encourage people to take responsibility for the prevention of mental health issues during times of personal challenge and stress. The message was to inform the public that many mental health problems could be avoided by striving toward and making positive lifestyle choices in the ways we act and think.
2009	Live Your Life Well	Live Your Life Well was a theme designed to encourage people to take responsibility for the prevention of mental health issues during times of personal challenge and stress. The message was to inform the public that many mental health problems could be avoided by striving toward and making positive lifestyle choices in the ways we act and think.
2008	Get Connected	The 2007 theme focused on an essential component of maintaining, protecting mental health, and wellness: social connectedness. Materials encouraged discussion of the many ways of creating connections that support mental health and well-being, including: family, friends and others that form an individual's social support network; the community at-large; and health care professionals, when needed. The 2008 campaign aimed to: increase recognition that mental health is fundamental to overall health and well-being; increase awareness of the role of social connectedness in promoting mental health and protecting mental health during times of adversity, particularly when one is experiencing significant life stressors; and increase recognition of the signs and symptoms of mental health conditions, with an emphasis on stress and depression, and the importance of connecting with a health care provider early.

Mental Health America is not the only organization to run campaigns throughout May. Many other similar organizations choose to host awareness observances that coincide with Mental Health Awareness month. National Children's Mental Health Awareness Day is one such campaign. This event is sponsored by the Substance Abuse and Mental Health Services Administration in partnership with other non-profit and advocacy organizations.

Other months and weeks throughout the year are designated to raise awareness around specific mental health conditions or the mental health of different demographic groups (Minority Mental Health Month, Mental Illness Awareness Week, National Depression Screening Day, etc.).

== See also ==
- National Child Traumatic Stress Network (NCTSN)
- Mental Illness Awareness Week (USA, first week of October)
- Mental Health Week, in Australia
- World Mental Health Day (October 10)
