= Richard Scheffler =

American health economist (born 1943)

Richard M. Scheffler
- Born: July 11, 1943 (age 83); Brooklyn, New York
- Spouse(s): Lynn Paringer (m. 1980, div. 1998); Margaret Kellogg (m. 2018)
- Children: Zachary Scheffler, William Kellogg Catterton (Stepson)
- Awards: UC Berkeley Emeriti Association “Emeriti of the Year” Award (2024); Berkeley Citation (2018); Gold Medal from Charles University (2015); Fulbright Scholar at Pontificia Catolica University of Chile (2012-2013); Chair of Excellence in Economics, Carlos III University (2013); Carl A. Taube Award (2004); Fulbright Scholar at Charles University (1993)

Academic background
- Education: New York University (PhD, Economics)

Academic work
- Discipline: Health Economics, Public Policy

Richard Michael Scheffler (born July 11, 1943) is an American health economist whose career has focused on applying health economics to public policy both nationally and globally. He is a Distinguished Professor of Health Economics and Public Policy at the University of California, Berkeley (UC Berkeley) in the Graduate School of Public Health and the Goldman School of Public Policy. He is the Founding Director of the campus-affiliated, research-driven Nicholas C. Petris Center on Health Care Markets and Consumer Welfare.

== Early life and education ==
Scheffler was born on July 11, 1943, and grew up in Brooklyn, New York, with three younger sisters. He attended P.S. 202 Ernest S. Jenkyns from kindergarten to 8th grade. With an early interest in mathematics and engineering, he attended Brooklyn Technical High School, a magnet school. He earned a BS in economics from Hofstra University in 1965, an MA in economics from Brooklyn College in 1967, and a PhD in economics with Honors from New York University in 1971.

== Academic career ==
After completing his PhD, Scheffler took his first academic position in the economics department at the University of North Carolina, Chapel Hill. He was also a visiting professor at Duke University in the Department of Economics and Institute of Policy Sciences and Public Affairs. He left after four years to serve as a Scholar in Residence for the National Academy of Sciences in Washington, D.C., where he focused on applying health economics to federal health policy issues. He then taught in the economics department at George Washington University.

In 1981, Scheffler accepted a one-year visiting job at UC Berkeley which transitioned to associate professor in the Department of Social and Administrative Health Services within the School of Public Health with tenure. He went on to become a Distinguished Professor of Health Economics and Public Policy, with joint tenured appointments in the School of Public Health and Goldman School of Public Policy.

He founded the Joint Masters of Public Health and Masters of Public Policy Program at UC Berkeley in 1986. Two years later, he founded the PhD program in Health Services and Policy Analysis. This program has been ranked number two in the nation by the National Research Council. Scheffler has served twice as Program Chair and was elected as Faculty Chair for the School of Public Health in 2012 to represent faculty in academic matters. From 1993 to 2003, he served as Program Director of the Scholars in Health Policy Research PhD program at UC Berkeley and University of California, San Francisco.

While his professional home remained at Berkeley, Scheffler's work took him abroad. He was a Visiting Scholar at the World Bank in 2003. He was also a visiting professor at the London School of Economics, the University of Pompeu Fabra (in Barcelona), the Pontifical Catholic University of Chile, and Charles III University of Madrid. Scheffler was a Fulbright Scholar at Charles University in Prague, Czech Republic in 1993 and at Pontificia Universidad Católica de Chile in Santiago, Chile in 2012–2013. He was granted the Chair of Excellence Award at the Carlos III University of Madrid in 2013. In 2015, he received the Gold Medal from Charles University in Prague for his longstanding and continued support of international scientific and educational collaboration.

Scheffler received a $2 million award from the Attorney General of California to establish the Nicholas C. Petris Center on Health Care Markets and Consumer Welfare. The health economics center, affiliated with UC Berkeley, conducts empirical research on healthcare markets, accessibility, quality, and affordability, especially for low-income populations. In 1999, as the Endowed Chair in Health Care Markets and Consumer Welfare, Scheffler officially opened the doors to the Petris Center.

Scheffler retired from teaching in 2018, but as an Emeritus Professor he remains the Director of the Petris Center. He continues to lead research projects on private equity, public options, and market competition with the goal of influencing public policy. As an honor, the faculty established the Richard Scheffler Health Economics Award to be given annually to the student with the most outstanding Berkeley PhD dissertation in health economics.

== Contributions and Publications ==
Scheffler has written and edited twelve books while publishing over 300 papers. He was the sole editor of World Scientific Series in Global Health Economics and Public Policy: Volume 3 and the first of three editors of World Scientific Series in Global Health Economics and Public Policy: Volume 7. In 2025, he wrote the Foreword for The Glory of Giving Everything, a one-of-a-kind book about Taylor Swift's business model by Crystal Haryanto, which showcases how artistic success can be subjected to underlying economic principles. With over 10,000 Google Scholar citations and a Google h-index of 53, his work falls into four broad categories.

=== Health Workforce ===
One of Scheffler's subfields of interest is workforce policy. In 2003, he was elected President of the International Health Economics Association (IHEA), which consists of over 2000 members from more than 60 countries, and chaired the IHEA meeting in San Francisco. Scheffler's research has centered on the financing of health systems by various countries and most recently, on workforce shortages particularly in Africa, the United States, and other OECD countries. Utilizing economic models, he has estimated the shortages and surpluses of physicians and nurses not only in the United States but also worldwide. Additionally, his work has highlighted the importance of primary care, nurse practitioners, and physician assistants. He was one of the first economists to consider the effects of utilizing physician assistants in the delivery of healthcare in the United States.

Scheffler has advised a number of countries on workforce policy in regions including Peru, Chile, and Brazil as well as being a visiting scholar at the Rockefeller Foundation in Bellagio, Italy, where he wrote his critically acclaimed book Is There a Doctor in the House? Market Signals and Tomorrow's Supply of Doctors released in 2008 with Stanford University Press. Through his lens of economics and policy, he examined the components that influence the future supply of doctors across specializations and geographic regions. He then proposed a method to improve efficiency and address the doctor shortage. Scheffler also co-authored The Labor Market for Health Workers in Africa regarding the health system in Africa and launched it at the World Bank in DC.

A followup analysis appeared in "Projecting Shortages and Surpluses of Doctors and Nurses in the OECD: What Looms Ahead" published in 2018 in Health Economics, Policy and Law. Scheffler demonstrated that without intervention, imbalances between supply and demand of doctors and nurses would surface. A shortage of nearly 400,000 doctors across 32 OECD countries and nearly 2.5 million nurses across 23 OECD countries in the year 2030 were projected.

"Forecasting imbalances in the global health labor market and devising policy responses" appeared in Human Resources for Health in the same year and applied economic models to the global shortage of health workers. For high- and middle-income countries, a shortage will arise due to demand exceeding supply. For low-income countries, the shortage will exist for both supply and demand; demand is low because these countries lack the economic means to sustainably employ health workers.

=== Mental Health ===
Scheffler was recognized with the Carl A. Taube Award by the American Public Health Association in 2004 for his work on mental health economics. His work described the organization and financing of mental health as well as its impact on the cost, quality, and accessibility of mental health services.

Scheffler authored a book published in 2014 by Oxford Press with psychologist Stephen P. Hinshaw at Berkeley. The ADHD Explosion: Myths, Medication, Money, and Today's Push for Performance changed the way people think about the growth and treatment of attention-deficit/hyperactivity disorder. Highly cited and reviewed, it was called "…complex, thought-provoking, and urgent" by Publishers Weekly.

He also wrote papers on the impact and growth of medication used to treat ADHD in the United States and globally. In "Positive association between initial ADHD medication use and academic achievement during elementary school" published in Pediatrics in 2009, Scheffler and his co-authors found that medicated ADHD children scored higher on math and reading. Scheffler and Hinshaw teamed up once more, along with co-authors, to map out care and treatment for ADHD in "International variation in treatment procedures for ADHD: social context and recent trends," which appeared in Psychiatric Services in 2011.

=== Social Capital and Health ===
Scheffler has worked extensively in the areas of social capital and health. He, along with co-authors, laid out the definitions, research overview, and implications of social capital in 2008 Health Economics, Policy, and Law article "Social capital, economics, and health: new evidence" and 2014 Eastern Economic Journal publication "Social Capital and Health: A Concept whose Time has Come."

Mental health and social capital interacted in a 2007 Social Science & Medicine paper, "The role of social capital in reducing non-specific psychological distress: the importance of controlling for omitted variable bias." Scheffler and co-authors discovered a negative association between social capital and psychological distress in those with a below-median income. The study emphasized a need for controlling for non-time-varying omitted variables, as the association was much stronger after that was done. In "The empirical relationship between community social capital and the demand for cigarettes" that appeared in 2006 in Health Economics, Scheffler and co-authors found that smokers smoked fewer cigarettes when subjected to higher social capital from religious groups, but the prevalence of smoking overall in the community is not affected by that.

Scheffler has also co-authored the writing of World Scientific Series in Global Health Economics and Public Policy: Volume 2 with Chapter 6: Measures of Social Capital, published in Singapore. He wrote the foreword and edited the book. He has studied social capital in Indonesia and identified its positive association with good health in "Social capital and health in Indonesia," which appeared in World Development in 2006. His similar finding in Argentina is described in "Social capital and self-rated health in Argentina," published in Health Economics in 2012.

A highlight of his written work was his work for the Organisation for Economic Co-operation and Development to produce a report entitled "Social Capital, Human Capital, and Health: What is the Evidence?" that reviewed social capital and its relationship to physical well-being, psychological health, and education, both at an individual and communal level.

Lastly, Scheffler has given numerous talks on this topic. He launched a series on social capital and health with the goal of improving research on it internationally, with the first meeting in 2006 and biennial workshops hosted at various universities afterwards. Notable seminars of the series include "Social Capital Global Network" in the Institute for Research and Information in Health Economics in Paris in 2008 and "Social Capital and Healthy Aging" at the Canadian Centre for Health Economics in Toronto in 2014. In 2016, he led a public lecture called "The relationship between social capital and health: What mechanisms and empirical evidence" at the University of Oxford as a feature of his Astor Visiting Lectureship.

=== Competition in Healthcare Markets ===
Scheffler has established the empirical link between healthcare mergers and acquisitions and the prices of healthcare services. His 2017 Health Affairs article, "Insurer Market Power Lowers Prices in Numerous Concentrated Provider Markets," discussed the correlation between market concentration and provider prices. In moderately concentrated markets, hospital admission prices and cardiologist, radiologist, and hematologist/oncologist visit prices were lower than in non-concentrated markets due to insurers' bargaining power. However, such price reductions do not translate to lower premiums for consumers. On the consumer side, Scheffler analyzes the effect of higher vertical integration to be a 12 percent rise in marketplace premiums, a 9 percent rise in specialist prices, and a 5 percent rise in primary care prices. This work, "Consolidation Trends In California’s Health Care System: Impacts On ACA Premiums And Outpatient Visit Prices," appeared in Health Affairs in 2018.

A collaboration with the American Antitrust Institute, a nonprofit dedicated to competition regulation and consumer protection, produced a report in 2021 entitled "Soaring Private Equity Investment in the Healthcare Sector: Consolidation Accelerated, Competition Undermined, and Patients at Risk." The report spotlighted evidence of the negative impact of private equity in the healthcare industry. It was cited in the May 19, 2021 hearing of the United States Senate Committee on the Judiciary's Subcommittee on Competition Policy, Antitrust, and Consumer Rights.

Most recently, Scheffler has partnered with Stephen Shortell, Dean Emeritus of the UC Berkeley's School of Public Health, to spearhead research regarding a potential public option insurance plan for California. This culminated in a report, "Golden Choice: California's Public Option" released in 2022, that exhibited how a public option would lower healthcare costs while maintaining quality for state residents. An analysis on LA Care, which acts like a county-based public option, and its impact on premiums in the LA Region, strengthened the argument for such a plan. Scheffler, Shortell, and their research team presented their findings in Sacramento with state legislators, stakeholders, and press, as well as invoked a discussion panel moderated by Deputy Cabinet Secretary Richard Figueroa.

== Additional Accomplishments ==
For Scheffler's academic achievements and services to the campus, he was awarded the Berkeley Citation in 2018, one of the highest honors given by the campus. Presented on behalf of the Chancellor, it is awarded to individuals whose contributions and achievements exceed the standards of excellence in their fields.

In 2019, Governor Gavin Newsom appointed Scheffler to the Healthy California For All Commission, which was tasked with developing a plan to guide California towards universal coverage. That same year, Scheffler was elected as an expert to the National Academy of Social Insurance.

In 2024, Scheffler was elected to the rank of American Association for the Advancement of Science Lifetime Fellow to honor his distinguished contributions to the fields of health and mental health economics, competition in health care, and the development and implementation of domestic and global public health policy. Scheffler also earned the UC Berkeley Emeriti Association’s “Emeriti of the Year” Award for continuing to achieve influence in his field after retiring from teaching.

In 2025, Scheffler was featured by UC Berkeley Public Health in a series on outstanding emeritus faculty for his "profound impact on public health."
