= The Vagina Monologues =

1996 play by Eve Ensler

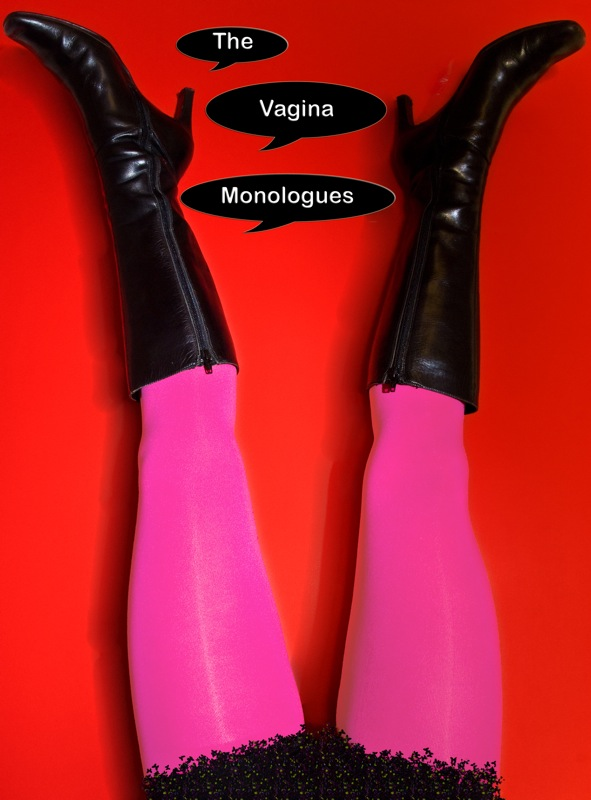
- The Vagina Monologues poster
- Original language: English
- Written by: V

Premiere
- Date: 1996
- Place: HERE Arts Center, New York City, US

The Vagina Monologues is an episodic play written in 1996 by V (formerly known as Eve Ensler) which developed and premiered at HERE Arts Center, an off-off-Broadway venue in New York, and was followed by an off-Broadway run at the Westside Theatre. The play explores consensual and nonconsensual sexual experiences, body image, genital mutilation, direct and indirect encounters with sexual reproduction, vaginal care, menstruation, prostitution, and several other topics through the eyes of women with various ages, races, sexualities, and other differences.

Charles Isherwood of The New York Times called the play "probably the most important piece of political theater of the last decade."

In 2018, The New York Times stated "No recent hour of theater has had a greater impact worldwide" in an article titled "The Great Work Continues: The 25 Best American Plays Since 'Angels in America'".

V originally starred in both the HERE premiere and in the first off-Broadway production, which was produced by David Stone, Nina Essman, Dan Markley, The Araca Group, Willa Shalit and the West Side Theater. When she left the play, it was recast with three celebrity monologists. The play has been staged internationally, and a television version featuring V, was produced by cable TV channel HBO. In 1998, V and others, including Willa Shalit, a producer of the Westside Theatre production, launched V-Day, a global non-profit movement that has raised over US$100 million for groups working to end violence against women (including those who hold fluid identities that are subject to gender-based violence), through benefits of The Vagina Monologues.

In 2011, V was awarded the Isabelle Stevenson Award at the 65th Tony Awards, which recognizes an individual from the theater community who has made a substantial contribution of volunteered time and effort on behalf of humanitarian, social service, or charitable organizations for her creation of the V-Day movement.

== History ==
V wrote the first draft of the monologues in 1996 (there have been several revisions since) following interviews she conducted with 200 women about their views on sex, relationships, and violence against women. The interviews began as casual conversations with her friends, who then brought up anecdotes they themselves had been told by other friends; this began a continuing chain of referrals. In an interview with Women.com, V said that her fascination with vaginas began because of "growing up in a violent society". "Women's empowerment is deeply connected to their sexuality." She also stated, "I'm obsessed with women being violated and raped, and with incest. All of these things are deeply connected to our vaginas."

V wrote the piece to "celebrate the vagina". V states that in 1998, the purpose of the piece changed from a celebration of vaginas and femininity to a movement to stop violence against women. This was the start of the V-Day movement which has continued strong every year since, has turned into a worldwide phenomenon, and a very successful non-profit organization.

The play opened at HERE Arts Center in New York City on 3 October 1996, with a limited run that was scheduled to end November 15 but was extended to December 31. The play gained popularity through sold-out performances, media coverage and word of mouth. "In 2001, V-Day sold out New York's Madison Square Garden with more than seventy actors performing. The evening raised $1 million for groups working to end violence against women and girls."

"After 'The Vagina Monologues' debuted in 1996, it quickly became a hit. Soon, V's episodic play had graduated from off-off Broadway to Madison Square Garden to college stages the world over."

In 2004, an all-transgender performance of The Vagina Monologues was held for the first time. The performance was covered by the 2006 documentary Beautiful Daughters, which displays the hardships the all-transgender cast faced with the production.

The play was also adapted into a Marathi play called Yonichya Maneechya Gujagoshti by feminist writer-activist Vandana Khare in the year 2009.

Gabriela Youth, a national democratic mass organization for young women in the Philippines, also adapted the play into a Tagalog theatrical show called Ang Usapang Puke with student members from the Polytechnic University of the Philippines in the year 2018.

== Plot summary ==
The Vagina Monologues is made up of personal monologues read by a diverse group of women. Originally, V performed every monologue herself, with subsequent performances featuring three actors, and more recent versions featuring a different actor for every role. Each of the monologues deals with an aspect of the feminine experience, touching on matters such as sex, sex work, body image, love, rape, menstruation, female genital mutilation, masturbation, birth, orgasm, the common names for the vagina or simply as a physical aspect of the body. A recurring theme throughout the piece is the vagina as a tool of female empowerment, and the ultimate embodiment of individuality.

Some monologues include:

- I Was Twelve, My Mother Slapped Me: a chorus describing many young women's and girls' first menstrual period.
- Hair, a piece in which a woman discusses how her husband had cheated on her because she had refused to shave her pubic hair, ultimately allowing her to see that it should not matter whether or not she chooses to shave, and that "hair is there for a reason".
- My Angry Vagina, in which a woman humorously rants about injustices wrought against the vagina, such as tampons, douches, and the tools used by OB/GYNs.
- My Vagina Was My Village, a monologue compiled from the testimonies of Bosnian women subjected to rape camps.
- The Little Coochie Snorcher That Could, in which a woman recalls memories of traumatic sexual experiences in her childhood and a self-described "positive healing" sexual experience in her adolescent years with an older woman. This particular skit has sparked outrage, numerous controversies and criticisms due to its content, among which the most famous is the Robert Swope controversy (see below). In the original version she is 13, but later versions changed her age to 16. It also originally included the line, "If it was rape, it was a good rape", which was removed from later versions.
- Reclaiming Cunt, a piece narrated by a woman who illustrates that the word "cunt" itself is an empowering word when reclaimed, despite its history of disconcerting connotations.
- The Woman Who Loved to Make Vaginas Happy, in which a sex worker for women discusses the intriguing details of her career and her love of giving women pleasure. In several performances it often comes at the end of the play, literally climaxing with a vocal demonstration of a "triple orgasm".
- Because He Liked to Look At It, in which a woman describes how she had thought her vagina was ugly and had been embarrassed to even think about it, but changed her mind because of a sexual experience with a man named Bob who liked to spend hours looking at it.
- I Was There in the Room, a monologue in which Eve Ensler describes the birth of her granddaughter in graphic detail and positive wonder.

Every year a new monologue is added to highlight another issue affecting women around the world. In 2003, for example, V wrote a new monologue, called Under the Burqa, about the plight of women in Afghanistan under Taliban rule. In 2004, V wrote one called They Beat the Girl Out of My Boy. . .Or So They Tried after interviewing a group of trans women. Every V-Day thousands of local benefit productions are staged to raise funds for local groups, shelters, and crisis centers working to end violence against women.

== V-Day ==
V-Day logo

V-Day is a non-profit 501(c)(3) organization that distributes funds to national and international grassroot organizations and programs that work to stop violence against girls and women. The Vagina Monologues is the cornerstone of the V-Day movement, whose participants stage benefit performances of the show and/or host other related events in their communities. Such events take place worldwide each year between 1 February and 30 April, many on college campuses as well. All performances must stick to the annual script that V-Day puts out specifically for the V-Day productions of The Vagina Monologues. The V-Day organization encourages the renditions to include as many diverse actors as possible. With a minimum of 5 actors required by V-Day, the organization also has no maximum limit on the number of actors that can be included in the productions and encourages inclusion of as many actors as possible. The performances generally benefit rape crisis centers and shelters for women, as well as similar resource centers for women and girls experiencing violence against them.

On 21 February 2004, V in conjunction with Jane Fonda and Deep Stealth Productions produced and directed the first all-transgender performance of The Vagina Monologues, with readings by eighteen notable transgender women and including a new monologue documenting the experiences of transgender women. It debuted in connection with "LA V-DAY Until the Violence Stops" with monologues documenting the violence against transgender women. Since that debut, many university and college productions have included these three "Transgender Monologues". Beautiful Daughters (2006) is a documentary about the cast of the first performance by transgender women.

== Support ==
An article in Signs by Christine M. Cooper begins by applauding The Vagina Monologues for benefit performances done within the first six years (1998–2004). These performances raised over $20 million, 85 percent of which was donated to grassroots organizations that fight against violence towards women.

== Criticism ==
=== Criticism from feminists ===
The Vagina Monologues has been criticized by some within the feminist movement, including pro-sex feminists and individualist feminists. Sex-positive feminist Betty Dodson, author of several books about female sexuality, saw the play as having a narrow and restrictive view of sexuality. Dodson's main concern seemed to be the lack of the term "clitoris" throughout the play. She believes that the play sends a message that the vagina is the main sex organ, not the clitoris. There is also criticism of The Vagina Monologues about its conflation of vaginas with women, more specifically for the message of the play that women are their vaginas, as Susan E. Bell and Susan M. Reverby argue, "Generations of feminists have argued that we are more than our bodies, more than a vagina or 'the sex'. Yet, TVM re-inscribes women's politics in our bodies, indeed in our vaginas alone." The focus on women finding themselves through their vaginas, many say, seems more like a Second Wave consciousness-raising group rather than a ground-breaking, inter-sectional, Third Wave cornerstone.

=== Criticism for being anti-transgender ===
Because of the title and content of The Vagina Monologues being body-centric, American University chose to change their production of it to a new show including all-original pieces, giving the production the name of Breaking Ground Monologues. Although members of American University's Women's Initiative believe that the show was revolutionary in the 1990s, they concluded that equating having a vagina with being a woman is not an accurate display of womanhood in the 2010s, suggesting that The Vagina Monologues continues to perpetuate the gender binary and erase the identity of those who are genderqueer.

In 2015 a student organization at Mount Holyoke College canceled its annual performance of the play for being, in its opinion, insufficiently inclusive of transgender people. "At its core", Erin Murphy, the president of the school's theater group, said, "the show offers an extremely narrow perspective on what it means to be a woman. … Gender is a wide and varied experience, one that cannot simply be reduced to biological or anatomical distinctions, and many of us who have participated in the show have grown increasingly uncomfortable presenting material that is inherently reductionist and exclusive." The college had begun admitting trans women the previous year, but denied that had anything to do with the decision to discontinue the annual performances of the play.

=== Criticism for being colonial ===
Kim Hall, a professor of philosophy at Appalachian State University, further criticizes the play, particularly the sections dealing with women in developing countries, for contributing to "colonialist conceptions of non-Western women", such as the piece "My Vagina Was My Village." Although she supports frank discussions about sex, Hall rescales many of the same critiques leveled by feminists of color at "White privilege" among second-wave feminists: "premature white feminist assumptions and celebrations of a global 'sisterhood.'"

In The Vagina Monologues, depictions of sexual violence are told through mostly non-white and non-US centered stories, as Srimati Basu states, "While a few of these forms of violence, such as sexual assault and denigration of genitalia, are depicted in U.S. locations, violence is the primary register through which 'the global' is evoked, the main lens for looking outside the United States. These global locations serve to signify the terror that is used to hold the laughter in balance, to validate the seriousness of the enterprise, while the 'vagina' pieces are more directly associated with pleasure and sexuality and set in the United States."

In 2013, Columbia University's V-Day decided to stage the play with a cast entirely of non-White women. That decision, too, was controversial.

=== Social conservative criticism ===
The play has also been criticized by social conservatives, such as the American Society for the Defense of Tradition, Family and Property (TFP) and the Network of Enlightened Women. The TFP denounced it as "a piece replete with sexual encounters, lust, graphic descriptions of masturbation and lesbian behavior", urging students and parents to protest. Following TFP and other protests, performances were cancelled at sixteen Catholic colleges. Saint Louis University made the decision not to endorse the 2007 production, claiming the yearly event was getting to be "redundant". The response of the university's student-led feminist organization was to continue the production at an off-campus location.

=== Robert Swope ('good rape') critique ===
In 2000, Robert Swope, a conservative contributor to a Georgetown University newspaper, The Hoya, wrote an article critical of the play. He suggested there was a contradiction between the promotion of rape awareness on V-Day and the monologue "The Little Coochie Snorcher That Could", in which an adult woman recalls that being given alcohol and statutorily raped at 13 by a 24-year-old woman was a positive, healing experience, ending the segment with the proclamation "It was a good rape."

Outcry from the play's supporters resulted in Swope being fired from the staff of The Hoya, before the piece was even run. Swope had previously criticized the play in an article he wrote entitled "Georgetown Women's Center: Indispensable Asset or Improper Expenditure?" His termination received critical editorial coverage in The Wall Street Journal, Salon, National Review, The Atlantic Monthly, The Washington Times, The Weekly Standard, and by Wendy McElroy of iFeminists.

The controversy resulted in the script being modified in 2008 to change the age of the statutorily raped girl from 13 to 16 and to remove the "good rape" line.

== College performances ==
Every year, the play is performed on hundreds of college campuses as part of V-Day's College campaign.

Inspired by The Vagina Monologues, many colleges have gone on to develop their own plays. Performances at colleges are always different, not always pre-written, and sometimes feature actors writing their own monologue. The Vagina Monologues also served as inspiration for Yoni Ki Baat, the "South Asian adaptation of The Vagina Monologues", and as loose inspiration for The Manic Monologues, "the mental-illness version of The Vagina Monologues."

The Cardinal Newman Society has criticized the performance of the play on Catholic college campuses. In 2011 ten of the fourteen Catholic universities hosting the Monologues were Jesuit institutions. The Jesuit Tim Clancy, pastor and philosophy professor at Gonzaga University, explains why he supports VM performances on campus: "They are not arguments – they are stories … stories of pain and suffering, stories of shame, violation and impotence" that lead to discussions on "the extremes of the human condition", responding to the call of Pope Benedict for Jesuits in their work to explore "the boundaries resulting from an erroneous or superficial vision of God and man that stand between faith and human knowledge".

== See also ==
- Yoni Ki Baat
- The Indiscreet Jewels
- The Manic Monologues
