= Mental Health Week (Australia) =

Australian awareness week

Mental Health Week is an awareness week in Australia. It was first held in 1985 and is now an annual event. It is held in October, including 10 October, which is World Mental Health Day.

The Australian Broadcasting Corporation holds "Mental As", when it broadcasts various stories related to mental health issues during Mental Health Week.

== See also ==
- Mental Health Awareness Month, in the United States
