= Beautiful Daughters =

2006 American film directed by Josh Aronson

- Directed by: Josh Aronson
- Country of origin: United States
- Original language: English

Production
- Producer: Josh Aronson
- Editor: Kate Hirson
- Running time: 46 minutes

Original release
- Release: February 11, 2006

Beautiful Daughters is a 2006 documentary that follows the first-ever all-transgender production of V's play The Vagina Monologues. It was released in the United States on February 11, 2006. The documentary is directed by Josh Aronson and Ariel Orr Jordan and features Calpernia Addams, Jane Fonda, and Andrea James.

== About ==
During the planning of this performance, V wrote a new monologue using narratives from the transgender cast called They Beat the Girl Out of My Boy. . . Or So They Tried. It promotes visibility of trans women, regardless of their anatomy.

The documentary displays the hardships the all-transgender cast had to endure in order to make the production relevant to their identity. A few women involved in the production used their rendition of The Vagina Monologues as a platform to "come out", having been closeted as transgender beforehand.
