= Christopher Zara =

American writer (born 1970)

- Born: Christopher Zara; November 3, 1970 (age 56); Trenton, New Jersey, U.S.
- Occupations: Author, Journalist

Christopher Zara (born November 3, 1970, in Trenton, New Jersey) is an American writer. He is the author of Tortured Artists: From Picasso and Monroe to Warhol and Winehouse, The Twisted Secrets of the World's Creative Minds. Zara covers media, technology, and culture for Fast Company magazine in New York City. He was previously employed at International Business Times, Newsweek, and as managing editor of Show Business, and has written for Vice News, Condé Nast Traveler, and Emmy Magazine. The Los Angeles Times described Tortured Artists as "the funniest book to come out of New York in 2012." The Miami Herald called it "madly clever and cleverly mad." Critic and psychiatrist Jacob Appel heaped praise on the volume in a 2012 review, describing the book as "a surprisingly sophisticated and oddly brilliant work—part popular science and part cultural criticism—that blends comic observation and trenchant insight into a literary treasure as difficult to put down as it is to classify."

== Biography ==
Zara was born in Trenton, New Jersey, and attended school in Trenton and adjacent Hamilton Township. In his memoir, Uneducated, he describes himself as a poor student with behavioral problems, and writes that he was classified with an emotional disturbance by the school system. Zara was kicked out of high school in 11th grade and later obtained a GED. As a teenager in the 1980s, he spent time hanging out at the noted Trenton punk rock club City Gardens.

Zara entered professional journalism through an unpaid internship in New York City at Show Business Weekly, later becoming the newspaper's managing editor. He made the jump to digital media as an editor for International Business Times, an online news startup, and was working there when the company purchased Newsweek in 2013. He joined Fast Company in 2016 and is the business publication's senior editor of news. Zara has been an advocate for skills-based hiring and advancing workers without college degrees.

== Criticism ==
Zara's theory that pain is a requirement for creating great art has been criticized by some arts institutions. Criticizing Zara on the Americans for the Arts blog, Victoria Ford said that it was "naïve" to believe that great artists "rested on their plights," and that vulnerability and courage, not pain, were requirements for great art. The University of Cambridge's Cambridge Student newspaper called Zara's theory "absurd." Zara has countered his critics by saying that people can be unsettled by the idea that being happy and being a great artist are mutually exclusive.

In a 2014 interview with Ireland's Newstalk radio, Zara further attempted to clarify the controversy. It's possible to create art from joy, he said, but it's art created from adversity that is most often the art worth paying attention to:

"You can have that impulse to create whether you've been through a tragedy or not, obviously. But to me, it's like, if you don't struggle to create your art in some way, why do I care about it? ... To me, it's like, 'Tell me something. Tell me about your struggle. Tell me about pain. Tell me about life.' I mean, that's what life is."

== Other work ==
Zara previously worked as a screenwriter with his brother Fred Zara for Sketchbook Productions. His credits include Average Community (2009), which won the Audience Award for Best Feature Documentary from the 2009 CMJ Film Festival.
