= RushmoreDrive =

Search engine

Company logo

RushmoreDrive was the first search engine aimed for the Black community, launched in April 2008 and dissolved in 2009. It was co-founded by Johnny C. Taylor, Jr., Kevin McFall, and Brad Gebert It delivered a blend of mainstream search results plus a layer of more relevant search results influenced by the Black community.

RushmoreDrive News was a tool that attempted to help the Black community find news headlines from the World Wide Web, including well known Black media, blogs and countless relevant on-line voices, as well as recognized mainstream news sources.
