= Yoni Ki Baat =

Live monologue performance project

- Company: South Asian Sisters
- Date of premiere: 2003
- Location: San Francisco Bay Area

Yoni Ki Baat (roughly translated from Hindi as "Conversations about the Vagina", and sometimes abbreviated YKB) is a project featuring the live performance of monologues by women of South Asian origin, loosely inspired by V's The Vagina Monologues. Pieces can be performed by the writer, or by another performer, sometimes anonymously. Since its launch, YKB has been continuously performed across the United States.

== Founding and themes ==
Yoni Ki Baat was developed in 2003 by South Asian Sisters, a non-profit collective of South Asian women based in the San Francisco Bay Area. The co-founders, Maulie Dass, Sapna Shahani and Vandana Makker, sent out a call in February 2003, and described receiving an outpouring of submissions. The first public performances in July 2003 at UC Berkeley included monologues dealing with abuse, menstruation, masturbation, orgasms, marriage, religion and political protest.

According to Makker:

Yoni Ki Baat allows individuals who identify as women of South Asian ancestry the space to share their stories around issues that are often 'taboo' (and therefore not discussed) in our communities. Stories around sex, body image, abuse, violence. Stories around sex, body image, abuse, violence, pleasure, hair, relationships, bodily functions, strong emotions—pleasure, hair, relationships, bodily functions, strong emotions—those things we often can't even admit to ourselves. These are the stories that we seek out and then perform on stage. Sometimes the writers perform their own pieces and sometimes we have other women perform them. In the spirit of The Vagina Monologues, a portion of the proceeds from each show are donated to organizations that support survivors of domestic violence.

== Performances ==
Yoni Ki Baat performances and spinoffs have been performed in various parts of the United States by campus organizations and local South Asian organizations, sometimes borrowing scripts from South Asian Sisters, holding calls for submissions, or a combination of the two. The majority of proceeds are donated to organizations supporting survivors of domestic violence in the South Asian community.

In addition to South Asian Sisters' regular performances in the San Francisco Bay Area, YKB has been staged in New York City, Los Angeles, Seattle, Chicago, Madison, Cambridge, Ann Arbor, Worcester, Grinnell, Palo Alto and Boston.

== Book ==
The first anthology of YKB pieces, Yoni ki Baat, was published in 2024.
