= Mental Illness Awareness Week =

Awareness week in the United States

Mental Illness Awareness Week (MIAW) was established in the U.S. in 1990 recognition of efforts by the National Alliance on Mental Illness (NAMI) to educate and increase awareness about mental illness. It takes place every year during the first full week of October. During this week, mental health advocates and organizations across the U.S. join to sponsor events to promote community outreach and public education concerning mental illnesses such as major depressive disorder, bipolar disorder, and schizophrenia. Examples of activities held during the week include art/music events, educational sessions provided by healthcare professionals and individuals with lived experience and/or familial lived experience, advertising campaigns, health fairs, prayer services, movie nights, candlelight vigils, and benefit runs.

As of 2017, over 46 million (almost 1 out of 5) U.S. adults live with a mental illness. 4.5% of U.S. adults (over 11 million) have a Serious Mental Illness (SMI). The numbers may be larger because stigma reduces reporting. 45 percent of these adults meet criteria for two or more disorders. These range from fairly common mood disorders to the much more serious anxiety and schizophrenia disorders. Among these, anxiety disorders were the most common, as some 40 million American adults ages 18 and older experience some form of anxiety disorder. Despite the large number of Americans affected by such disorders, stigma surrounding mental illness is a major barrier that prevents people from seeking the mental health treatment that they need. Programs during Mental Illness Awareness Week are designed to create community awareness and discussion in an effort to put an end to stigma and advocate for treatment and recovery.

MIAW coincides with similar organization campaigns in early October such as World Mental Health Day (World Federation for Mental Health), National Depression Screening Day (Screening for Mental Health), and National Day Without Stigma (Active Minds).

== See also ==
- Mental Health Awareness Month (US, May)
- World Mental Health Day (October 10)
