= Skills-based hiring =

Employers setting specific skill, competency requirements or targets

Skills-based hiring refers to the practice of employers setting specific skill or competency requirements or targets. Skills and competencies may be cognitive (such as mathematics or reading) or other professional skills, often commonly called "soft" skills (such as "drive for results" or customer service).

== Purpose ==
The intent of skills-based hiring is for applicants to demonstrate, independent of an academic degree the skills required to be successful on the job. It is also a mechanism by which employers may clearly and publicly advertise the expectations for the job – for example indicating they are looking for a particular set of skills at an appropriately communicated level of proficiency. The result of matching the specific skill requirements of a particular job to with the skills an individual has is both more efficient for the employer to identify qualified candidates, as well as provides an alternative, more precise method for candidates to communicate their knowledge, skills, abilities and behaviors to the employer.

== Process ==
In skills-based hiring, the applicant is tested by a third party and presents the scores to the employer as part of the application process. In this sense, skills-based hiring is similar to the U.S. practice of individuals taking third party (e.g., SAT or ACT) tests, and then using those scores as part of a college application. Skills-based hiring is distinct from pre-employment testing, in that it is not the employer who issues the test or controls who sees the scores.

The specific skills needed for a job, and their corresponding levels, are established by the employer through job profiling. Thus, skills-based hiring requires not only that suitable tests be available for applicants, but also that employers have a legally compliant process for defining the levels and set of skills required for each distinct job title for which they wish to hire.

== Advantages ==
Advocates of skills-based hiring claim it has the following beneficial effects for employers:

- Turnover: 25-70% reductions in employee turnover, often to levels of 4% or less, due to a more exact match of applicant to position.
- Training: 25-75% reductions in employee training time, training cost, and/or time-to-full-productivity
- Hiring: 70-80% reductions in cost-to-hire; 50%-70% reductions in time-to-hire
- Productivity: “Significant,” though usually unspecified, increases in total employee productivity
- Universality: The same skills-qualification methodology can be used for all jobs within the same company, from entry-level through upper management. This is because skills tests are designed to assess across a far larger range of ability than typical academic, placement, or certification exams.
- Ability to locate applicants (by skill scores) for “hard-to-fill” jobs requiring unique skill combinations or jobs for which there is no formal degree program
- Shifting of the testing burden from the employer (typical in pre-employment testing) to the applicant (typical in skills testing)

And the following beneficial effects for applicants:

- Ability to retest at any time means applicants can always get up-to-date “credit” for any skill improvements their lives bring as a result of more education, informal learning, work experience, military service, etc.
- Ability to obtain jobs without a degree or with the “wrong degree,” if skills are a match
- Greater lateral job mobility, as the same skills signature can qualify an individual for multiple jobs that have different titles but require fundamentally similar skills.
- Clearer articulation of career ladders: each job in a job hierarchy will typically have its skills signature published, thereby allowing company employees to unambiguously determine the requisite “skill-up” to get the next job
- Availability of inexpensive, online curricula to improve skills and thus scores. Thus an individual can prepare for higher level job opportunities without having to re-enter formal education for extended periods of time.

== Disadvantages ==
The disadvantages of skills-based hiring cited are, for the employer:

- Expense, particularly of job profiling (typically $3–$5K and 1-2 hours of in-house visitation by the profiler)
- Relatively little case law establishing hard boundaries for the approach. Managers seeking approval to utilize skills-based hiring will often encounter extended delays from in-house legal counsel because the latter have no clear body of case law on which to base recommendations.
- Often, a clear mismatch between the skills established as “necessary” by the profile (e.g., Observation) and what is taught in local school systems. This in turn often causes employers to be embroiled in curriculum redesign discussions.

And for the applicant:

- Testing time – 5-20 minutes for each job-related test, typically followed by upload of CV in PDF-format.
- Additional personality testing and interview(s) required

== Etymology ==
While the practice of skills-based hiring had existed for 20 years, the term itself originated in 2012 with the work of the Kellogg Foundation-funded New Options project in New Mexico. New Options developed the term in an attempt to distinguish between private employability testing and the rarer practice of having an employer set specific, independently verified, and publicly articulated goals for the skill expectations of job applicants. The public nature of the communication, usually in the form of want ads containing specific numeric skill scores, was intended to allow both school systems and individuals to more readily measure themselves against, and strive to meet, employer expectations.

== Pilot projects ==
The City of Albuquerque launched a pilot program with the nonprofit Innovate+Educate focused around skills-based hiring in 2013.

The private company Zyncd launched a pilot program called IM-Exchange with the UK Government's Transport Systems Catapult, which is testing professionals' skills in question-and-answer format, using the crowd to verify their skills.
