= World Mental Health Day =

International observance, 10 October

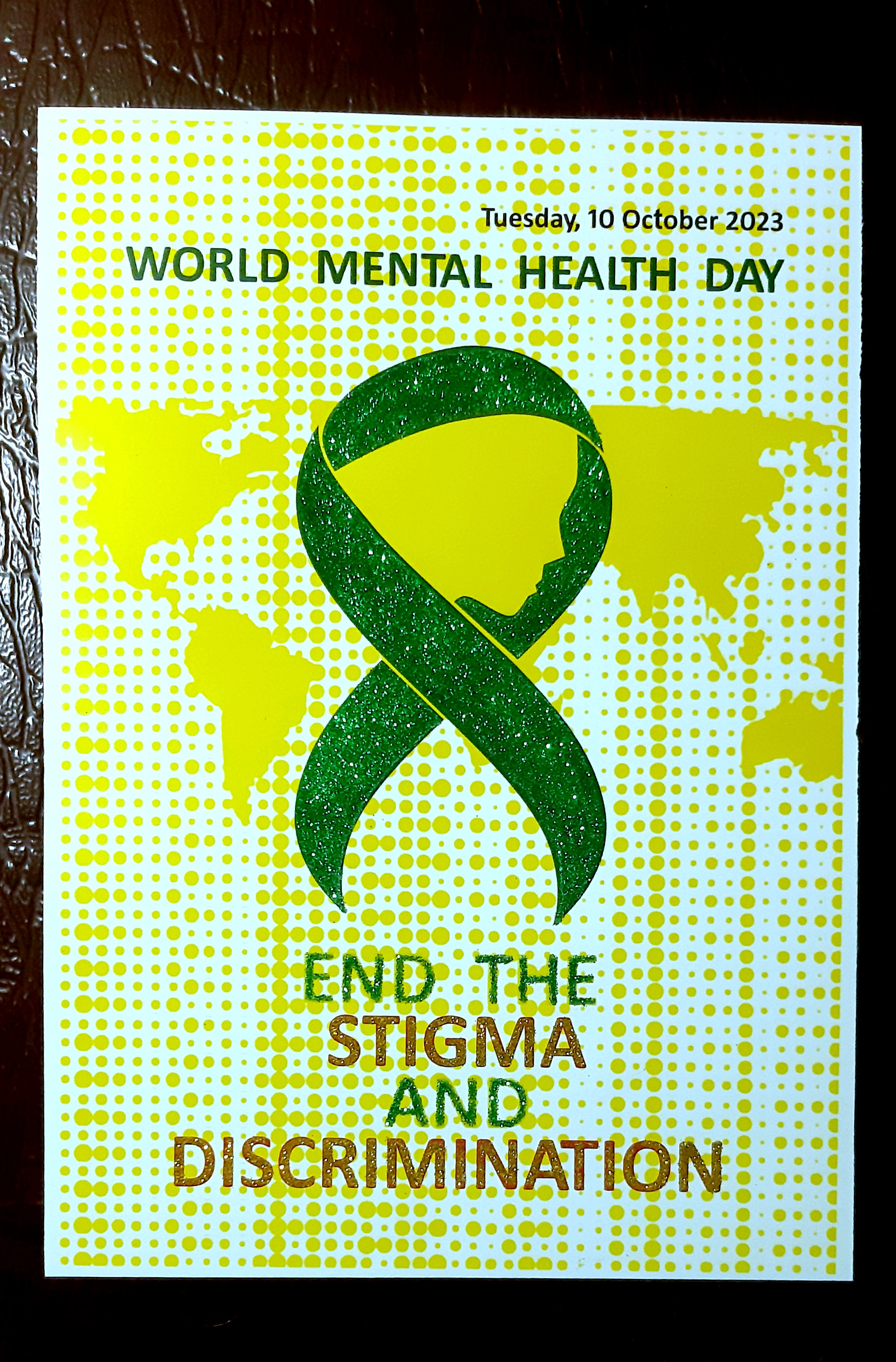
- A poster for the 2023 World Mental Health Day featuring a green ribbon to symbolise mental health awareness
- Observed by: World Federation for Mental Health, World Health Organization, and member organizations of WFMH
- Date: 10 October
- Next time: 10 October 2026
- Frequency: annual

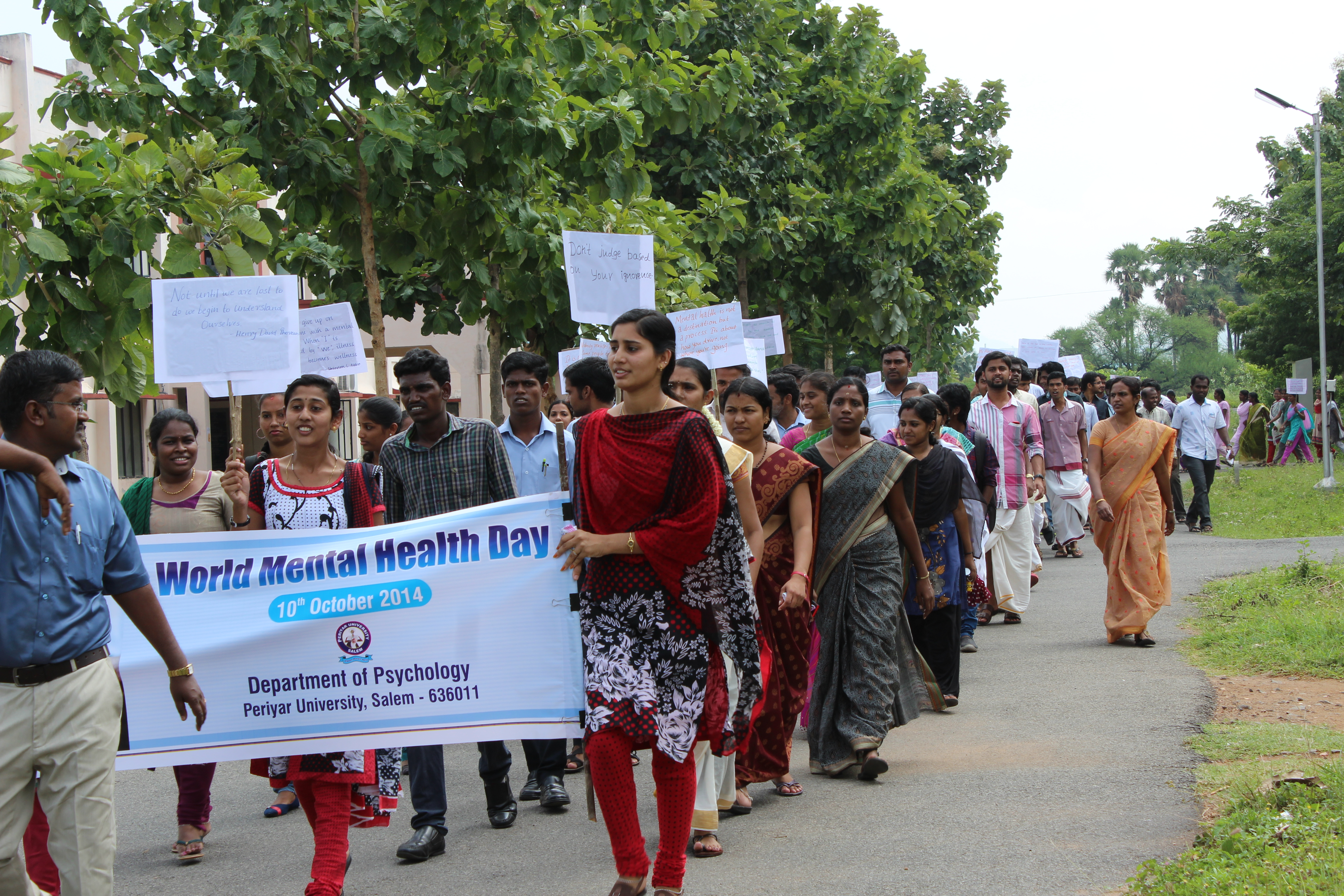
A rally for World Mental Health Day 2014 in Salem, Tamil Nadu, India

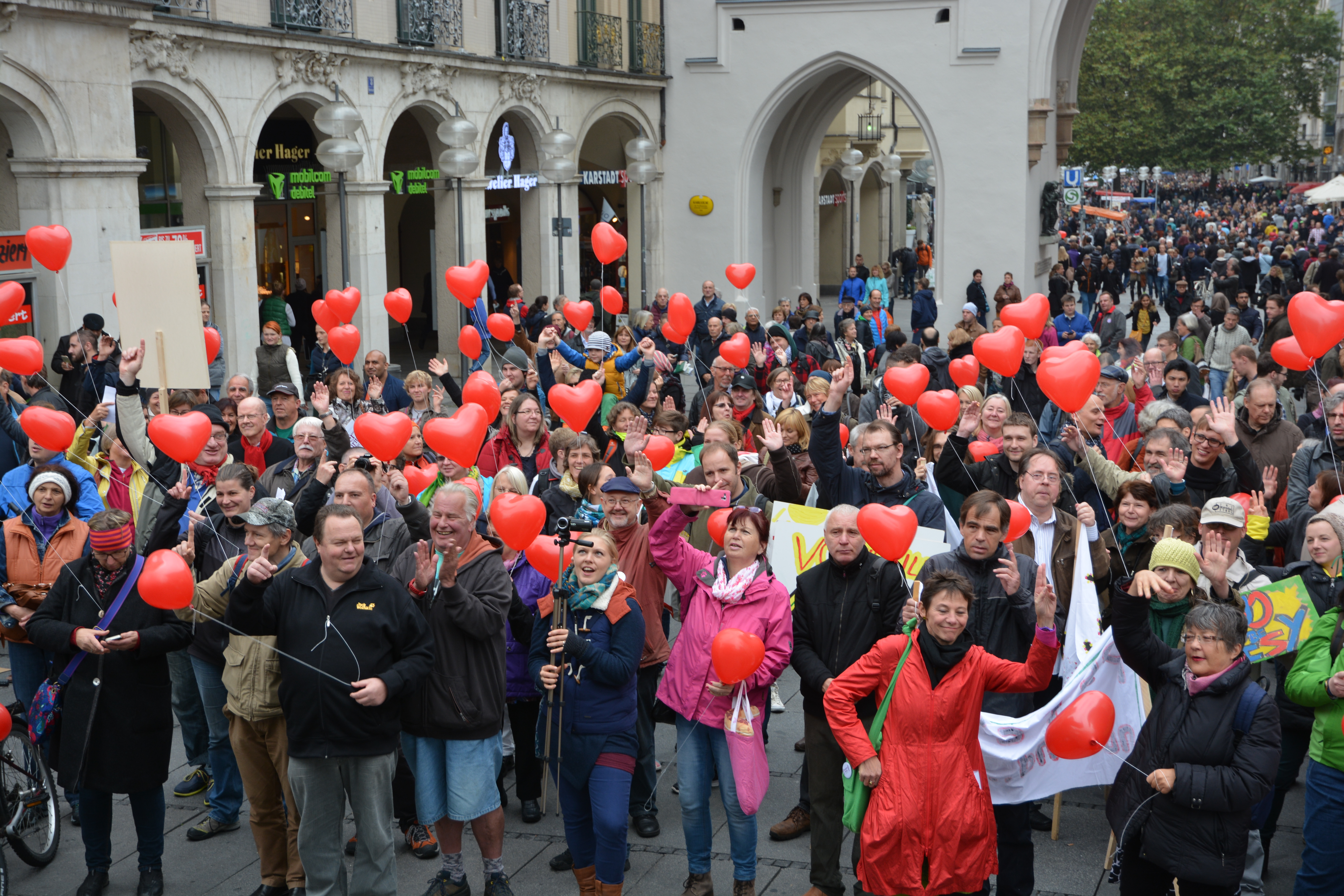
World Mental Health Day 2015 in Munich, Germany

World Mental Health Day (10 October) is an international day for global mental health education, awareness and advocacy against social stigma. It was first celebrated in 1992 at the initiative of the World Federation for Mental Health, a global mental health organization with members and contacts in more than 150 countries. On this day, thousands of supporters come to celebrate this annual awareness program to bring attention to mental illness and its major effects on people's lives worldwide. In addition, this day provides an opportunity for mental health professionals to discuss and shed light on their work, making mental health a priority worldwide. In some countries this day is part of an awareness week, such as Mental Health Week in Australia.

== History ==
World Mental Health Day was celebrated for the first time on October 10, 1992, at the initiative of Deputy Secretary General Richard Hunter. Up until 1994, the day had no specific theme other than general promoting mental health advocacy and educating the public.

In 1994 World Mental Health Day was celebrated with a theme for the first time at the suggestion of then Secretary General Eugene Brody. The theme was "Improving the Quality of Mental Health Services throughout the World".

World Mental Health Day is supported by the WHO through raising awareness on mental health issues using its strong relationships with the Ministries of health and civil society organizations across the globe. The WHO also supports with developing technical and communication material.

On World Mental Health Day 2018, Prime Minister Theresa May appointed Jackie Doyle-Price as the UK's first suicide prevention minister. This occurred while the UK government hosted the first ever global mental health summit.

== World Mental Health Day themes ==
| Year | Theme |
|---|---|
| 1994 | Improving the Quality of Mental Health Services throughout the World |
| 1996 | Women and Mental Health |
| 1997 | Children and Mental Health |
| 1998 | Mental Health and Human Rights |
| 1999 | Mental Health and Aging |
| 2000–01 | Mental Health and Work |
| 2002 | The Effects of Trauma and Violence on Children & Adolescents |
| 2003 | Emotional and Behavioural Disorders of Children & Adolescents |
| 2004 | The Relationship Between Physical & Mental Health: co-occurring disorders |
| 2005 | Mental and Physical Health Across the Life Span |
| 2006 | Building Awareness – Reducing Risk: Mental Illness & Suicide |
| 2007 | Mental Health in A Changing World: The Impact of Culture and Diversity |
| 2008 | Making Mental Health a Global Priority: Scaling up Services through Citizen Advocacy and Action |
| 2009 | Mental Health in Primary Care: Enhancing Treatment and Promoting Mental Health |
| 2010 | Mental Health and Chronic Physical Illnesses |
| 2011 | The Great Push: Investing in Mental Health |
| 2012 | Depression: A Global Crisis |
| 2013 | Mental health and older adults |
| 2014 | Living with Schizophrenia |
| 2015 | Dignity in Mental Health |
| 2016 | Psychological First Aid |
| 2017 | Mental health in the workplace |
| 2018 | Young people and mental health in a changing world |
| 2019 | Mental Health Promotion and Suicide Prevention |
| 2020 | Move for mental health: Increased investment in mental health |
| 2021 | Mental Health in an Unequal World |
| 2022 | Make Mental Health & Well-Being for All a Global Priority |
| 2023 | Mental Health is a universal human right |
| 2024 | It is time to Prioritize Mental Health in the Workplace |
| 2025 | Access to Services – Mental Health in Catastrophes and Emergencies |
| 2026 | Lived experiences heard: real voices, real change |

== See also ==
- Global Mental Health
- Mental Illness Awareness Week (US, first week of October)
- National Alliance on Mental Illness (NAMI)
- National Institute of Mental Health (NIMH)
- World Health Day
- World Federation for Mental Health
