= The Air Force School =

Coordinates: 28.5863°N 77.1539°E

The Air Force School (TAFS)
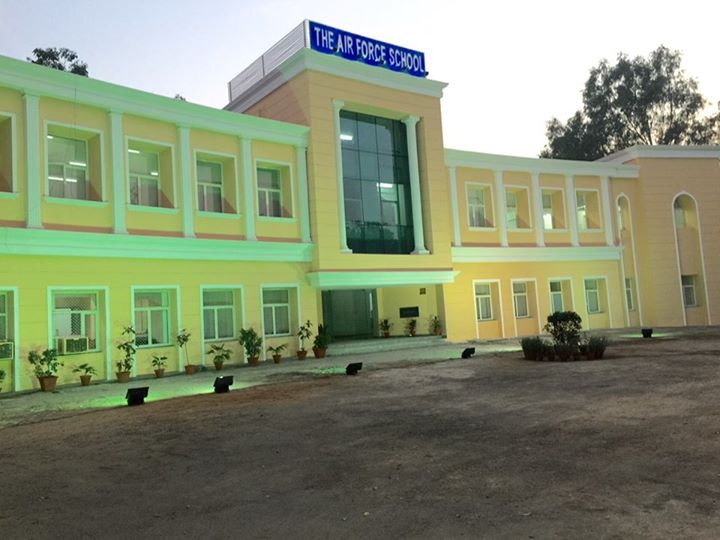
- The Air Force School, Subroto Park
- Subroto Park; Delhi Cantt, New Delhi, 110010; India

Information
- Motto: Education Empowers
- Established: 1955
- School board: CBSE
- Principal: Lomina Rajiv
- Classes: UKG - 12
- Campus size: 72600 square yards (15 acres)
- Campus type: Urban
- Website: www.tafssp.com

The Air Force School (TAFS), formerly known as Air Force Central School (AFCS), is a high school in Delhi, India. It was founded in 1955 by Chief of Air Staff Subroto Mukherjee. The school was established in temporary wartime barracks at Wellingdon Camp, on 18 July 1955 to educate children of the Indian Air Force personnel. In May 1967, the school moved to its Aravalli Campus location on the Aravalli ridge in Subroto Park, Delhi Cantonment. The school celebrated its Silver Jubilee in 1980, and dropped the word "Central" from its name.

The school, and its sister schools, Air Force Bal Bharati School and the Air Force Golden Jubilee Institute are presently run by the Indian Air Force Educational and Cultural Society.

== Management ==
The Managing Committee of the school is headed by the Joint Director of Education of the Directorate of Education, Air Headquarters (R.K. Puram) New Delhi. The Committee consists of some officers of the Indian Air Force and two elected representatives of the teaching staff; one elected representative of the parents, two nominated members each of the Directorate of Education, Delhi Administration and of the Education Advisory Board, Delhi Administration. The Board of Governors, presided over by the Air Officer in charge of Administration, Air Headquarters is the body for all the schools run by the IAF Education Society. The Vice Principal looks after the academics, assisted by the Headmistress of the Junior Wing and the Head of the Department of each faculty. The Administrative Officer cum Bursar and the Accountant, look after the accounts, administration and management.

== Affiliations ==
The Air Force School is a co-educational public school. The school is affiliated to the Central Board of Secondary Education and students are prepared for the All India Secondary School Examination (Class X) and the All India Senior School Certificate Examination (Class XII). The School is a member of the Indian Public Schools' Conference (IPSC) and also of National Progressive Schools' Conference (NPSC).

== Notable alumni ==
- Anoop Malhotra (Lt. General, Indian Army)
- Cyrus Addie Pithawalla (Maj. General, Indian Army), (Recipient of Ashok Chakra)
- Ashok Malhotra (Professor, University of British Columbia)
- Diptendu Choudhury (Air Marshal, Indian Air Force)
- Nikesh Arora (CEO, Palo Alto Networks, previously, President & COO of SoftBank Corp and SVP and Chief Business Officer, Google)
- Pawanexh Kohli (CEO, National Centre for Cold-chain Development cum Chief Advisor, Department of Agriculture & Farmers Welfare, GOI)
- Rakesh Sharma (film director, made Final Solution in 2003)
- Rini Simon Khanna (News Anchor)
- Vijay Shankar (Retd.) (Vice Admiral, Indian Navy)
- Mohana Singh Jitarwal (One of the first female fighter pilots of India.)
- Kavery Nambisan (Surgeon and writer)
- Subrahmanyam Jaishankar (Minister of External Affairs)
- Parvez Dewan (Indian Administrative Service J&K Cadre. Secretary, India Tourism)
- Kabir Sadanand (Movie Director and Producer)
- Ramon Chibb (Filmmaker)
- Mohammad Jawed (Member of Parliament, Kishanganj)
- Kabir Khan (film director)
- Aparna Sharma (model, actress)

== Programmes ==
The school offers four main streams - Humanities, Commerce, Science (Medical) and Science (Non-medical). Besides English and Physical Education, subjects offered are:

- Humanities: Mathematics, Applied Mathematics, Economics, History, Geography, Political Science, Psychology, Home Science, Informatics Practices.
- Commerce: Accountancy, Business Studies, Economics, Mathematics, Applied Mathematics, Geography, Home Science, Informatics Practices.
- Science (Medical): Mathematics, Applied Mathematics, Physics, Chemistry, Biology, Home Science, Psychology, Informatics Practices.
- Science (Non-medical): Mathematics, Physics, Chemistry, Computer Science, Economics.

The school site, known as Aravali campus, is situated at the Aravali Ridge. The 100 yards campus includes instructional blocks, laboratories and an SUPW activities complex; a music division, staff quarters and a boarding house. The school sickbay functions under the supervision of a Resident Medical Officer and a Resident Medical Assistant. The medical staff, besides providing medical assistance to the students, conduct annual medical check ups.

The school conducts classes in activities under Socially Useful Productive Work (SUPW) : music - instrumental and vocal, dance, painting, sculpture, wood work, electronics and journalism. The school has societies and clubs with a teacher in-charge for each. These include Wild Life and Nature Club, Photography, Science, and Music. In the Home Science department boys are trained in household activities and House Maintenance, Home Economics and Nutrition.

Adjoining the school campus there are play fields for hockey, cricket, and football, and a 400-meter track. The Sports Authority of India has started coaching in football, hockey, and basketball for students. Students take part in mountaineering, rock climbing, trekking and adventure camps at hill stations and mountaineering institutes.
