= Curtain: Poirot's Last Case =

1975 Poirot novel by Agatha Christie, written early 1940s

- Dust-jacket illustration of the first UK edition
- Author: Agatha Christie
- Cover artist: Not known
- Language: English
- Genre: Crime novel
- Publisher: Collins Crime Club
- Publication date: September 1975
- Publication place: United Kingdom
- Media type: Print (hardback & paperback)
- Pages: 224 (first edition, hardcover)
- ISBN: 0-00-231619-6
- OCLC: 1945891
- Dewey Decimal: 823/.9/12
- LC Class: PZ3.C4637 Cu PR6005.H66
- Preceded by: Poirot's Early Cases
- Followed by: Sleeping Murder

Curtain: Poirot's Last Case is a work of detective fiction by British writer Agatha Christie, first published in the UK by the Collins Crime Club in September 1975 and in the US by Dodd, Mead and Company later in the same year, selling for $7.95. (Note: Equivalent to $48 in 2025.)

The novel features Hercule Poirot and Arthur Hastings in their final appearances in Christie's works. It is a country house novel, with all the characters and the murder set in one house. Not only does the novel return the characters to the setting of her first novel, The Mysterious Affair at Styles, but it also reunites Poirot and Hastings, who last appeared together in Dumb Witness in 1937. It was adapted for television in 2013.

It is the last novel Christie published before her death. Sleeping Murder, written during the Blitz and published posthumously, is her final published novel.

== Background ==
By the time Curtain was written, the broader political situation was tense. The Spanish Civil War, which had broken out the previous year, upset the balance of power and drew an international response. At the same time, Germany was becoming increasingly aggressive in Europe, having spent the previous few years rearming. In the United Kingdom, there was a sense of political unease towards the future and an expectation of war, although foreign policy remained predicated on appeasement. Stanley Baldwin resigned as prime minister in May 1937 and was replaced by his deputy, Neville Chamberlain.

Due to the threat of war, Christie's husband, the archaeologist Max Mallowan had his digs cancelled from 1938. Following the outbreak of war in September 1939 both undertook war work. Christie moved to London, living in the Isokon Flats in Hampstead. She worked in the pharmacy at University College Hospital—so allowing her to update her knowledge of poisons—while continuing to write. Two books she wrote in this period—"in anticipation of 'being killed in the raids' on London during the Blitz", as she later wrote—were Curtain, with Hercule Poirot, and Sleeping Murder, which featured Miss Marple, also in her last major case. These books remained unpublished and stayed in a bank vault with instructions not to be published until after her death. Her intention—in the knowledge that she could be killed at any time—was that her daughter Rosalind would receive an inheritance. In the event, Curtain was published a few months before she died, with Sleeping Murder being published posthumously.

== Plot ==
Poirot, now old and infirm, calls on the recently widowed Hastings to join him at Styles Court in Essex, the scene of his first case in Britain, which has since been converted to a guest house. He suspects that a person there is involved in five previous murders, all cases with seemingly indisputable culprits. Poirot claims that another murder is about to take place at Styles and asks Hastings to act as his eyes and ears, but, to Hastings' chagrin, will not share the name of his suspect, calling them only X.

Over the next few days, several alarming incidents occur. Colonel Luttrell, owner of the guest house, injures his wife with his shotgun, claiming to have been aiming at a rabbit in the grounds. Hastings, worried that Major Allerton, a guest with the reputation of a womanizer, is after his daughter Judith, tries to poison him. He is intercepted by Poirot and unknowingly drugged with sleeping pills, waking up the next day horrified at himself. Barbara Franklin, the wife of Dr Franklin, Judith's employer, dies by alkaloid poisoning, the subject of her husband's research. Thanks to Poirot's testimony, her death is ruled a suicide. Stephen Norton, a guest with a penchant for birdwatching, implies he has seen something through his binoculars. After talking to Poirot, Norton is found shot dead inside his locked room. Poirot identifies all of these events as the machinations of X, but offers no further explanation to Hastings. Poirot soon dies in his sleep, apparently from a long-expected heart attack. In his will, he leaves Hastings several cryptic clues to help him solve the mystery.

Four months later, a letter from Poirot is delivered to Hastings, explaining everything. X was Norton, an unassuming man highly skilled in the power of suggestion. He used his talents to manipulate people into committing murderous acts, for which he himself could never be prosecuted. Colonel Luttrell was subtly shamed for his subservience to his wife. Hastings was misdirected into thinking that Judith was in love with Allerton, rather than Dr Franklin. Mrs Franklin was inspired into murdering her husband to marry another Styles guest, but ultimately poisoned herself when Hastings inadvertently switched her coffee with Dr Franklin's. Poirot sought to have the case ruled as a suicide to avoid implicating Dr Franklin and Judith, while Norton's visit to Poirot was an attempt to shift suspicion onto them. Poirot drugged Norton with sleeping pills, locked him in his room with a spare key, and shot him - the murder he told Hastings would happen at Styles, as he saw no other way to stop Norton. Conflicted over taking a life, Poirot purposefully left his ampoules of nitrate out of reach, inviting his end. Poirot ends his account by encouraging Hastings to begin living his life again.

== Characters ==
Name	Background and biography
Hercule Poirot	Poirot, a retired detective from the Belgian Police Force arrived in the UK in 1916 and, following his successful solving of a murder at an Essex country house, became a private detective. Reliant on Criminal psychology and what he terms his "little grey cells", he is often accompanied by his Watsonian companion, Captain Hastings. Hastings described Poirot as "hardly more than five feet four inches but carried himself with great dignity. His head was exactly the shape of an egg, and he always perched it a little on one side. His moustache was very stiff and military. The neatness of his attire was almost incredible". Intended by Christie to be as unlike Sherlock Holmes as possible, in her words, he has a wholly "bourgeois attitude to murder". By the time the action of Curtain takes place, Poirot could be 120–130 years old and very ill. Apparently confined to a wheelchair, he has dismissed his old valet and employed a new one before arriving in Essex. He summons Hastings and tells him, "You and I, Hastings, are going hunting once again".
Arthur Hastings	Arthur Hastings is a traditional English gentleman who was injured in World War I, following which he retired from the British Army with the rank of captain. Hastings first met Poirot in Belgium before the war, but it is at Styles in 1916 that Hastings becomes Poirot's traditional Watson-like companion. It is a role, however, which he played not as well as the original. Critics have considered him even more foolish than his Victorian counterpart, however, with Howard Haycraft calling him "easily the stupidest of all modern Watsons". Julian Symons has called him "a Watson of extreme stupidity" and "splendidly obtuse", while Brental—addressing the comparison with Watson itself—argues that "whereas Watson famously sees but does not observe, Hastings often fails to see". Poirot describes him as "an admirable man, but intensely English". (Note: In Poirot's voice, in 'A Letter to my Publisher', 15 April 1936. Christie uses the letter—published by Dodd Mead in a Poirot omnibus edition Hercule Poirot: Master Detective—to talk about Poirot's early work in the Belgian Police and how he first met Hastings and Japp. It contains several tongue-in-cheek comments regarding Poirot's character and his views on his cases. Republished in 2016 as part of HarperCollins's Styles: Hercule Poirot’s First and Last Cases.) By the time Hastings is reunited with Poirot for Curtain his wife has died and his Argentine ranch is in the capable hands of his son. Hastings has nothing to stop him from accepting Poirot's invitation and, indeed, is secretly drawn by his mention that Hastings's favourite daughter, Judith, is also at Styles. Once there, Hastings spends much of the narrative not so much forestalling X's next murder but as speculating on Poirot's identification of him.
Stephen Norton	Stephen Norton is grey-haired, limps and has a stammer. Described by Elizabeth Cole as unselfish and "very considerate for a man", he is also a bird watcher, always carrying field glasses, who is also haemophobic. This, in the eyes of the other guests, makes him harmless. However, it is this very colourlessness—his "absorption in the natural world" and apparent ignorance of what people around him are doing or thinking that makes him the "spirit of evil" at Styles. Boyd-Carrington calls him a "nice fellow"; Elizabeth Cole, "ineffectual"; Hastings, "inoffensive" and "inconspicuous". Crescenti suggests that his slight disability in speech (Note: Norton occasionally says things which seem out of place or made without thinking, such as when he says—within earshot of the henpecked Colonel Luttrell—about another character needing to wed, "marry and settle down? And suppose his wife bullies him—". Hastings goes on to describe Norton's attempts at covering up his remark while idle chatter, which "just made just worse". However, Norton's lapsus lingua are deliberate: he is steadily driving the colonel towards the point where he breaks and, in a fit of anger, nearly shoots his wife.)and movement—as well as his apparently accidental crass comments—make him an instinctively sympathetic character to both his fellow characters and the reader. Dubbed X by Poirot, he has perfected the method of performing the perfect murder: by persuading others to do it for him without them realising it. Poirot tells Hastings, "make no mistake, X could not be touched by the law. He was safe." Norton is not revealed to be X until Poirot's posthumous dénouement.
Judith Hastings	Judith has a Bachelor of Science degree and is employed as a research assistant by Dr Franklin. She holds similarly strong views as her employer on the sanctity of human life. She is embarrassed and annoyed at Hastings's over-zealous attempts at parenting, particularly when he attempts to put her off Allerton. (Note: To which Judith retorts: Really, Father, you’re being too idiotic. Don't you realise that at my age I'm capable of managing my own affairs? You’ve no earthly right to control what I do or whom I choose to make a friend of. It's this senseless interfering in their children’s lives that is so infuriating about fathers and mothers. I'm very fond of you—but I'm an adult woman and my life is my own. Don't start making a Mr Barrett (Note: Mr Barret is a reference to a character from the 1930 play, The Barretts of Wimpole Street, or the film of four years later, in which a tyrannical father Edward Moulton-Barrett terrorised his nine daughters and forbade them from marrying the men of their choice. Christie also references him at the end of Sleeping Murder, which involves a man desperate to prevent his sister from enjoying herself.) of yourself.) Judith is only playing with Allerton, though, and is actually "honourably" in love with Franklin. Hastings describes her as conveying "a sense of tragedy" about her and recalls to himself that she occasionally looked "like her namesake before she cut off the head of Holofernes". Judith is subtly encouraged by Norton to express "questionable views" on the sanctity of human life, in his attempt to get her to see Mrs Franklin as a "leech" and attend to her accordingly. She is also sympathetic to Margaret Litchfield, although she tells her father that she would not have the courage to either kill someone or subsequently confess to it.
Dr John Franklin	John Franklin is a research chemist, and is sufficiently focused on his work as to be indifferent to social stimuli and norms. As such, he remains effectively unaware of his wife's feelings or any of the undercurrents among the guests at Styles. He has a rigid sense of duty that does not allow him to divorce his wife, even for her own sake. At the close of the novel, after her death, he reveals himself to be in love with Judith, with whom he is travelling to Africa for field research. An unsentimental scientist, he holds extreme views on involuntary euthanasia. Franklin knew the Litchfield family and is extremely sympathetic to Margaret, views which he passes on to Judith.
Barbara Franklin	She attempts to dominate her husband with a faux hypochondria and egotism. She is worked on by Norton to try and kill her husband with the intention of then marrying Boyd-Carrington.
Sir William Boyd Carrington	Boyd-Carrington, while seemingly the embodiment of success—in Hasting's words, "an Englishman of the old school, straightforward, fond of out-of-doors life, and the kind of man who can command"—is also privately depressed following the death of his wife and his inability, despite his houses and wealth, to prevent it. She was young and beautiful; she was also from a family of alcoholics, which killed her less than a year after her marriage. York suggests that his all-round bonhomie might be a shield for his inner heartache.
Major Allerton	Allerton is an egoist, concerned only for his own pleasure—mostly with women and involving more than one at a time—and where it would come from next. He is a deliberately superficial and irresponsible character. A cad, Hastings takes an instant dislike to him: "I suspected him of racketing around, of gambling, of drinking hard, and of being first and last a womanizer". and when he is later led to believe that Allerton intends to seduce and throw over Judith, determines to take the law into his own hands and kill him, justifying it by the fact that he would be saving other women from the same fate in future. Poirot, however, foresees Hastings' plan and foils it.
Colonel Toby Luttrell	Reduced to a permanent timidity by his wife's bullying.
Daisy Luttrell	A theatrical character who uses an exaggerated Irish brogue when she wants; Hastings comments "it was a mere affectation", while also noting that "behind the veneer of her charming old lady manner, I caught a glimpse of flint-like hardness".
Elizabeth Cole	Elizabeth Cole, previously Litchfield, is the only remaining family member after her sister Margaret murdered their abusive father. Margaret was arrested, convicted and died in Broadmoor. Elizabeth considers herself "maimed" by her family and background.
Nurse Craven	Soon after the death of Barbara Franklin, Hastings realises "suddenly that Nurse Craven must know a good deal about the Franklin ménage".
Curtiss	Curtiss is Poirot's valet, whom the detective hired just before taking up residence in Styles; his previous employment had been as an orderly in a sanatorium. When Hastings learns this towards the end, he half-recalls that former patients of such institutions often remained on as warders. Nonetheless, Hastings has until then considered him "trustworthy and competent" and learns from Curtiss the extent of Poirot's decline. Curtiss is physically bigger and stronger than his predecessor, as he has to carry Poirot into the garden and back every day.
Georges	Georges, Poirot's long-time valet. Sent away by Poirot before the latter's move to Styles, when Hastings visits him he is living in Eastbourne, looking after his sick mother.

=== Comparison with The Mysterious Affair at Styles ===
A deep and spreading sadness permeated me. How true it was! Here we were, a collection of twilit people. Grey heads, grey hearts, grey dreams. Myself, sad and lonely, the woman beside me also a bitter and disillusioned creature. Dr Franklin, eager, ambitious, curbed and thwarted, his wife a prey to ill health. Quiet little Norton limping about looking at birds. Even Poirot, the once brilliant Poirot, now a broken, crippled old man.

— Elizabeth Cole to Hastings, describing Stephen Norton

The literary scholar Professor R. A. York has argued that many themes first encountered in Styles reoccur in Curtain, including the same atmosphere of anxiety against an oppressive summer backdrop. In the days following the death of Mrs Franklin, an event occurs to link the atmosphere of the Iglethorpe's Styles to that of the Luttrells'. Hastings meets an "old woman with rheumy eyes and an unpleasant ghoulish manner" who remembers him from the first case (Note: Although, contributing to the difficulties in dating either the story or Poirot's age, she states that the events of 1916 took place "twenty years ago and over".) and who by doing so suggests a house "unable to escape from a deathly past", argues York. Unhappy characters openly populate both books—if the former does offer most of them a degree of happy ending—although it is only by coming back to Styles years later that Hastings realises this. Curtain's characters are equally alienated. Through their comments, an atmosphere of oppressive foreboding is built up, with a concomitant expectation—a superstition—of doom. Part of the reason Norton finds such a rich vein to work on is due to the state of post-war Styles; because it became a guest house, it became open to people of all different social classes who would often not necessarily have mixed and among who he can hide, chameleon-like. Much of the underlying frustrations in Styles are family-orientated. In the first case, this is due to the oppressive atmosphere that Alfred Inglethorpe conveys and his wife's closeness to her fortune. In the second, it is because of individual faults; Colonel Luttrell's timidity and his wife's bullying, Dr Franklin's sense of duty in the face of what would be better for both he and his wife, and Hastings and Judith, the former who is over-protective and the latter who reacts badly to it, for example.

What was, in 1920, "a glorious old place" and "a fine property" has become neglected and shabby. Professor Marty S. Knepper argues that the common motif between the two is the bond between the detective and his companion: Curtain "ends where the series begins", with the reunion of Poirot and Hastings at the country house after many years had passed. Academic Fredrica Crescentini suggests Hastings' opening words (Note: "Who is there who has not felt a sudden startled pang at reliving an old experience, or feeling an old emotion? 'I have done this before ...' Why do those words always move one so profoundly?") indicate his sense of deja vu, a nostalgia, that represents eternal return.

== Themes ==
=== Evil ===
Evil is a common theme throughout Christie's works, particularly the fact that almost everyone can be a killer in the right circumstances. This is most openly addressed in Curtain. Poirot states that "there has been an epidemic of that in the world of late years—L’appe´tit vient en mangeant". Throughout his career Poirot has argued that everyone has the capability of killing, and often tells a story of a child who kills a kitten accidentally because they do not understand the consequences of their actions. (Note: In Curtain Poirot tells Hastings: I have known a child, annoyed by its kitten, say "Keep still or I'll hit you on the head and kill you" and actually do so—to be stunned and horrified a moment later when it realizes that the kitten's life will not return—because, you see, really the child loves that kitten dearly. So then, we are all potential murderers.) This York calls "the universality of murderous impulses". The difference between Curtain and Poirot's previous expositions on the theme is that in this final case, he delves into the question with much more depth and so more plausibly. Expanding his theory, Poirot asserts that while all humans have the ability, or wish, to kill, they must possess the "will to kill"; the former is common, while the latter is, he says, much rarer. Margaret and Nicholas Birns have argued that "indeed, this is the premise for the entire novel. Christie's mysteries do give us characters all of whom are deemed capable of murder, but here the potential murderers especially appear to undergo a surprising transformation of character to be capable of such an act."

=== Personalities ===
There isn’t really much to tell. He's very nice—rather shy—just a little stupid, perhaps. He's always been rather delicate. He's lived with his mother—rather a peevish, stupid woman. She bossed him a good deal, I think. She died a few years ago. He's keen on birds and flowers and things like that. He's a very kind person—and he’s the sort of person who sees a lot.

— Elizabeth Cole to Hastings, describing Stephen Norton

Norton is the only character at Styles who has no overt personality traits—the Birns describe him as "nondescript and colourless"—his only absorption is bird watching and a concomitant interest in nature. A 21st-century analysis by Professor Ashok Malhotra has identified qualities of what he terms the "Child Man"—childlike qualities which continue into adulthood: they do not vanish "but merely get pushed into the psychic/social underbelly, where it becomes even more deadly". Norton's upbringing, he argues, makes the man:

Norton was the only son of a bossy woman. He was mild-mannered and quite incapable of asserting himself. He was slightly lame and so unable to take part in games and sports in his childhood. He had a morbid fear of violence and was often ridiculed by his friends when he was a child. He grew into a likeable sort of a chap who no one took much notice of ... the rage within him was so strong that he triggered off a series of murders by simply acting as a catalyst and influencing others to commit the crime.

Few of the characters seem to care about one another, and when they do, it emphasises the noir atmosphere. The relationship between Hastings and Judith, for example, is one of contempt—verging on hatred at one point—on her behalf and almost fear on his. It is difficult for the reader to empathise with any of the characters, and so little interest in the victim, whichever of them that might be.

=== Power ===
Hastings attempts to wield paternal power over Judith. Poirot, in turn, wields his power over Hastings. Franklin suggests that 80% of the world's population is useless and should be eradicated—at a time when, in reality, the UK was in a war against Nazi Germany, the government of which believed something not dissimilar. Norton, as X, has power over almost everyone, and Poirot can only assert his power over Norton by killing him. In doing so, he "does what Judith only preached". The reader's perception, argues J. C. Bernthal: "if the detective—the symbol of law and order—cannot be trusted to be readers' moral compass, whom or what can be trusted?"

=== Shakespeare's Iago ===
==== Christie and Iago ====
Coleridge described Iago's malice as "motiveless malignancy", and the same phrase has been used regarding Norton's. This makes Norton stand out among Christie's murderers, all of whom commit their crimes for some form of material gain. Norton, though, has "no other motive than schadenfreude: malicious joy or spiteful glee".

Norton is an Iago-like character, and York argues that "the literary analogy is made very much explicit"; Poirot himself refers to Norton as an "honest Iago". (Note: Talking of Margaret Litchfield, Poirot tells Hastings that "her father was killed, not by his daughter, but by that kind sympathetic family friend, that 'honest Iago' Stephen Norton".) In doing so, he is quoting Othello himself at the close of Act I, when he places his wife Desdemona under Iago's care, saying "Honest Iago, / My Desdemona I leave to thee". (Note: Shakespeare uses variations on the word "honest" 51 times through the play. The word is used both as a noun and as an adjective 26 times, describing Iago. Specifically, Othello calls Iago "honest" 13 times, Iago self-describes as such 10 times, Cassio twice, and Desdemona once.) Iago himself states that it is easy for him to toy with people "for sport and profit", and, to that end, he uses words as a slow poison. He explains to the audience in Act II, scene iii, that he plans to "pour this pestilence" into Othello's ear.

Christie is known to have been fascinated by the character; indeed, her biographer calls her "obsessed" by him. She uses elements of him in other books, but never to the extent of mirroring his very nature as she does in Curtain. For example, in 1931's Peril at End House, Christie, through Poirot, has the detective praise Iago because "he got others to execute" his crime. In Murder in Mesopotamia, 1936, one of the main characters is accused of being "a kind of female Iago. She must have drama. But she doesn't want to be involved herself. She's always outside pulling strings—looking on—enjoying it." In 1939's Hercule Poirot's Christmas Poirot knew Othello, and describes Iago as "the perfect murderer ... the deaths of Desdemona, of Cassio—indeed of Othello himself—are all lago's crimes, planned by him, carried out by him. And he remains outside the circle, untouched by suspicion—or could have done so." (Note: Poirot goes on to explain to Hastings how, in his view, the perfection of Iago's art had made a rod for Shakespeare's own back, as, although justice needed to be done and seen to be done, this was impossible while Iago was unassailable. So Shakespeare had to create a device to implicate his character—"the clumsiest of devices—the handkerchief—not at all in keeping with Iago's central technique and a blunder of which one feels certain he would not have been guilty". Critic David Lehman notes that Christie, however, has no need of anything so clumsy, "not with Poirot's 'little grey cells at work".) Poirot—discussing what light the character of the victim can cast upon the crime that kills them—suggests that "the frank and unsuspicious mind of Desdemona was the direct cause of her death. A more suspicious woman would have seen Iago's machinations and circumvented them much earlier". Her interest in Iago carries into works written under her pseudonym, Mary Westmacott. In The Rose and the Yew Tree, her protagonist understands how Iago suffered, "hat[ing] the human being who's up amongst the stars"—like Desdemona—while he—like Iago—languished on earth.

==== Norton and Iago ====
Norton suffers from a severe inferiority complex as well as being a mental sadist with a lust for revenge on ordinary people. He is a sociopath and a "murder addict". He is effectively a catalyst: he changes the things around him, remaining unchanged himself through the process. He does not commit murder himself, but subtly encourages and manipulates other people into killing; Poirot knows Norton to, effectively, bring out the murderer hidden inside everyone, by way of "emotional, manipulative cognition", argue the Birns. Most of Christie's villains murder for profit, or some other form of gain; Norton does not benefit at all from his crimes except for private pleasure. Such is the random nature of the murders that Norton has committed that he is one of the few psychopaths that Christie ever created; few of her other villains express Norton's contempt for life. David Suchet, in an essay for the RSC, comments on Iago's reasons that "almost everyone who has ever written about Iago or played Iago is in search of one thing: motivation". Poirot describes Norton's technique:

X knew the exact word, the exact phrase, the intonation even to suggest and to bring cumulative pressure on a weak spot! It could be done. It was done without the victim ever suspecting. It was not hypnotism—hypnotism would not have been successful. It was something more insidious, more deadly.

Playing on his companions' "deep insecurities and fears", Norton's pleasure is a vicarious one. He has perfected the psychological art, like Iago, of provoking and goading others into killing without him ever being suspected. However, it is insufficient that Norton merely gets the innocent to murder; as Poirot puts it, "he wants the whole gamut of emotion, suspicion, fear, the coils of the law". As a result, in the five cases that Poirot identifies to Hastings, there were not only the five murder victims but also the suicide of one killer, the execution of another and a third who died, insane, in an institution.

While the reader knows that X has killed several people before the novel's action begins, as explained by Poirot, Norton also has several other plots on the go as the novel unfolds. Norton feels empowered. He implicates multiple characters in his various attempts at crime throughout the novel, including Hastings himself. Other would-be victims are Colonel Luttrell, whom Norton subconsciously encourages to shoot his wife by telling him stories of weak men, albeit as if accidentally. He also works up Mrs Franklin to the state where she is willing to kill her husband. In both cases, however, he is foiled; in that of Luttrel, an inner, if abeyant, fondness for his wife resurfaces, and he misfires at the last second, while Mrs Franklin—thanks to Hastings accidentally swapping the cups around—drinks the poisoned coffee she has brewed for her husband. Hastings, anticlimactically, fell asleep before Allerton returned.

== Poirot and murder ==
Such is the nature of Norton's crimes that Poirot must take the law into his own hands to see Norton punished. In doing so, Poirot becomes similar to his victim, who also had, in Poirot's words, "the keys of life". Both Poirot and Norton, argues critic J. C. Bernthal, "illustrate dangerous extremes in the pursuit of power" and perhaps even two sides of the same coin. Robert Barnard argues that unsolved crime—murder in particular—is socially destabilising. Poirot, traditionally the voice of a reasonable and law-abiding society, finds himself questioning his own position. The theme of Poirot's responsibility had previously been raised in Murder on the Orient Express, where Poirot presents two possible conclusions, one of which—and that which is eventually chosen—lets 12 killers go free without any legal process at all. In Curtain, his actions are premeditated but also harder to justify to himself. In his closing statement to Hastings, he writes that "I do not know, Hastings, if what I have done is justified or not justified. No—I do not know." In his humility, he puts his medicine aside and allows God to act as it would. The critic and author Stuart Sim describes the detective, in these circumstances, as "compelled to commit criminal acts in order to punish criminals, since the justice system can no longer reliably guarantee that this outcome will occur". Poirot himself emulates the actions of the killer to varying degrees. Even before committing the act itself, he lies and deceives (pretending to be more ill than he is, for example) and almost commits perjury (deliberately leading an inquest to a faulty conclusion), although he emphasised to Hastings that he was not under oath at the time.

Poirot has said many times that he "does not approve of murder", and usually, this disapproval results in legal justice being meted out to the criminal at the end. But in Curtain, this is not possible, so he feels it necessary to take the law into his own hands. (Note: Poirot's method of killing Norton—shooting him through his forehead—is reminiscent of the murderer in And Then There Were None, who killed himself in the same way, also leaving what Christie calls in both works the brand of Cain.) York notes that this is not the first time Christie's readership encounters "someone who puts to death people who have caused the death of others in ways not open to legal punishment and who then commits suicide, recording his strategy in a posthumous document". Before Poirot, Mr Justice Wargrave plays the same role in And Then There Were None, although where the judge is absolutely certain of his legal justification—"I had no doubt whatever, after my long court experience, that one and all were guilty"—Poirots is conflicted by doubt. He recognises that he is playing God where only God has the right to do so. On the one hand, he is sure he has saved future innocent lives whom Norton would have destroyed, but on the other, suggests Evans, his sense of moral superiority "is undercut" because he lacks the judge's certainty, telling Hastings "I am very humble and I say like a little child, 'I do not know'". He has already, in 1936, told Superintendent Battle, in Cards on the Table that vigilantism "happens, Battle. It happens," in response to Battle's protest that ordinary people should never take the law into their own hands.

Curtain demonstrates varying levels of evil, from the main villain to being "alarmingly present in the actions of other characters as well, including those of the detectives". In Curtain, pre-war moral certainties have—like post-war society more broadly—broken down, and not only the killer Norton represents this: Hastings decides to commit murder, Judith is suggested as being committing adultery, and also disowns her father, while Poirot lies in court. (Note: Several of Christie's post-war books reflect similar uncertainty. Taken at the Flood (1948) features a woman who, having worked throughout the war refuses to return to her pre-war social position; Crooked House (1949) discusses the morality of conscientious objection; in A Murder Is Announced (1950) most of the major characters have re-imagined their own recent histories.) These are, even before Poirot commits the final crime, direct breaches of several of the Ten Commandments. Thus, Christie calls into practice the commonly accepted understanding of good and evil in detective fiction. Franco Moretti has argued that in Curtain, the "murderer and victim meet in the locked room because they are fundamentally similar".

== Reception and interpretation ==
=== Reception ===
Curtain was written against a background of devastation. By this time, Christie had lived through one world war and was experiencing another. It was a time, argues author Nizar Zouidi, of "vulnerability ... apprehension and uncertainties", death and destruction were unprecedented. The novel was released a few months before Christie's own death. The extent to which both he and his creator, suggests J. C. Bernthal, symbolised the Golden Age of Crime was such that he has been the only fictional character to have an obituary published in The New York Times, and "on the front page, no less".

In a review titled "The last labour of Hercules", Matthew Coady in The Guardian, on 9 October 1975, wrote that the book was both "a curiosity and a triumph". He repeated the tale of the book being written some thirty years before and then stated that "through it, Dame Agatha, whose recent work has shown a decline, is seen once more at the peak of her ingenuity." Coady called Captain Hastings the "densest of Dr Watsons [but] ... never has the stupidity of the faithful companion-chronicler been so cunningly exploited as it is here." Coady summarised the absolute basics of the plot and the questions raised within it and then said,

In providing the answers, the great illusionist of crime fiction provides a model demonstration of reader manipulation. The seemingly artless, simplistic Christie prose is mined with deceits. Inside the old, absurd conventions of the Country House mystery, she reworks the least likely person trick with a freshness rivalling the originality she displayed nearly 50 years ago in The Murder of Roger Ackroyd. For the egotistic Poirot, hero of some 40 books ... it is a dazzlingly theatrical finish. "Goodbye, cher ami", runs his final message to the hapless Hastings. "They were good days." For addicts, everywhere, they were among the best.

Two months after its publication, Coady nominated Curtain as his Book of the Year in a column of critics' choices. He said, "No crime story of 1975 has given me more undiluted pleasure. As a critic, I welcome it, as a reminder that sheer ingenuity can still amaze." Maurice Richardson in The Observer of 5 October 1975 summed up: "One of her most highly contrived jobs, artificial as a mechanical birdcage, but an unputdownable swansong." Overall, it was one of the bestselling books of 1975.

On 6 August 1975, The New York Times published a front-page obituary of Poirot with a photograph to mark his death.

=== Interpretation ===
Curtain has been described as one of Christie's most psychological works in which everyone is examined, whether victim, killer, near-killer and detective. Poirot is "at his cruellest", says Rachel Franks, at one point telling Hastings to "Go away. You are obstinate and extremely stupid" and that he wishes he did not need to rely on him. York argues that, however pervasive evil is in the story, there is still room, occasionally for "some mildness ...and it is sometimes comic", albeit often due to Hastings's clumsiness. But with Poirot on the brink of death, in Curtain appears more human than he has ever seemed, argues the novelist Rhys Bowen. Berhthal has argued that Christie had already "dealt the death blow" to the Golden Age of crime with 1939's And Then There Were None, in which every character was a killer. With Curtain, he suggests, "she wrote its elegy". Golden Age detectives were "famously infallible", he argues, but Poirot's last message to Hastings reveals his self-doubt.

Converse to the praise it received, David Lehman has argued that, notwithstanding "all the talk about Iago", Curtain is as much merely a sporting crossword puzzle as any of her previous novels. The crime writer and critic Robert Barnard was also critical. In A Talent to Deceive, he said Curtain—while based "on an interesting idea"—was too clever for Christie to execute. It needed, he suggests, "greater subtlety in the handling than Christie's style or characterisation will allow (the characters here are in any case quite exceptionally pallid). In fact, for a long-cherished idea, and as an exit for Poirot, this is oddly perfunctory in execution". He later repeated his description of it being perfunctory, and that further, it was "as if she was beguiled by her own reputation for thinking the unthinkable into making Poirot the murderer, but could not come up with a satisfactory plot, set of characters, or motivation to justify the solution". In response, York suggests that Barnard, probably expecting a whodunnit along the traditional Golden Age style, therefore failed to notice "the thematic richness of this, her most ambitious work".

The character of Hastings is slightly different in Curtain to its predecessors, argues Franks. She suggests that while in earlier novels, he has been very much in the shadow of Poirot, now he changes before the reader's eyes "from supportive sidekick to hardboiled investigator followed by a brief descent into noir". Not only is he at his most loyal, but he is also at his most hard-boiled. He is willing not only to do things traditionally repugnant to him—spying through keyholes, for example—but even to the extent of taking the law into his own hands.

Folklorist and academic Eliot A. Singer suggests that, when Poirot speaks to Hastings about the latter's lack of suspicion, she is also talking to the reader, her audience more generally:

But perhaps, after all, you have suspected the truth? Perhaps when you read this, you already know. But somehow I do not think so ... No, you are too trusting ... you have too beautiful a nature"

Singer notes that one of the reader's basic expectations, which they should be able to take for granted before the story begins, is that "the murder must be committed by the murderer". In Curtain, though, Christie even breaks this rule. (Note: And a rule it was as Christie knew well; as a member of the Detection Club, she was party to the Ten Commandments laid down by Ronald Knox, the seventh of which Curtain defies: "The detective himself must not commit the crime".) Rachel Franks has suggested that it is possible to reframe the solution to Curtain similarly to how Pierre Bayard, in his Who Killed Roger Ackroyd, redirected the guilt of Dr Sheppard onto his sister Caroline using the same clues and narrative Christie provides. Franks argues that while Norton is claimed to be a killer, Poirot later claims to have also committed a murder, and Hastings killed Barbara Franklin—if unknowingly—the only murder of Curtain's that can be proven. Yet, she suggests, the true killer here was not Hastings but Judith. She bases her re-interpretation on the fact that Judith had means and motive: the former, in the form of the calabar bean, which is central to her employer's research, and the latter, her wish to marry him as soon as she is able.

== References or allusions ==
Curtain possesses a timelessness, set after the Second World War, yet returning to the setting of the first novel. Poirot alludes on several occasions to previous cases. He mentions that once, in Egypt, he attempted to warn a murderer before the person committed the crime. That case is the one retold in Death on the Nile. He mentions that there was another case in which he had done the same thing: almost certainly that retold in "Triangle at Rhodes" (published in Murder in the Mews in 1937). In The A.B.C. Murders, Inspector Japp says to Poirot: "Shouldn't wonder if you ended by detecting your own death;" an indication that the idea of Curtain had already formed in the author's mind in 1935.

== Adaptation for television ==
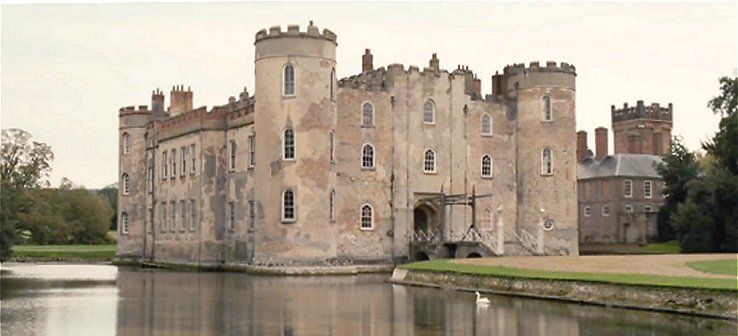
Shirburn Castle doubles as Styles Court in the TV adaptation, 2013

The novel was adapted in 2013 starring David Suchet as Poirot as the last season's final episode of ITV's Agatha Christie's Poirot. (Note: Suchet had previously played Iago in Terry Hands's 1985 Royal Shakespeare Company production of the play, opposite Ben Kingsley's moor. Suchet said his interpretation of Iago was based on the premise that "human beings are given to finding justifications for deeds or actions to make those deeds allowable: in their own minds even though they are not always valid justifications. And so it is with lago." In other words, the human weakness that Iago shows is the same human weakness of humanity itself. Suchet's Iago, suggested The Daily Telegraph's critic John Barber, was convincing because "you would swear he was dead honest", while in The Guardian, Michael Billington praised the portrayal as "not the calculating Audenesque practical joker, but a crafty improviser forever thinking on his feet".) By the time the episode was aired—Suchet had been playing Poirot for nearly a quarter of a century—the two were "almost inseparable for many", and the episode possessed an "inevitable ... aura of fin-de-siècle gloom". As a result of the pressure, Suchet requested they film Curtain before the rest of the final series, although it was still broadcast last. It was, however, the first of the series to be filmed. Hugh Fraser again returned to the role of Hastings, following a ten-year absence; stars such as Alice Orr-Ewing (Judith Hastings), Helen Baxendale (Elizabeth Cole), Anne Reid (Daisy Luttrell), Matthew McNulty (Major Allerton), Shaun Dingwall (Dr Franklin), Aidan McArdle (Stephen Norton) and Philip Glenister (Sir William Boyd Carrington) were among the other cast. The programme was aired in Britain on 13 November 2013, and later on Acorn TV on 25 August 2014. With the exception of The Mysterious Affair at Styles, set in the First World War, the rest of the ITV Poirot series are set in the 1930s, regardless of when the novels were written, or the contemporary features in each of the novels; this last story sets the year as 1949.

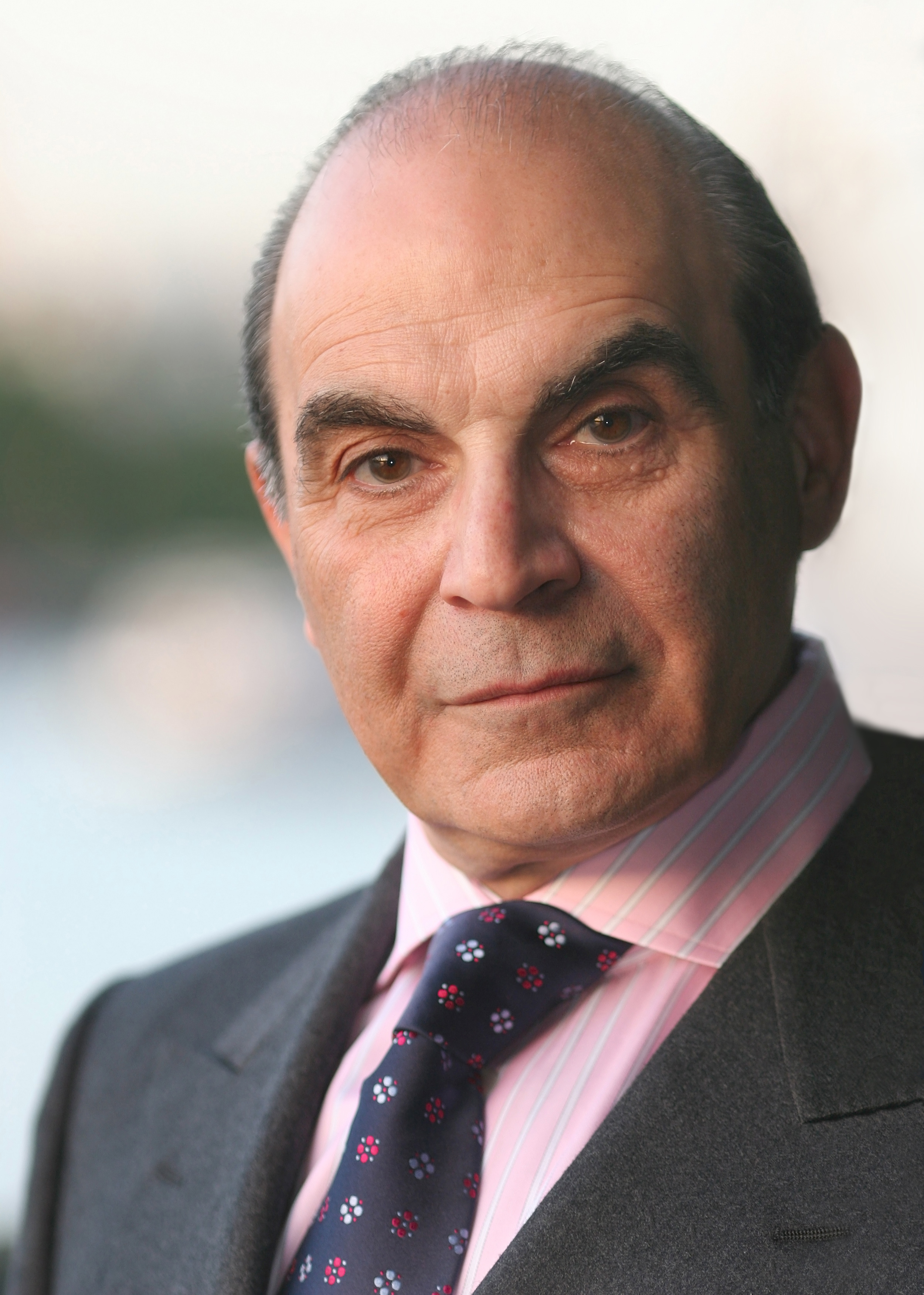
British actor David Suchet played Poirot 65 times over 22 years.

In 2015, Curtain was nominated for Outstanding Television Movie for its 67th Emmy Awards, but eventually lost to Bessie. David Hinckley praised the character while criticising the plot adaption. Arguing in the New York Daily News that it "felt uneasily like the funeral of an old friend" and as having "heart-rending emotional depth", he also criticised the direction for being "very creaky indeed". However, Hinckley particularly praised the show's evocation of the characters' painful pasts.

== Publication history ==
Curtain was first published in the UK by the Collins Crime Club in September 1975 and in the US by Dodd, Mead and Company later in the same year, selling for $7.95.

- 1975, Collins Crime Club (London), September 1975, hardcover, 224 pp ISBN 0-00-231619-6
- 1975, Dodd Mead and Company (New York), hardcover, 238 pp, ISBN 0-396-07191-0
- 1976, Pocket Books (New York), paperback, 280 pp
- 1976, Ulverscroft Large-print edition, hardcover, 325 pp, ISBN 0-85456-498-5
- 1977, Fontana Books (Imprint of HarperCollins), paperback, 188 pp
- 1992, G.K. Hall & Co. large-print edition, hardcover, ISBN 0-8161-4539-3
