= Sean Grover =

American psychotherapist

- Education: New York University
- Occupation: Psyhotherapist
- Notable work: When Kids Call the Shots (2015)

Sean Grover is a New York-based group psychotherapist, parenting thought leader, and author. He has contributed to national news outlets including The New York Times, Wall Street Journal, The Associated Press, The Economist, The Atlantic and The Chicago Tribune, as well as online, with sites including the Huffington Post, Lifehacker, PsychCentral and Mother Magazine. Grover's international contributions include Baby Radio (Greece), Woman.com (Germany) and The Indian Express, among others.

In 2015, Grover published a parenting book called When Kids Call the Shots: How to Seize Control from Your Darling Bully and Enjoy Being a Parent Again, which was named an editor's pick for best new nonfiction by Publishers Weekly. The book has been translated into Chinese, Korean, and Russian.

== Career ==
Grover received his master's degree in social work from New York University and began his career as a school social worker in the New York City Department of Education public-school system. He implemented youth programming about dropout prevention and received a grant from The New York Times' Neediest Cases Fund.

Grover developed his group leaderships skills during his decade long mentorship with Dr. Louis Ormont, a pioneering American psychologist and one of the earliest practitioners of group psychotherapy based on a psychoanalytic model.

Grover was interviewed by The New York Times in July 2016 on effective grief and crisis management techniques parents and families can use when children and teens experience trauma. He often supports writers, editors, and reporters in developing content geared toward addressing child and adolescent development, urban parenting, relationship conflict, and approaches to therapy and healing, including individual and group therapies. Grover was interviewed and quoted in the book What We Talk About When We Talk About Rape by Sohaila Abdulali (The New Press, 2018).

Grover is a group therapist for teenagers and adults. He is a leader of workshops and trainings for parents, clinicians, and educators in New York City. He also authors a blog for Psychology Today. He has partnered with hosts on more than 30 different radio shows and podcasts, including 1010 WINS, KGO San Francisco, Sue Atkins' UK Parenting Podcast, Mom Enough, Parent Talk, and Rad Dad, among others.

In 2015, Grover was interviewed by Jenna Bush for The Today Show, discussing how parents can strengthen their leadership in the family and prevent bullying behavior in their children.

Grover's one-act play The Talking Cure, produced Off-Broadway in 2017, was nominated for best play by the New York Theater Festival. The play explores therapist burnout and follows twenty-four hours in the life of Dr. Arthur Russo, a Manhattan psychotherapist, who is undone by four challenging patients and an unexpected tragedy. A critic from the Time Square Chronicles wrote: "Mr. Grover's writing cuts to the heart of America…The Talking Cure is about loneliness and how we fail ourselves and others."

== Publications ==
=== Books ===
- Grover, Sean. (2015). When Kids Call the Shots: How to Seize Control from Your Darling Bully -- and Enjoy Being a Parent Again. New York: AMACOM. ISBN 0814436005

=== Book chapters ===
- Grover, Sean (2016), "Depressed Adolescents", in Haen, Craig & Aronson, Seth, Handbook of Child and Adolescent Group Therapy: A Practitioner’s Reference. New York: Routledge, pp. 311–321. ISBN 9781138954588
- Grover, Sean (2010), "What's So Funny? The Group Leaders Use of Humor in Adolescent Groups", in Fehr, Scott Simon, 101 Interventions in Group Therapy. New York: Routledge, pp. 87–92. ISBN 0415882176

=== Clinical articles ===
- Grover, Sean (2016), "Separation Anxiety in Adolescence: How to Grow A Healthy Teenager". Issues in Psychoanalytic Psychotherapy. 38(1).
- Grover, Sean (2018), "'My Candle Burns at Both Ends, It Will Not Last the Night': Psychotherapist Burnout—Causes and Cures". Issues in Psychoanalytic Psychotherapy. 40(1).
