= Pawanexh Kohli =

Captain and Professor Pawanexh Kohli
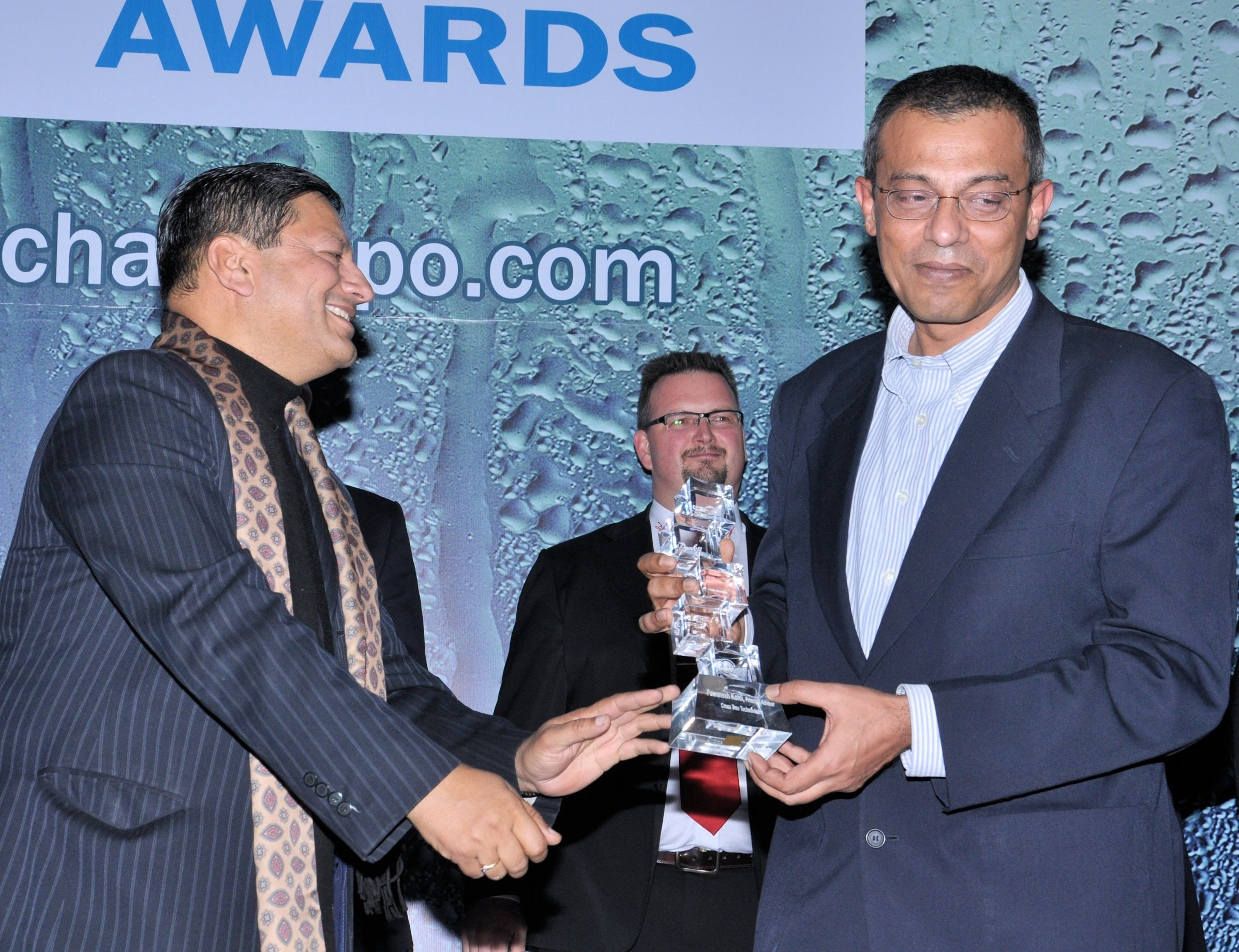
- Pawanexh Kohli receiving Exemplary Thought Leader Award, New Delhi, 2012
- Born: May 1963 (age 63); Ludhiana, (Punjab, India)
- Citizenship: Indian
- Occupations: Agribusiness strategy, cold chain, food loss and economics
- Known for: Founding CEO of National Centre for Cold-chain Development (NCCD)

Pawanexh Kohli is the founding Chief Executive of India's National Centre for Cold-chain Development (NCCD), the premier think-tank in agri-logistics set up in public-private-partnership mode in 2012, and from 2012 to 2020 was the Chief Advisor to Ministry of Agriculture & Farmers Welfare.

== Early life ==
Born to an Indian Air Force officer, he accompanied his parents with their postings at various Indian cities. As a consequence, his education was cross cultural and spread across various regions in India and the schools he studied in include Frank Anthony School in Agra, Bishops School in Pune, Jesus and Mary School in Amritsar before completing his high schooling from The Air Force School in New Delhi. He subsequently completed his professional education from LBS College of Advanced Maritime Studies and Research as a certified Master Mariner, having earlier completed his professional training at the TS Rajendra.

== Career ==
In 1982, Kohli commenced his career as a mariner and was later master of oceangoing ships for the final 15 years. Amongst others, he was the master and captain of one of the world's largest refrigerated cross-ocean carriers (reefer ships). Besides refrigerated transportation, he also directed or operated car carriers, oil tankers, container ships, ice-class general cargocarriers, timber carriers and others.

Between 2008 and 2012 Capt. Kohli contributed through professional executive roles as the prime mover in one of the largest logistics and distribution companies in India and later for the integration of the largest logistics & supply chain infrastructure enterprises, heading the development of solutions to drive a pan-national footprint of India's first set of Free Trade Zones.

In 2012 he was asked by the Government of India to help incubate the National Centre for Cold-chain Development (NCCD) as its Chief Advisor. He agreed to provide such service pro bono for one year. However, shortly thereafter, this body was restructured and in 2014, he was appointed on tenure as its founding Chief Executive Officer. He was then accorded entitlements equivalent to those of Joint Secretary in Government of India. He continued as the CEO of NCCD until demitting office in 2020. In this period, he concurrently served as the Chief Advisor to the Agriculture Ministry to guide initiatives related to post harvest management and agricultural supply chain. Nevertheless, with onset of COVID-19, he continued to support, through ad hoc advice, on various assessments in regards to vaccine distribution.

At NCCD, Kohli had key involvement in rationalizing and revising the cold chain support mechanism and various other related schemes to promote and encourage cold chain development. He also was prime mover in establishing a historic MoU of cooperation in cold chain between nodal Indian and French organisations. He was the French Government's guest of honor and represented India at the International Conference on Sustainable Cold Chain in Paris (April 2013). In July 2015 he was invited as a global expert to speak on the Global Food Crisis at the House of Lords in UK. He was regularly invited to lecture at the national academy for Indian administration services and the National Defence College from 2017 to 2022.

Kohli was a member of various national committees and councilor to industry organisations and is chairman of the national Committee on Supply chain and Logistics, the first such committee set up with a focus on the supply chain by the government. He also co-chaired committees on Human Resource Development and Research & Development for cold chain. He was the principal member of the Indian government's Committee for Doubling Farmers' Income, set up in 2016, where his innovative percepts provoked a paradigm shift in how agricultural supply chain systems are understood. He has authored a number of policy documents and a key contributor to many game changing policies in the cold chain domain. His status as a thought leader is acknowledged in various Task Forces and Committees on agricultural marketing and logistics. The various critical revisions he brought to the country's policies on cold chain and Acts in respect to agri-logistics. His actions inspired the National Archives to place the history of the yet fledgling NCCD on record, in 2018.

In 2018, the University of Birmingham conferred Kohli the title of Honorary Professor. After leading NCCD for eight years, on 31 January 2020, Kohli demitted office of CEO of NCCD and resigned from position of Chief Advisor to Department of Agriculture & Farmers Welfare of India. After demitting office, Kohli has been Senior Advisor to the Asian Development Bank and as Senior Advisor to the United Nations to guide initiatives in their Environment Programme and for cold chain development that focuses on uplifting smallholder farmers. He was also among those who provided relevant strategies, during the Covid19 pandemic, for vaccine distribution.

== Honors and awards ==
In December 2010 he was acknowledged in his individual capacity, as the "Cold Chain Personality of the Year" by an expert panel hosted by KPMG-Supply Chain Leadership Council. The award was in appreciation for individual contributions to the industry and for aligning focus on the socio-economic fabric in India.

In 2012 he was applauded with the "Exemplary Thought Leadership Award" by the ICE Centre of Excellence in India. In 2014 he won the prestigious Agribusiness Leadership Award at the annual Agriculture Leadership Summit in New Delhi. In 2016, ISHRAE lauded him as honorary lifetime member, their first ever. He is expert member of the Empowered Committee in the Ministry of New & Renewable Energy for implementation of Montreal Protocol and on the Global Advisory Committee of the International Solar Alliance (ISA)

In India, he is recognised as one among the few eminent persons from the private sector who have shifted over to public service by taking on specialist advisory roles in government. His authored documents are frequently cited in the cold chain domain. He is recipient of various recognition and achievement awards from the cold chain industry in India.
