= Air Force Bal Bharati School =

Senior secondary school in New Delhi, India

Coordinates: 28.5913°N 77.2269°E

Air Force Bal Bharati School (AFBBS) established 1955, is a senior secondary school situated on Lodi Road, New Delhi, India, and run by the Indian Air Force Educational and Cultural Society. It is affiliated to the Central Board of Secondary Education.

== History ==
The school was the brainchild of Air Marshal M. S. Chaturvedi who encountered problems trying to get his children admitted to a school in New Delhi while he was posted there with the Air Force. The school was started by the Indian Air Force Educational and Cultural Society, which also runs The Air Force School (Suboroto Park) and Air Force Golden Jubilee Institute, with the aim of educating children of Air Force personnel posted to the National Capital Region. AFBBS made its beginning as a primary school, on 15 July 1955 with 116 students and six staff members. The school was housed in war time barracks.

By 1974 it had expanded to a senior secondary school with 3300 students. Today, AFBBS functions under the Indian Air Force Educational and Cultural Society as a private school. The school is affiliated to the Central Board of Secondary Education, New Delhi, and offers educational facilities under 10+2 scheme of education.

In the mid 1990s in an India Today survey the school was listed in the top 10 schools of New Delhi, rising to first in 1995. Various agencies have since ranked it in top 10 or top 15 lists.

In October 2005, the school celebrated its golden jubilee with a week-long festival, "Swarnajyoti", with inter-school competitions. In 2007 AFBBS achieved ISO 9001-2000 certification.

In 2012 Air Marshal J. N. Burma at the school's annual day stated that as per Indian Air Force computer records, results of the school's students are the highest in all schools run by the Indian Air Force.

The President of India, Shri Ram Nath Kovind attended the 2022 investiture ceremony, and congratulated members of the student council.

== Co-curricular activities ==
The school has multiple activities and is an active participant in the annual football tournament Subroto Cup

The school also has a NCC company, under the Air Force wing, consisting of both SD and SW, falling under the Delhi Directorate.

== Evaluation System – Senior Wing ==
A student has to put in at least 75% attendance during the year to become eligible to appear for the Board Examination/Annual Examination. There are two Terminal Examinations. In order to be declared as 'Passed' at the end of the academic session, a student must secure at least 40% marks in each of the subjects offered.

In the Secondary and Senior Secondary (X and XII) students who appear in the Board Examinations at the end of the year will appear in the Pre-Board Examinations to be held in January. They will take Two Terminal Examinations like the other students.

For admission and allotment of streams in Class XI the results of the Class X Board Examination will be taken into consideration.

== Evaluation System – Junior Wing ==
In the Junior school the continuous evaluation system is used where students are graded throughout the year on the basis of class work, assessments, projects and activities.

== Alumni ==
The School has an Alumni network, with its alumnus winning laurels, national and international, some also being the first(s) in their field(s). The alumnus network is spearheaded by the Old Students Association, standing by the side of their Alma Mater.
