= National Centre for Cold-chain Development =

Indian think tank

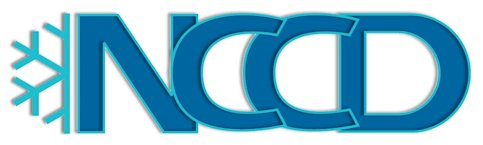
- Abbreviation: NCCD
- Formation: February 9, 2012
- Type: Autonomous PPP Body
- Legal status: Society
- Headquarters: New Delhi
- Location: Sector-18, Gurugram
- Origins: Public Private Partnership
- Region served: India
- Members: Government & Private
- Chief Executive Officer: Dr. B.N.S. Murthy (Horticulture Commissioner) (2020- )
- Director: Rajbir Singh, Joint Secretary (DAC) (2019- )
- Chief Operating Officer: Sh. Asheesh Fotedar (2012–2020)
- Founding Director: Shailender Kumar (2012–2013)
- Main organ: Technical Committees
- Website: nccd.gov.in
- Remarks: Presided by Secretary, Department of Agriculture & Farmers Welfare, India. Founding President - Ashish Bahuguna (2012–2015)

The National Centre for Cold-chain Development (NCCD) is an autonomous think tank body established by the Government of India with an agenda to positively impact and promote the development of the cold-chain sector in the country. NCCD was registered under the Society Registration Act, 1860 and given sanction by the Union Cabinet of India on 9 February 2012 in a session chaired by the country's Prime Minister.

== History ==
India is one of the largest producers of agricultural products and one of the global leaders in the pharmaceutical sector. Yet, it is known to have a fledgling cold-chain, which results in supply chain losses of food and other resources. These losses have been stated to be as high as USD 8 to 15 billion per annum from the agriculture sector alone. To address this concern, the government had earlier constituted a National Task Force on Cold-chain in 2008. This task force was discharged in 2010 on completing its mandate and in its report recommended that a dedicated institute be established to promote and coordinate various cold-chain initiatives undertaken by different government arms and the private industry. Cold chains are common in the food and pharmaceutical industries and also some chemical shipments.

The Government of India is one of the driving forces in developing the cold-chain industry and supports private participation through various subsidy schemes and grants. Investment in cold-chain in India was also opened under the automatic route for 100% FDI participation. The existing cold-chain in India largely comprised (in 2010) of comparatively small private companies with a regional or local footprint. Most of the earlier infrastructure developed to service the cold-chain needs of the country was focused on the storage of potato. While this specific produce is not native to India and is harvested only once only during winter, the success of cold-chain intervention has made potatoes available all through the year and is now considered part of the country's staple diet.

In the previous two decades, India has been developing at a quick pace and an increasing demand for high-value foods with a shift towards horticultural crops has been documented. This, coupled with rapid urbanisation resulted in multi-fold changes to the spending and consumption pattern of India's population. The existing food supply chain systems were unable to cope with these fast-changing demographic trends and the lack of efficient and effective supply chains is understood to lead to a variety of losses in the perishable food segment. In 2012, Indian farmers produced 240 million metric tonnes of horticultural produce, almost equal to its grain and cereals production. Various reports indicated that 18% to 40% of this produce was lost due to supply chain inefficiencies, concluding that a focused effort was required to promote the development of the cold-chain in the country.

The Indian government and its Planning Commission spelt out clear intention, that cold-chain has to be supported. Amongst the core identified development areas are the base infrastructure, environmentally friendly technologies, standards, and protocols, enabling policies and specialised skills.

== Organisation ==
NCCD is overseen by a Governing Council and an Executive Committee, with equal representation of public and private sectors, chaired by the Secretary (A&C, Ministry of Agriculture). The principal executive of this body was originally conceived as its Director who would implement the decisions of the Executive Body. The first Director of NCCD was Mr. Sanjeev Chopra, a Joint Secretary in the Ministry of Agriculture. However, in keeping with the technical domain requirements, the governing bodies initially decided to invite an established leader from the private sector as a chief advisor to assist in incubating the body and develop a roadmap. In this initial stage, various concept level revisions were proposed regarding cold chain and the requirements to make it future ready. In these years, India's horticultural production also overtook that in food grains.

Subsequently, in 2014 the Governing Council decided that this body required to be strengthened with relevant domain expertise. It restructured the organization and added the position of Chief Executive Officer, to be filled by an industry stalwart with hands-on domain experience. The government officer nominated Director, was thereafter to provide administration support, with the professional Chief Executive Officer responsible to provide executive and technical direction. Capt. Pawanexh Kohli was the first Chief Advisor and the founding Chief Executive Officer of NCCD and headed this organization for its first eight years from 2012 to 2020.

During this period, the first CEO also served in an individual capacity as Chief Advisor to the Department of Agriculture and Farmers Welfare on supply chain and post-harvest management in India. NCDD was involved in government discussions on Agri-logistics and cold chain development.

NCCD think tank has participation from various private & government stakeholders ranging from Educational & Research Institutions, Regulatory authorities, Trade bodies, individual Companies involved as users or providers of cold-chain, farmer Groups and Associations as well as Individuals as Associate members. NCCD comprises members from the cold-chain stakeholders community and administered by its office secretariat staff. Each such member group also elects representation on the governing council, enabling NCCD to reflect inclusive governance and emulate a public-private partnership model. As of February 2020, Dr BNS Murthy (a government officer and the Horticulture Commissioner of India), has been nominated to the role of Chief Executive Officer.

=== Technical committees ===
NCCD has constituted the following technical committees which include industry leaders as its members.

- Training, HRD and R&D Committee.
- Committee for Strengthening Supply Chain & Logistics.
- Application of Non-conventional Energy Sources in Cold Chain Infrastructure.
- Technical Specification, Standards, Test Laboratory and Product Certification Committee.

These committees contribute towards this nodal body's functioning along its road-map.

=== Tasks ===
NCCD is tasked with objectives of national importance which include,

1. Serve as a think tank to the government on the subject of cold-chain. NCCD engages with its members to translate industry needs into policy recommendation.
2. Provide an enabling environment for cold chain sector and facilitate private investment for cold-chain infrastructure.
3. Direction setting to narrow the gap in the supply and value chain including storage, specialised transport and operational or business processes.
4. Address the concerns on standards and protocols related to cold-chain testing, verification, certification and accreditation.
5. Assist in developing and promoting new and energy efficient technologies and their adaption in India.
6. Capacity building and training activities to reduce the gap in skilled human resources required for cold-chain sector.
7. Recommend guidelines to minimise environment impact and promote sustainability in the cold-chain.
8. Awareness programs on best practices for perishable product handling, indigenised for specific requirements and conditions.

In India, while almost 15% of fruits and vegetables have access to cold storage capacity, less than 5% of such goods are precooled or get transported in the cold-chain. This results in most of the fresh produce being subject to harsh climatic conditions, incurring gross loss of perishable food items. Similar lack of cold-chain in the pharmaceutical sector witnesses increased risk and loss of medical products. Lack of appropriate integrated infrastructure in this sector also increases risk to frozen foods shipments. Despite being a large food producer globally, this disallows the supply chain to support India's aspirations to better serve its domestic population and increase its share in global food trade. NCCD is intended to address all segments and the developmental aspects of cold-chain.

== International Cooperation ==
NCCD participates in global activities on matters of agri-logistics and food loss and waste. In 2013, Capt. Pawanexh Kohli, then head of NCCD, represented India as the Guest of Honour at the International Summit on Sustainability and cold chain in France, when NCCD also signed an MoU with Cemafroid.

NCCD's first CEO was also invited for a debate at UK's House of Lords in 2015 and as expert to UK's Policy Commission on Cold Economy. That same year, NCCD's CEO co-chaired Working Groups on Food Loss and Food Waste at the International Action Summit held in The Hague. Under the authorship of its founding CEO, NCCD published India's minimum system standards and guidelines for cold chain infrastructure. NCCD also conducted the country's first ever cold chain infrastructure assessment, which thereafter formed the basis for future strategies in India. In 2016, NCCD was designated a knowledge partner of India's inter-ministerial Committee for Doubling Farmers' Income, with its CEO as a member of this historic Committee.

NCCD has undertaken projects to demonstrate the efficiency of cold chain in connecting farmers with markets across India's sub-continental distances. Such projects also documented higher incomes for farmers and lower food losses and carbon footprint of the supply chain. Another initiative by NCCD is that of bringing synergistic uses to village level refrigerated pack-houses so as to benefit social and welfare needs of rural communities. In 2019, NCCD became the knowledge partner for the International Solar Alliance to help foster solar energy used in cold chains in its UN member countries. Through NCCD, various myths about India's cold storage sector were rectified and it brought about a paradigm shift in policies.

NCCD was awarded the Agribusiness Leadership Award in India in 2014. In 2018, in recognition of the individual contributions of then CEO of NCCD, the University of Birmingham conferred him the title of honorary Professor. Through five technical committees constituted under NCCD, various domain experts within the country are also able to contribute in the works undertaken by NCCD. These include training in cold chain operations, workshops to encourage policy level interface between decision makers in government and operators, as well as knowledge dissemination through capacity building and awareness programmes. NCCD is recognized as the nodal body for cold chain development in India and for its unique construct, as an ecosystem of public and private sector stakeholders that serves to provide the country context relevant direction for its initiatives to develop cold chain for its agricultural sector.
