= Anoop Malhotra =

Retired Indian army officer

Anoop Malhotra (born 1955, in Nainital, India) is a retired Lt General of the Indian Army.

== Early life and education ==
Anoop Malhotra is the son of Colonel A. P. Malhotra and Nand Rani Malhotra (Nando) and nephew of Prem Nath Sahni. He is the youngest of the three sons of Nando the other two being Dr. Ashok Malhotra and Deepak Malhotra who currently lives in Spain and is a British National. He did his early schooling at The Air Force School (Subroto Park) of New Delhi before he was selected to the National Defence Academy (India) for a career in the army.

== Career in Artillery ==
Malhotra was commissioned into the Artillery in 1974. He has completed Advance Gunnery and Long Gunnery Staff Courses at the School of Artillery Deolali; Armament Technology Course at IAT (now DIAT), Girinagar, Pune; Defence Services Staff College Course at Wellington, and the Senior Command Course at College of Combat, Mhow.

While with the Army from 1974 to 1995, Malhotra served in field, medium, light and mountain regiments of the Indian Artillery. He has also had exposures as ADC to GOC of an Infantry Division and Brigade Major of both Infantry and Artillery Brigades. He commanded 312 Field Regiment in the Jammu and Kashmir state when insurgency was at its peak, and "earned many accolades for his service".

During his Command, the Regiment was awarded with the Chief of Army Staffs Unit Commendation in 1995 for Counter Insurgency Operations in the Valley; the first Artillery Regiment to be so awarded in the history of the Indian Army.

== Career in Defence Research and Development ==
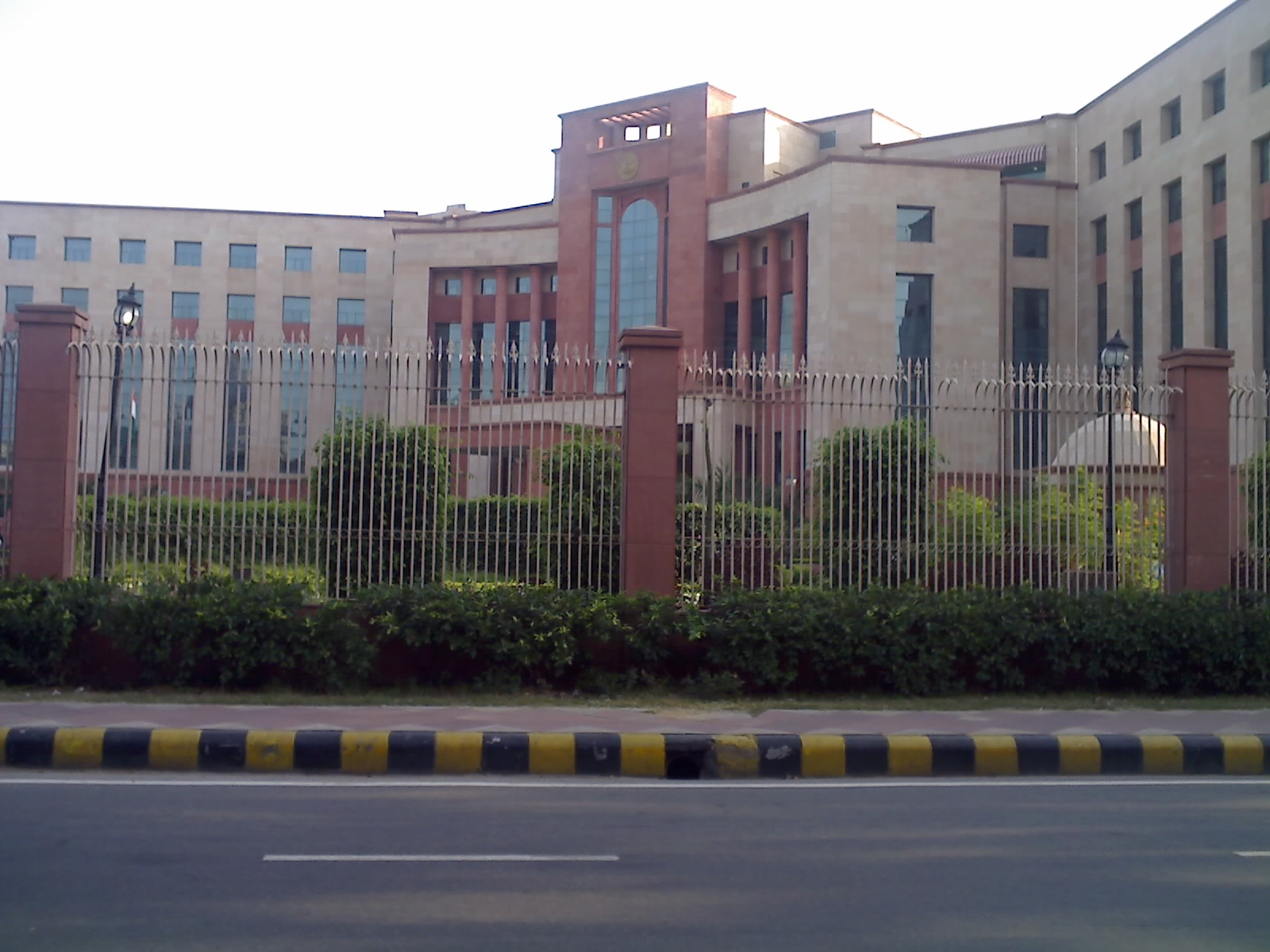
DRDO Headquarters at New Delhi

As a Brigadier, he headed a DRDO Project Site at Nasik for five years until 2005. His work here was dedicated to fulfilling the Indian treaty obligations under the aegis of the Organisation for the Prohibition of Chemical Weapons (OPCW) at The Hague, Netherlands. During this period, the Project Site successfully fulfilled the Treaty obligations of the country, well ahead of the internationally mandated time lines.

As a Major General, he was Director of Proof & Experimental Establishment (PXE), Balasore, from August 2007 to September 2009 and was actively involved in T&E of Armaments; a discipline that lies in his area of interest, being from the Indian Artillery. At Chandipur-on-sea (Orissa), the oldest laboratory of the Defence Research and Development Organisation (DRDO) in India, Malhotra oversaw the development and testing of several indigenously developed ammunitions for the Indian Army.

Malhotra was promoted to the rank of Lt General in August 2011 and later joined DRDO HQ as Chief Controller R&D (R&M) in January 2012. Malhotra took over additional charge of CC R&D (Implementation) at Defence Research & Development Organisation Headquarters in New Delhi, India from 1 June 2012.

Malhotra has contributed in areas outside of armaments. He provided utmost support for the sustainable development of the Ladakh region, especially farming. In 2013, Malhotra served on a high level committee created on the direction of the then Defence Minister to investigate corruption in recruitment of scientists at DRDO.

He retired from service in April 2015 and now lives in Pune, India.
