= Jesus and Mary College =

Women's college of University of Delhi, India

Coordinates: 28.59437°N 77.17828°E

- Motto: "Thou art light, fill me with thy light"
- Type: Public
- Established: 1968; 58 years ago
- Academic affiliations: University of Delhi
- Principal: Sr. Molly K. A.
- Location: New Delhi, India
- Campus: Urban
- Website: www.jmc.ac.in

Jesus and Mary College (JMC) is a women-only college of the University of Delhi located in New Delhi, India. The college offers bachelor's degrees in Commerce, Arts, and Mathematics. The college offers honours degrees in Elementary Education, History, Sociology, Political Science, Vocational Studies, Hindi, English, Economics, Psychology, Mathematics, and Commerce. The college is located in the Chanakyapuri diplomatic enclave in New Delhi, adjacent to Maitreyi College.

Due to the construction of Pink Line, Jesus and Mary College is quite accessible via Delhi Metro. The nearest metro station is Durgabai Deshmukh South Campus metro station which is around 1 km from the college.

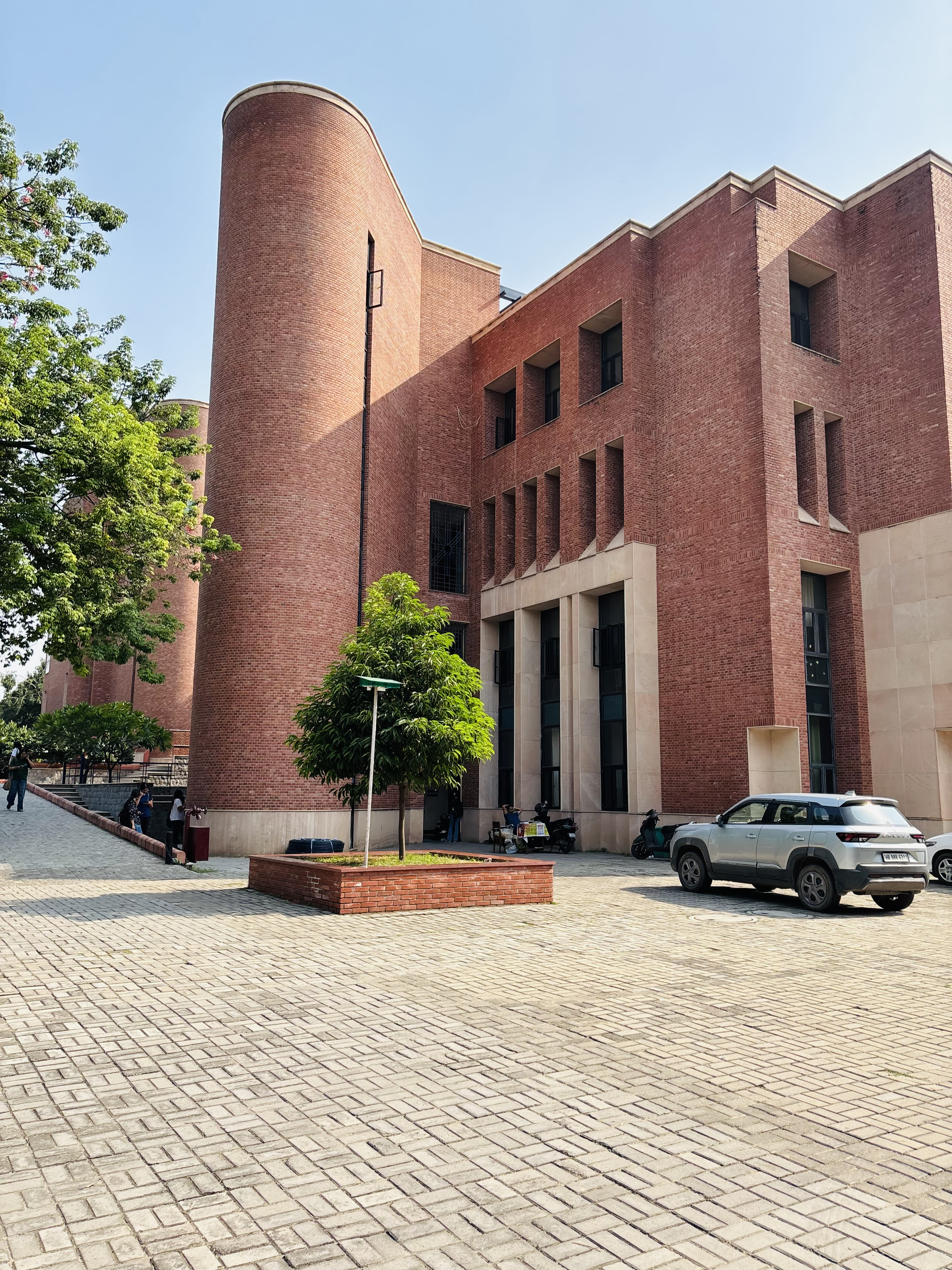
Jesus and Mary College, New Delhi

== History ==
The college was founded by Religious of Jesus and Mary, a Roman Catholic congregation founded by St. Claudine Thevenet or known as Mary of St. Ignatius (1774–1837) in Lyon, France, in 1818. The Convent of Jesus and Mary, Delhi was established in 1919, and thereafter a college for women in Delhi and the college was founded in July 1968. At the time of opening, the college offered only two degrees: English (Hons.) and BA (Pass), but quickly expanded to offer degrees in other subjects.

Jesus and Mary College is one of the few colleges in the University of Delhi whose student body is not affiliated with Delhi University Students Union (DUSU).

== Academics ==
=== Rankings ===
College rankings

General – India
- NIRF (Colleges) (2023): 38

The college is ranked 38th among colleges in India by the National Institutional Ranking Framework (NIRF) in 2024.

College Dunia ranks it at 6th among the Best Arts Colleges in Delhi and at 13th among the Best Arts Colleges in India.

India Today ranked it at 11th among the Best Arts Colleges in India in 2024.

=== Admission ===
The admission to the college is based on CUET score . The college does not reserve any seats for Scheduled Caste and Scheduled Tribe (SC/ST) candidates. As a minority institution, the college also has a 50% reservation for Catholic or other Christian students.

=== Courses ===
Undergraduate courses:

- Bachelor of Arts (Hons.) in Economics, English, Hindi, History, Political Science, Psychology, Sociology
- B.A. Programme: Discipline Subject Combination
- Bachelor of Commerce (Hons.)
- Bachelor of Commerce
- Bachelor of Science (Hons.) Mathematics
- Bachelor of Elementary Education (4 Years Course)
- Bachelor of Vocational Studies (B.Voc:-Health care Management & B.Voc:-Retail Management & IT)

(Note: All undergraduate degree courses except B.El.Ed shall be taught in three years, semester mode)

Postgraduate courses:

- Master of Arts—English
- Master of Arts—Hindi

=== Projects ===
Student involvement in projects as part of curriculum is given below:

- Departments like B.El.Ed. (IIIrd year) and Psychology have 100% student involvement in in-house projects over the past four years.
- The Department of Economics has 83% of its students work as interns in institutions and companies like DMRC, Ernst and Young, German National Tourists Services, HUDCO, King's College London, Lucid Solutions, the Planning Commission, Reliance Securities, Smilyo, Toxics Link, United Nations Projects. The department has also worked with NGOs like Kalpavriksha and Samavesh.
- The Department of English has 100% student involvement in in-house projects related to academic topics of English.

== Student life ==
=== Societies ===
Sources:

- The Electoral Literacy Club
- 180 Degree Consulting
- All India Catholic University Federation
- Cauldron, the English Magazine Society
- Curiosus, the English Quiz Society
- Dastaan - the art and architecture society
- E-Cell, The Entrepreneurship Cell
- Echo, the western music society
- Enactus
- English Debating Society
- Estrategia: The Case Study Cell
- Internal Complaints Committee
- The Equal Opportunity Cell
- Ethnic Eight, the Northeast society
- Finance and Investment Cell
- Global Youth JMC Chapter
- Green Society
- Iris, the Fine Arts Society
- Jesus and Mary College Education Programme
- JMC-MUN Society
- Kahkasha, Hindi Dramatics society
- Karwaan, the mental health awareness society
- Management Interaction Cell
- Manthan- Hindi debating society
- Mercatus, the Marketing Society
- The Mercurian Times
- Mudra, the Western Dance society
- National Cadet Corp
- National Service Scheme
- National Sports Organisation
- Neev, Training and Development Centre
- Panorama, the film-making and film appreciation society
- Peace Society
- The Photography Society
- Puzzle society
- Sunny Mugs, the Poetry Society
- Tarannum - Indian culture society
- Troubadours, the English theatre society
- Women's Study Centre

== Notable alumni ==
Notable alumni of Jesus and Mary college include:

- Ambika Anand, TV anchor (NDTV Good Times)
- Naimi Aziz, Tanzanian ambassador
- Manika Batra, Indian table tennis player
- Apurvi Chandela, Indian shooter
- Neha Dhupia, Bollywood Actress, model and Miss India Universe 2002
- Tanvir Gill (Commerce Department): News Anchor at CNBC
- Namita Gokhale, writer
- Hasleen Kaur, Bollywood Actress, model and Miss India Earth 2011
- Nistula Hebbar, journalist and political correspondent
- Ankita Shorey, model and Miss India International 2011
- Priyanka Gandhi Vadra, politician, daughter of the former Prime Minister Rajiv Gandhi
- Ampareen Lyngdoh, politician
- Sushmita Mukherjee, TV & movie actress
- B. V. Nagarathna, judge of the Hon'ble Supreme Court of India, in line to become the first female Chief Justice of India in 2027
- Aneet Padda, film actress
- Pratika Rawal, cricketer
- Usha Sanyal, historian
- Rini Simon Khanna, news anchor
- Rakul Preet Singh, film actress and Femina Miss India-Miss India People's Choice 2011
- Simone Singh, film actress (popular for TV show, Ek Hasina Thi)
- Sandali Sinha, film actress
- Radhika Madan, actress, Professional Dancer
- Safoora Zargar, student activist.
- Sangeeta Kumari Singh Deo (1979–81): Member of the National Executive, BJP, Member of Parliament from Bolangir, Odisha in the 12th Lok Sabha 1998–99, 13th Lok Sabha 1999–04, 14th Lok Sabha 2004–09.
- Prachi Tehlan, former captain of India national netball team
- Ganieve Kaur Majithia, MLA from Majitha, Punjab

== General bibliography ==
- Blaze The Uprising! (PDF). Smilyo Educational Charitable Society. 2014. Archived from the original (PDF) on 19 June 2020.
