= Air Force Golden Jubilee Institute =

Coordinates: 28.5821°N 77.1485°E

Air Force Golden Jubilee Institute, Subroto Park, New Delhi, India
- Subroto Park, New Delhi, Delhi; India

Information
- Type: Private Special Education school [Special Wing] and Inclusive School [General Wing]
- Motto: विद्या विन्दते अमृतम; Sanskrit: Vidya Vindate Amritam, lit. 'Knowledge is Everlasting'
- Established: 1985
- Principal: Mrs Alka Singh
- Faculty: 173
- Grades: Class UKG - 12
- Campus size: 0.1 acres
- Affiliation: CBSE
- Website: www.afgji.in

Air Force Golden Jubilee Institute, located at Subroto Park, Delhi Cantonment, India, is a school run by the Indian Air Force Educational and Cultural Society. It was founded in 1985.

The school has an auditorium named as Rabindralaya. There are three separate 'wings' in the school. The Special wing is dedicated special education school of special needs. The Junior wing has classes Kindergarten to V. The Senior wing has classes VI to XII.

The school was established primarily for the benefit of children of Indian Air Force personnel. It is open to children of Non Air Force category also from other defence Army and Navy personnel as well as gives admissions to CWSN from civilians background. The Air Force Golden Jubilee Institute is a co-educational public school.

The school, and its sister schools, Air Force Bal Bharati School and The Air Force School are run by the Indian Air Force Educational and Cultural Society.

== History ==
On completion of Golden Jubilee Year of Indian Air Force, this Institute established in 1985. It started as a Special school [Special Wing] for children with special needs. The school was extended and made a public school the following year.

== Academics ==
The institution follows the Central Board of Secondary Education curriculum and is affiliated to the same with the medium of instruction as English. At the time of admission, in consultation with the trained physician/psychologist, counselor, special educators and social workers, children are placed in mildly, moderately and severely retarded categories. This helps to assess their chronological and mental ages and levels of abilities from age groups of 6 to 18 years.

Progress is monitored through Individualized Education Plans in which long-term and short-term goals are defined and methods are adopted to achieve these goals. The academic program consists of reading/writing simple arithmetic of Primary level, environmental awareness and home management program. The Integrated Program consists of drawing, music, dance, creative art and craft, physical training, morning assemblies, special-assemblies on special days like Christmas, Diwali, school annual day, annual sports day and visits of eminent persons.

Vocational training is provided to the special students in fields of home management, paper products, printing, Xeroxing, weaving, candle-making and computers. Teacher and student volunteers work with these students and help them in their endeavor.

The school is a member of the National Progressive School Conference. It is also a member of the Indian Public Schools Conference.

== Notable alumni ==
- Sushmita Sen, ex-Miss India and Miss Universe, movie star and celebrity.
- Chirag Paswan, Leader of Lok Janshakti Party (Ram Vilas)
- Priya Saroj, Member of Parliament from Machhlishahr
- Shaili Chopra, senior editor and Primetime Anchor at ET Now
- Himanshu Malik, actor
- Pariva Pranati, TV actress
- Anchal Singh, TV actress

== See also ==
- Air Force School Coimbatore
- Air Force Bal Bharati School, Lodi Road
- The Air Force School (Subroto Park)
