= Pariva Pranati =

Indian television actress (born 1983)

Pariva Pranati Sachdev
- Born: Pariva Sinha; 18 March 1983 (age 43); Patna, Bihar, India
- Occupation: Actress
- Years active: 2005–present
- Known for: Hamari Sister Didi; Ek Doosre Se Karte Hain Pyaar Hum; Ishq Kills; Wagle Ki Duniya – Nayi Peedhi Naye Kissey
- Spouse: Puneet Sachdev (m. 2014)

Pariva Pranati is an Indian actress who mainly appears in Hindi soap operas. She has acted in Vaada Raha and With Love, Delhi. Most recently, she was playing Amrita in the series Hamari Sister Didi. She recently starred as Vandana Wagle in Wagle Ki Duniya – Nayi Peedhi Naye Kissey on Sony SAB.

== Personal life ==
Pariva was born as Pariva Sinha in Patna in a Bihari Hindu family. Her father Prabhat Sinha is a retired Air Force officer. She is an alumna of Air Force Golden Jubilee Institute and Lady Shri Ram College in Delhi. Pariva now resides in Mumbai.

Pariva married actor and wildlife photographer Puneet Sachdev at a private ceremony in Gwalior on Valentine's Day (14 February) in 2014. The couple had a baby boy on 9 May 2017.

== Filmography ==
=== Films ===
Year	Show	Role
2009	Vaada Raha	Rosy
2011	With Love, Delhi!	Priyanka Khanna
2012	Talaash: The Answer Lies Within	Soniya Kapoor

=== Television ===
Year	Show	Role
2005	Hotel Kingston	
2005–2006	Bhabhi	Alpa
2007	Don	
2007	Ssshhhh... Phir Koi Hai	Sanjana
2007–2008	Virrudh	Sandhya Vedant Raisinghania
2007–2008	Tujko Hai Salaam Zindgi	Manya Sharma
2008–2009	Hamari Betiyoon Ka Vivaah	Trishna Kohli
2010–2011	Armanon Ka Balidaan – Aarakshan	Sumidha
2012	Ek Doosre Se Karte Hain Pyaar Hum	Susheela Binoychandra Majumdar
2013	Savdhaan India	Kavita
2014	Ishq Kills	Neena Rudra Pratap Singh
2014	Halla Bol	Sneha
2014–2015	Hamari Sister Didi	Amrita
2015	Laut Aao Trisha	Mallika
2016	Box Cricket League 2	Contestant
2016	Badi Door Se Aaye Hai	Premlata
2016	Khidki	Nandini Aloknath Tripathi
2021–2025	Wagle Ki Duniya – Nayi Peedhi Naye Kissey	Vandana "Vandu" Sinha Wagle

== Awards and nominations ==
Year	Award	Show	Category	Result
2022	21st Indian Television Academy Awards	Wagle Ki Duniya – Nayi Peedhi Naye Kissey	Best Actress – Comedy TV	Won
2022	21st Indian Television Academy Awards	Wagle Ki Duniya – Nayi Peedhi Naye Kissey	Best Actress – Comedy (Popular) TV	Nominated

== See also ==
- Air Force Golden Jubilee Institute alumni
