= Nistula Hebbar =

Indian journalist at The Hindu (born 1975)

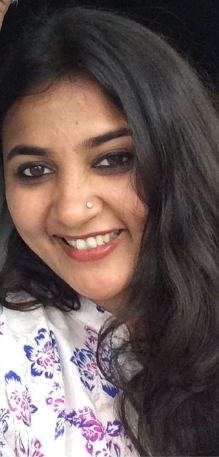
- Born: 17 March 1975 (age 51); Delhi, India
- Education: Jesus and Mary College, Delhi University, Delhi school of economics
- Occupations: Book author, columnist
- Years active: 2000–present
- Known for: Author of "Kiss and Tell "

Nistula Hebbar is an Indian journalist and author.

== Early life and education ==
She is from Mangalore and was born and brought up in Delhi. She studied Sociology at the Jesus and Mary College, University of Delhi and Delhi School of Economics.

== Career ==
Hebbar has been a journalist since 2000. She currently works as the political editor at The Hindu. She previously worked for The Times of India, The Economic Times, and The Financial Express in New Delhi.

Hebbar wrote a book titled Kiss and Tell in 2012. She contributed to two books, Cabals and Kings (edited by Aditi Phadnis) and The Lives of Muslims in India (edited by Abdul Shaban). In the latter, her essay deals with the Bharatiya Janata Party's engagement with Muslims.
