= With Love, Delhi! =

- Directed by: Nikhil Singh
- Screenplay by: Nikhil Singh
- Story by: Ashish Lal and Nikhil Singh
- Produced by: Manav Vigg Ashutosh Matela Ashish Lal
- Starring: Ashish Lal; Pariva Pranati; Tom Alter; Seema Biswas; Kiran Kumar
- Cinematography: Sethu Sriram
- Edited by: Namrata Rao
- Music by: Sanjoy Chowdhury
- Production company: RedMat Reves Films Pvt. Ltd.
- Distributed by: Mirchi Movies
- Release date: 16 December 2011
- Running time: 100 minutes
- Country: India
- Language: English

With Love, Delhi! is an English-language Indian film directed by Nikhil Singh and starring Ashish Lal, Pariva Pranati, Tom Alter, Seema Biswas, and Kiran Kumar. It was dubbed in Hindi by the actors.

== Plot ==
Khanna (Kiran Kumar), the biggest real estate developer in Delhi, is kidnapped by Ajay (Tom Alter), who claims to be a historian. To rescue Khanna, his daughter Priyanka (Pariva Pranati) has to solve cryptic historical clues pointing to monuments of Delhi. Her best friend and a history graduate, Ashish, joins her in this difficult mission.

== Cast ==
- Ashish Lal ... Ashish
- Pariva Pranati ... Priyanka Khanna
- Tom Alter ... Ajay
- Kiran Kumar ... Khanna
- Seema Biswas ... Mom of Ashish

== Soundtrack ==
The music is composed by Sanjoy Chowdhury. The film has two Hindi songs and both are directed by Ashutosh Matela. The choreographers are Amit Verlani and Gaurav Ahlawat. The singers are Shaan, Sarika and Suraj Jagan. The lyricist is Amitabh Verma.
