= Naimi Aziz =

Tanzanian ambassador

Naimi Sweetie Hamza Aziz
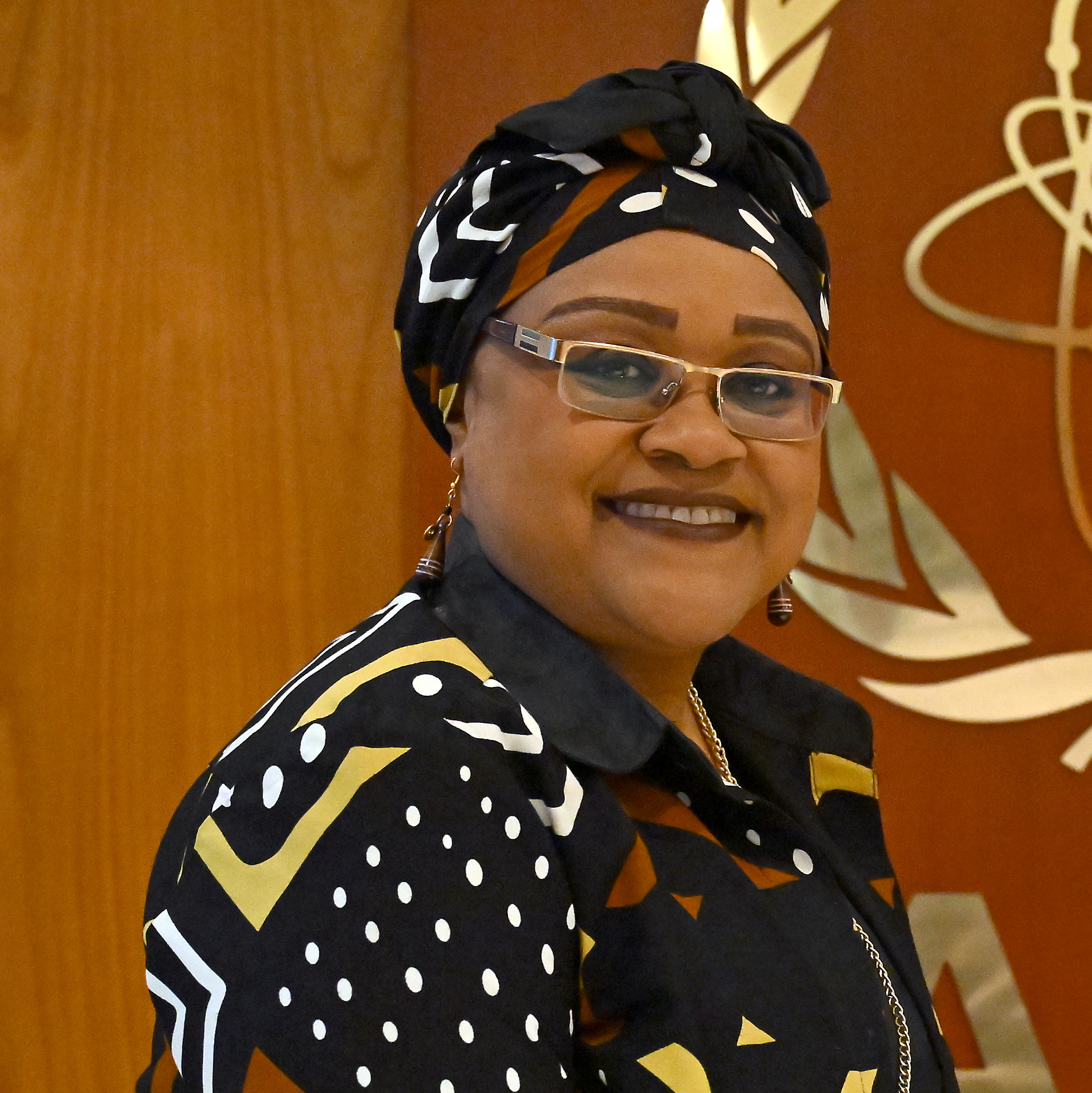
- in 2024
- Born: 12 January 1966 (age 60)
- Occupation: diplomat
- Known for: Tanzanian ambassador to the African Union and then organisations in Vienna
- Children: one

Naimi Sweetie Hamza Aziz (born 12 January 1966) has been the Tanzanian ambassador to the African Union and later to Austria. She was recalled by the President Magufuli in 2020 for alleged embezzlement. She was ambassador long after Magafuli died.

== Life ==
Aziz was born in 1966. She studied in India and graduated in political science from Jesus and Mary College, Delhi University. She later completed a master's degree in foreign affairs and trade in Australia at Monash University.

In 2000 she was in Belgium working at the embassy that was responsible for diplomacy with the European Union.

In 2013 she became an ambassador based in Addis Ababa. Her principal diplomatic mission was to Ethiopia and the African Union but she was also accredited to represent Tanzania in Djibouti, Yemen and the Economic Commission for Africa.

In 2020 she was recalled after a report alleged that her embassy was the site of embezzlement. President John Magufuli said that she was recalled as an example, but she completed her time as the ambassador to Ethiopia and to the African Union in 2020. Magufuli died in 2021 in office.

She became the ambassador to Austria, based in Vienna in 2023. She was appointed by the President Samia Suluhu Hassan. She is her country's representative to the United Nations in Vienna. In 2025 she and Tanzania were arguing for the peaceful use of nuclear technology.

== Private life ==
Aziz is single and she has a child.
