= Nikesh Arora =

Indian-American business executive (born 1968)

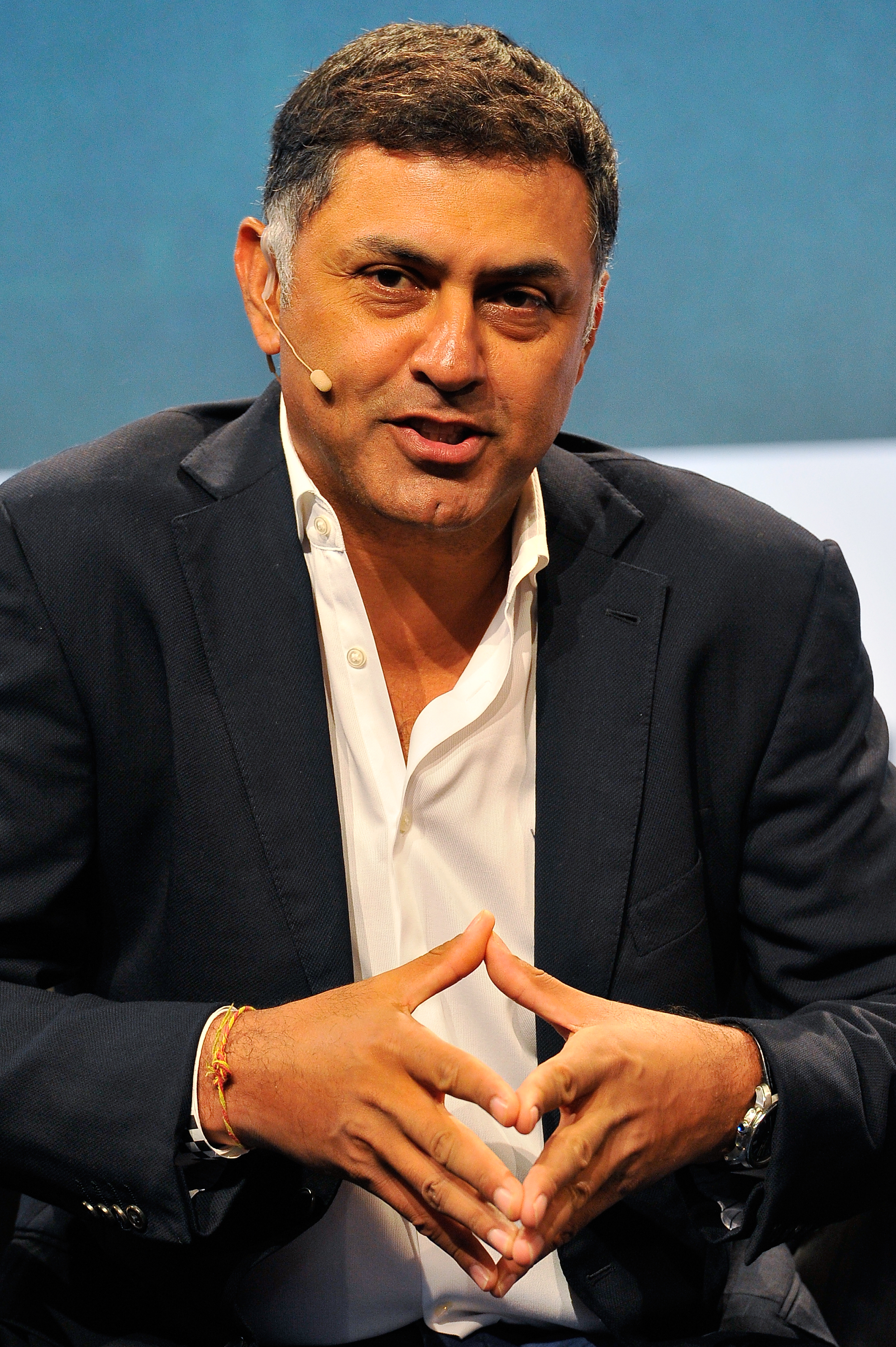
- Nikesh Arora in 2015
- Born: February 9, 1968 (age 58); Ghaziabad, Uttar Pradesh, India
- Education: IIT (BHU) Varanasi (BTech); Boston College (MS); Northeastern University (MBA)
- Occupations: CEO and chairman of Palo Alto Networks
- Spouse: Ayesha Thapar (m. 2014)
- Children: 3
- Family: Thapar family (by marriage)

Nikesh Arora (born February 9, 1968) is an Indian-American billionaire business executive. He is currently the chairman and chief executive officer of the American cybersecurity company Palo Alto Networks.

Arora was formerly a senior executive at Google and president of SoftBank Group from October 2014 to June 2016. According to the Bloomberg Billionaires Index, his net worth was estimated at $1.5 billion in early 2024.

Arora also serves on the board of directors of Uber and as a non-executive director of Richemont, where he was appointed lead independent director in April 2025.

== Early life ==
Nikesh Arora was born to a Punjabi family in Ghaziabad. His father is an Indian Air Force officer. Arora went to high school at The Air Force School. Because of his father's military postings, Arora's family moved frequently during his childhood, and he attended several Kendriya Vidyalaya schools across India. He completed the final two years of his secondary education at The Air Force School in New Delhi.

He graduated from the Indian Institute of Technology (BHU) Varanasi with a bachelor's degree in electrical engineering in 1989. He holds a M.S. degree in finance from Boston College and an MBA from Northeastern University. He has held the CFA designation since 1999.

== Career ==
=== Fidelity Investments ===
Arora began his career at Fidelity Investments in 1992, holding various positions in finance and technology management before becoming vice president of finance at Fidelity Technologies.

In April 1997, Arora joined Putnam Investments as a vice president, continuing his career in financial services before moving into the telecommunications industry.

=== T-Motion PLC ===
In 2000, Arora established T-Motion, a subsidiary within Deutsche Telekom. In 2002, T-Motion was integrated into T-Mobile's core services. From 2001 to 2004, Arora served as chief marketing officer of T-Mobile International, a division of Deutsche Telekom. As a member of T-Mobile Europe's management board, he oversaw product development, mobile devices, branding and marketing activities across its European operations.

=== Google ===
Arora joined Google in 2004. He held several senior leadership positions at Google, serving as vice president of European operations from 2004 to 2007, president of operations in Europe, the Middle East and Africa from 2007 to 2009, and president of global sales operations and business development from 2009 to 2010.

In January 2011, Arora was appointed Google's senior vice president and chief business officer. In this role, he oversaw the company's global sales and business operations, including advertising revenue, customer relationships, marketing and strategic partnerships. He was also involved in managing relationships with major advertisers and financial stakeholders. Arora left Google in 2014, resigning from the post of senior vice president and chief business officer.

=== SoftBank Corp. ===
Arora was president and chief operating officer of SoftBank Corp. from 2014 to 2016 receiving total compensation over $200 million, a Japanese record at the time.

Arora initially joined SoftBank in September 2014 as vice chairman and chief executive officer of its US-based investment and internet operations. In June 2015, he became a representative director of SoftBank. During his tenure, he was involved in the group's international investment strategy and its expansion into technology companies.

Arora stepped down from his executive and board positions in June 2016 following differences with Masayoshi Son over the timing of a leadership succession. Son had considered Arora a potential successor but decided to continue leading the company for a longer period. Arora subsequently took on an advisory role at SoftBank, effective 1 July 2016.

=== Palo Alto Networks ===
In June 2018, Arora became the CEO and chairman of Palo Alto Networks. Under Arora's leadership, Palo Alto Networks expanded its focus beyond individual cybersecurity products towards integrated security platforms. In February 2024, he announced a revised growth strategy, referred to as "platformization", aimed at encouraging customers to consolidate multiple security products within the company's ecosystem. The strategy involved accepting slower short-term growth in exchange for wider adoption of its integrated platforms.

In 2023, Arora's total compensation from Palo Alto Networks was $151.4 million, up 1,355% from the previous year and representing a CEO-to-median worker pay ratio of 735-to-1 for the company, as well as making Arora the fourth highest paid CEO in the U.S. that year. For 2024, Arora's total compensation was $58 million.

In July 2025, Palo Alto Networks announced an agreement to acquire Israeli cybersecurity company CyberArk in a cash-and-stock transaction valued at approximately $25 billion. Arora described the acquisition as part of the company's strategy to expand into identity security, particularly in response to the growing use of artificial intelligence and automated systems. The acquisition was completed on 11 February 2026, adding CyberArk's identity and privileged access management technologies to Palo Alto Networks' cybersecurity portfolio.

=== Other positions ===
Arora was chief marketing officer and a member of the management board at T-Mobile, Bharti Airtel, Europe and is a trustee at the Paley Center for Media in Los Angeles, California.

Since 2007, Arora has been a senior advisor to Silver Lake Partners, a private equity firm. From 2001 to 2004, he was chief marketing officer of the T-Mobile International Division of Deutsche Telekom AG. He was chief executive officer and founder of T-Motion PLC, which merged with T-Mobile International in 2002.

Arora has also worked for Deutsche Telekom and Putnam Investments.

Arora has been a board member of Sprint Corporation, Colgate-Palmolive and Yahoo! Japan. He was elected to the board of Uber in 2025.

Arora is also a member of The Business Council.

== Personal life ==
Arora has a daughter from his first marriage. His second marriage was to Ayesha Thapar, an Indian industrial heiress, in 2014. They have a son and a daughter.
