= Rini Simon Khanna =

Indian television news anchor (born 1964)

Rini Khanna
- Born: 4 October 1964 (age 61)
- Education: Indian Institute of Mass Communication, Jesus and Mary College, The Air Force School (Subroto Park)
- Occupations: News Anchor, Journalist
- Spouse: Deepak Khanna

Rini Khanna (born 1964) is an Indian television news anchor, who worked with state-run Doordarshan (1985 – 2001) which made her well known, and later started a career as voiceover professional and anchor person for various events. She started her career as a newscaster with All India Radio in 1982.

== Early life and education ==
Born to malayali parants Samuel Simon a IAF officer and Mary kutti, hails from konni Pathanamthitta Kerala. She studied in nine schools in Delhi, Halwara (Punjab), Mumbai, Jodhpur, Bagdogra, Tambaram and back in Delhi. She finished her schooling at the Air Force School at Subroto Park, Delhi in 1981. Thereafter she graduated in English literature from Jesus and Mary College, Delhi University, and did her post graduation in History and also did a PG diploma in Journalism from Indian Institute of Mass Communication (IIMC), New Delhi.

== Career ==
At 13, Khanna began producing and hosting programmes and interviews on India’s National Radio, All India Radio and was soon reading the primetime national news on All India Radio. In addition she does commentary on occasions including Independence day, Republic day etc. for television and radio.

She was handpicked from Radio to anchor the National news on Delhi Doordarshan, the premier Indian television channel in 1985, co-anchoring news with Tejeshwar Singh.

Khanna is a voice talent, rendering commentary and voiceovers for documentaries, advt films and feature-films. She also anchors international and national conferences, cultural shows and seminars for organisations, UN agencies, corporate groups and Government agencies.

Khanna has also given the female voice over for the Delhi Metro along with male voice over of Shammi Narang.and also she has given voice over for Kochi metro

== Personal life ==
Khanna is married to businessman Deepak Khanna. The couple lives in Vasant Kunj, New Delhi and have a 26-year-old son, Sahil Khanna.
