= Stuart Sim =

British academic

Stuart Sim is a literary critic, social critic and critical theorist currently holding place as professor of English literature at Northumbria University (School of Arts & Social Sciences). He is known for his researches on globalization, postmodernism, poststructuralism, postmarxism, continental philosophy, cultural theory and critical theory. He has taught in the Open University, North-West Region, and also the University of Sunderland and is the author, or editor, of 30 books. Sim has also written numerous journal articles and book chapters and his work has been translated into 17 languages. He was elected a Fellow of the English Association in 2002. He received his BA and PhD from Manchester University.

== Selected bibliography ==
- Post-Marxism: An Intellectual History, London: Routledge, 2000.
- Fundamentalist World: The New Dark Age of Dogma, Cambridge: Icon Press, 2004.
- The Eighteenth-Century Novel and Contemporary Social Issues, Edinburgh: Edinburgh University Press, 2008.
- The End of Modernity: What the Financial & Environmental Crisis Is Really Telling Us, Edinburgh: Edinburgh University Press, 2010.
- Melancholy Experience in Literature of the Long Eighteenth Century: Before Depression 1660–1800, Basingstoke: Palgrave, 2011 (with Allan Ingram, Clark Lawlor, Richard Terry, John Baker and Leigh Wetherall-Dickson).
- Derrida and the End of History, Cambridge: Icon Press, 1999.
