= Ashok Malhotra (professor) =

Dr. Ashok Malhotr

Ashok Malhotra (born 1950, Pune, India) is an Indian professor, higher education professional and author.

== Early life and education ==
Ashok Malhotra is the son of Colonel A. P. Malhotra and Nand Rani Malhotra (Nando). He is the brother of Lt. General Anoop Malhotra. He graduated from the Indian Institute of Technology at Delhi in 1971 with a degree in Mechanical Engineering, and received a doctoral degree in Mechanical Engineering from the University of British Columbia, Canada in 1978.

== Academic career ==
Malhotra began his academic career as a lecturer at IIT Delhi in 1978, where, although he earned much respect of colleagues, he earned flak of establishment for his bold and independent stance on work and academic policy. To quote from a report in a 1981 issue of 'India Today' a prominent news magazine,

Jain (The Director) dismisses this frustration as "rumour mongering" and says that staffers should submit their grievances to him and not to the press. He dismisses the fear of victimisation but forgets that late last year Ashok Malhotra, a lecturer who is immensely respected by his colleagues and was at the Centre of Energy Studies, was abruptly served with a termination notice. But was later reinstated in the Mechanical Engineering Department.

Malhotra has been on the faculty of the Indian Institute of Technology, Delhi, The University of British Columbia Canada and the University of Mosul in Iraq. His most recent appointment during 2009–2010 was as the Director of the Amrapali Institute of Technology and Sciences, AITS in the Nainital District of India.

== Supercritical fluids ==
Malhotra has had special interests in supercritical fluids. His Ph.D. Thesis was on supercritical carbon dioxide. He has also worked on the optimal design of power plants using supercritical steam and written a book on supercritical steam. Following is a quotation on it by Christopher Mims,

Supercritical steam has already been used in coal-fired and nuclear power plants. The mechanism by which it yields higher efficiency is complicated, but ultimately it boils down to this: steam turbines need very hot steam in order to produce power, and supercritical steam is much closer to this temperature than cooler steam, says Ashok Malhotra, who literally wrote the book on the subject (Thermodynamic Properties of Supercritical Steam).

== Turbulent Prandtl number ==
The Turbulent Prandtl number is a non-dimensional parameter required in convective turbulent heat transfer calculations. The simplest model for turbulent Prandtl Number is the Reynolds analogy, which yields a turbulent Prandtl number of unity. However, from experimental data based on air or water adjustments have been made to values slightly different from unity. Its counterpart the Prandtl number is employed in laminar flow calculations. However, most flows in nature are turbulent rather than laminar and therefore incorporating the use of turbulent Prandtl Number becomes necessary. Its use can be entirely bypassed through more complicated and advanced heat flux modelling but challenges still remain in its formulation. Ashok Malhotra and Kang (1984) showed through calculations in a circular pipe that the Turbulent Prandtl Number is not close to unity but rather a strong function of the molecular Prandtl number amongst other parameters. They developed relationships between the turbulent and molecular Prandtl number that can be employed in convective heat transfer calculations. Their work has been substantiated by other researchers e.g.. McEligot and Taylor, 1996 and Churchill

== Publications ==
Recent publications by Malhotra include, How to Create excellent Universities and Steam Property Tables Some publications from his research areas of solar energy, heat transfer and fluid flow are, Minimizing convective heat losses in flat plate solar collectors, Modelling the flow in a Hydrocyclone, Optimal Geometries of Solar concentrators., heat exchangers and thermodynamic properties of steam

== Other activities ==
Aside from his professional interests in higher education, science and technology, Malhotra's interest range from the environment to the economy; from ancient history to philosophy. He regularly shares his views on such topics with the wider online community through his blogs. He has also authored a novel and a novella that elaborate his environmental and philosophical views through the medium of fiction.
