= Thought leader =

Entity recognized as an intellectual authority

A thought leader is an individual or firm recognized as a foremost authority in a specific field. As the term implies, a thought leader leads others in the thinking around a given topic".

== Meanings ==
=== Go-to expert ===
From the perspective of a thought leader as the 'go-to expert', being a thought leader means to consistently answer the biggest questions on the minds of the target audience on a particular topic. It also means to address some of the biggest questions that should be considered, but are not yet on the radar of the target audience. Thought leaders are commonly asked to speak at public events, conferences, or webinars to share their insight with a relevant audience. In a 1990 Wall Street Journal Marketing section article, Patrick Reilly used the term "thought leader publications" to refer to such magazines as Harper's.

In the previous decade, the term was revived and re-engineered by marketers.

== Criticism of the phrase and concept ==
The phrase "thought leader" is identified by some writers as an annoying example of business jargon. Kevin Money and Nuno Da Camara of the John Madejski Centre for Reputation at the University of Reading's Henley Management College write that the nebulous nature of the phrase (the unclear nature of "what is and what is not thought leadership") contributes to its reputation among cynics as "meaningless management speak." Some writers, such as Harvard Business Review contributor Dorie Clark, have defended the phrase while agreeing "that it is very icky when people call themselves thought leaders because that sounds a little bit egomaniacal." New York Times columnist David Brooks mocked the lifecycle of the role in a satirical column entitled "The Thought Leader," published in December 2013.

A parody on the term was published in 2016 by Pat Kelly of the Canadian Broadcasting Corporation's comedy radio program This Is That. In the process of the discussion, imitating TED talks, Kelly elicits responses from the audience that exemplify the effect he describes as the result of applying well-known marketing techniques to achieve the impression of being an erudite speaker. The term is also misused when people say they have produced "thought leadership"; instead it is often simply new information on any given topic that may, or may not, be ground breaking or instrumental in leading change.

== See also ==
- Influencer
- Buzzword
- Charismatic authority
- Creative class
- Futures studies
- Opinion leadership
- Public intellectual
