= Madonna and religion =

Aspect in American singer's work

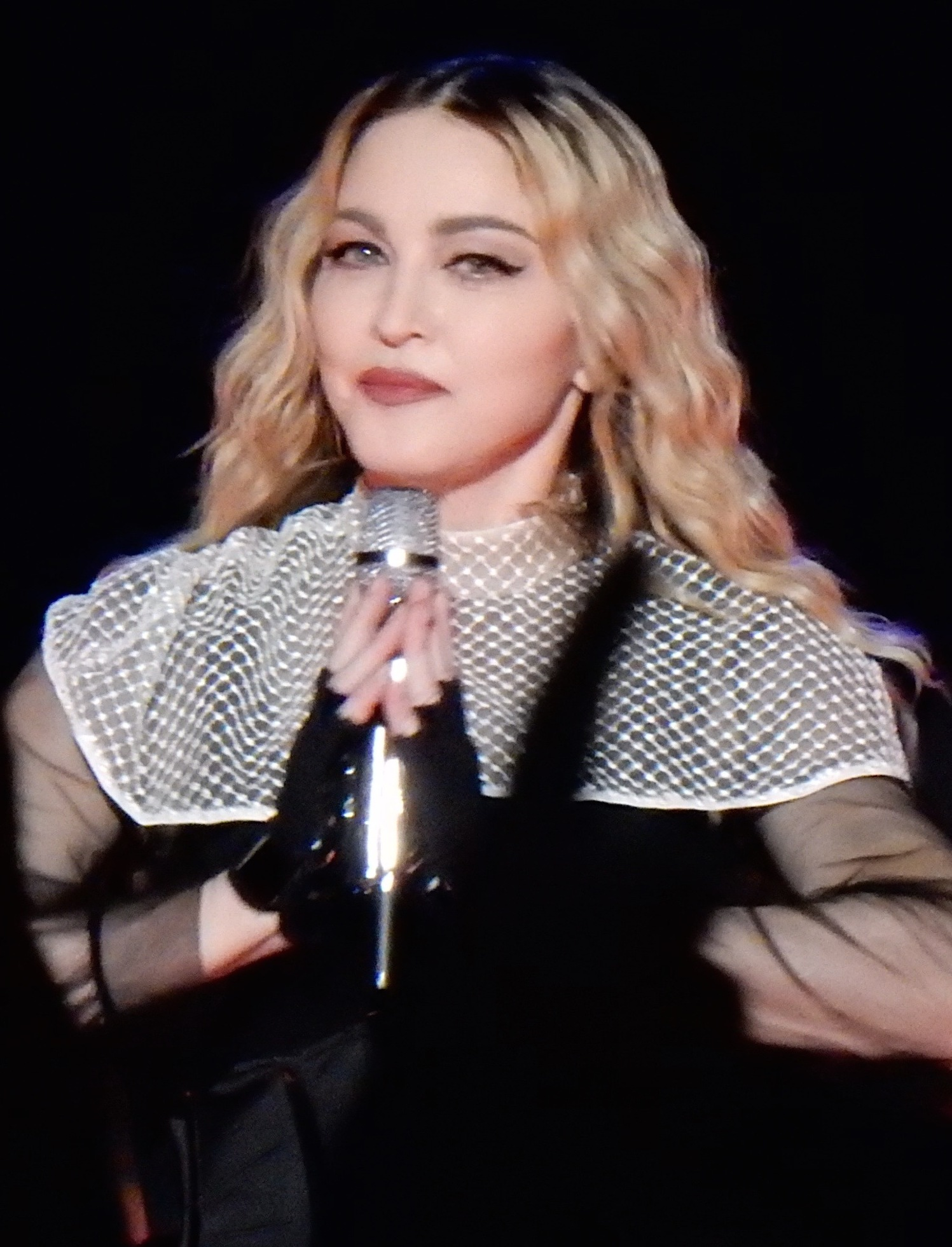
Madonna performing during the Rebel Heart Tour (2015)

American singer-songwriter and actress Madonna has incorporated references to religious themes and spiritual practices from various religions, including Christianity (she was raised Catholic), Judaism, Hinduism, Buddhism, Sufism, and Kabbalah. This became one of the most defining and controversial aspects of her career, with responses documented in the popular press as well as from theologians, sociologists of religion, and other scholars of religion.

Madonna's onstage representations of religion, along with her performances and provocative statements, attracted institutional criticism from groups such as the Catholic Church, Orthodox rabbis, and Hindu leaders. Some individual clergy offered neutral responses. Religious adherents staged protests against Madonna numerous times, and she has been accused by critics of sacrilege, heresy, iconoclasm, and blasphemy. Her personal views on religion have been complex and evolving; while she has acknowledged the teachings and divinity of Jesus, she has expressed disagreement with organized religion, and her eclectic approach to spirituality has been publicly criticized as unorthodox.

Though the phenomenon goes beyond Madonna, she received solid reviews discussing her religious forays with an ambiguous impact in popular culture across decades. She was credited with inspiring various scholars from different fields to seek new approaches for works and its religious meanings. Madonna was among the leading public figures often considered medium for popularizing in Western countries, spiritual traditions coming from Asia such as yoga. She was sometimes analogously described with emic religious words and terms in both religious-targeted and secular press, including the word "icon", with her name appearing in references works such as the Oxford Advanced Learner's Dictionary or Diccionario panhispánico de dudas to illustrate its new usage in contemporary culture. She was also exemplified as an exemplar of religious illiteracy and some have adopted an alienated view of Madonna as the "Great Whore of Babylon".

== Background and scope ==
The success of Madonna as an international pop star cannot be disconnected from the religious history she created through her relationship to a series of religious authorities—Catholic, Hindu, and Jewish—and who she incited to reply to her ostensible profanations.

— Diane Winston, professor of media and religion (2012).

Shortly after her debut in the 1980s, various cultural analyses of her figure touched on Madonna's religious connotations. Various of them were categorized under her mini academic subdiscipline, the Madonna studies, which flourished with other topics, according to observers such as Andi Zeisler, Douglas Kellner and Ricardo Baca. Author and professor Thomas Ferraro notes this early stage, saying "Madonna's impact posed an expressly religious puzzle". She also became a "favorite topic" for religious fundamentalists in her prime according to editors of Religion and Popular Culture (2016). They also addressed how her video "Like a Prayer" inspired "perhaps more than any other music video scholarly analysis of its religious meanings". On the other hand, religious studies scholars, like James R. Lewis, explored Madonna's figure from perspectives that included astrology.

In 2018, Cady Lang from Time magazine, commented that there are few figures more closely associated with religion in pop culture than Madonna. According to Ferraro, in Felling Italian: The Art of Ethnicity in America (2005), "Italian Catholicism informs just about everything Madonna does, most often in ways that are not officially sanctioned". Such long-standing relationship or reciprocal reactions from Roman Catholic Church was noted by publications, including Phoenix New Times, whose editor Jason Keil described as a "synonymous with each other" in 2015. In 2010, Time magazine included Madonna's moments in their "Top 10 Vatican Pop-Culture Moments"; a rank that shows how the Roman Catholic Church mixed with contemporary culture.

== Madonna's religious profile ==
Madonna's religious background and public display have been documented.

=== Catholicism ===
Madonna was born and raised Catholic. She adopted "Veronica" as her confirmation name, paying tribute to Saint Veronica.

Agents like the American theologian Chester Gillis, have explained that Madonna was educated in a strict Catholic household. It influenced and left a mark on both her life and career, with scholar Arthur Asa Berger recalling "the importance of her Italian Catholic background". In 1991, Christian author Graham Cray, wrote for Third Way that Madonna was the only lapsed Catholic in popular music who "has made a reaction against her Catholic background, in her driving force" and as a source of "motivation of her work". Years later, however, French academic Georges-Claude Guilbert commented that "her resentment toward Catholicism is proportional to the marks it left on her", but he didn't feel it as "particularly original", because many writers and artists built entire careers on such ambivalent feelings. To American philosopher Mark C. Taylor, "Madonna's ongoing involvement with Catholicism is exceedingly complex".

Biographer J. Randy Taraborrelli, in Madonna: An Intimate Biography (2018) adds that to Madonna's ambivalence about religion "must have been the way she was influenced by the somewhat fanatical —and confusing— she witnessed in her mother". He cited an adult Madonna saying: "I saw my mother doing things that really affected me. She would kneel on uncooked rice [...] If my aunt came over my house and had jeans that zipped up front, my mother covered all the statues so that they couldn't see such a display. She then turned the holy pictures towards the wall".

=== Spiritual seeking ===
Madonna made a major turn in the mid-1990s during her pregnancy. She began practicing yoga and reading spiritual developments coming from Asia such as Hinduism and Buddhism. She also became a Kabbalah devotee. However, she kept her Christian education, revealing that her daughter Lourdes, "will spend more time with the Bible than her television". Religious professor Kathryn Lofton, said that her turn to Kabbalah "inspired articles emphasizing her new spiritual enthusiasm". Erik Davis, considered her case "the biggest metaphysical blast" in an article for Spin published in 1999, where he reviewed industry's artists that incorporated or practiced spiritual beliefs. Commentators Craig Detweiler and Barry Taylor called it a "notable turn" in her life, impacted by motherhood, yoga, Kabbalah and Hindu mysticism.

Amid her spiritual enthusiasm, Madonna later adopted the name "Esther", a Biblical Hebrew name that means "star". Shalom Goldman, a Middlebury College professor of religion, quotes Madonna as having claimed to have studied all the women of the Old Testament but she was most drawn to Esther because "she saved the Jews of Persia from annihilation". Some of her religious fans, according to Goldman, considered the name's choice as a "manifestation of the divine shekhinah" which in Kabbalah denotes "the feminine aspect of God's presence". Rabbi Kerry M. Olitzky made the suggestion that Open Source Judaism was what allowed her to develop an interest in Kabbalah without any interest in converting to Judaism.

After her introduction to the Kabbalah studies, Madonna assisted for years to the Kabbalah Centre in Los Angeles, introduced by her friend Sandra Bernhard. The centre attracted several Hollywood celebrities from Elizabeth Taylor to Britney Spears, but Madonna attracted "bigger headlines" according to Los Angeles Times investigative journalists Harriet Ryan and Kim Christensen. Publications and authors, including Reuters in 2011, Katherine Stewart in 2012, and British author Harry Freedman in 2019, similarly elaborated how Madonna drew extraordinary publicity to the centre, leading to her being called their most prominent devotee. According to American scientist Peter Gleick, she also made famous their "Kabbalah water".

Into the 2010s, it remained unclear if Madonna kept studying Kabbalah or if she was still an active member of the centre. In 2017, a Vice contributor explained that many celebrities, stopped attend the centre or studying Kabbalah. In 2011, British tabloid Daily Mirror and other media outlets, reported that Madonna considered joining Opus Dei, although Spanish newspaper El Confidencial reported it was a hoax. In 2020, editor Pedro Marrero interprets that Madonna has been a spiritual woman who has always sought God. Mary Lambert, director of her video "Like a Prayer", describes that "Madonna is a very religious person in her own way". Madonna herself, told Terry Wogan, in a 1991 interview, "I'm spiritual, religious". By 2022, she declared that spends some of her time praying for others. She reportedly prays before a stage show, and for what academic Akbar Ahmed called Madonna, the "pop philosopher of postmodernist culture" in the 1990s.

=== Madonna's religious views, and others interpretations ===
Besides her spiritual seeking, Madonna has made several statements about religion, and specific denominations. "So many critics seem to love to discuss Madonna's obsession with religion", wrote Fosca D'Acierno in The Italian American Heritage (1998). In this regard, Anne-Marie Korte from Utrecht University, wrote that "religion plays a major role in Madonna's statements and provocations". Author Donald C. Miller, said "she has made very strong verbal and nonverbal statements".

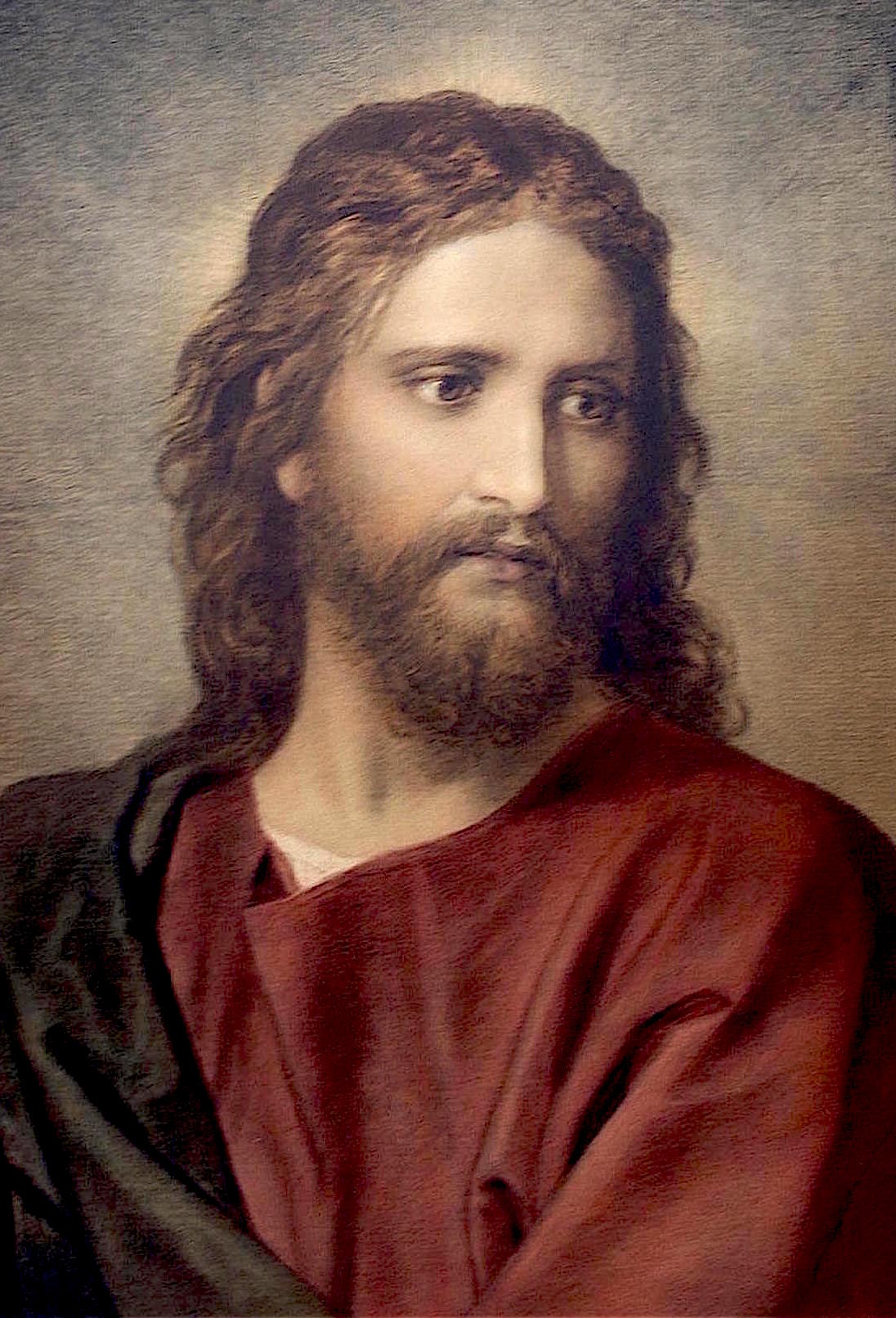
Madonna's views on religion have shifted and been complex. She was cited recognizing Jesus Christ's divinity (depicted in the image by Heinrich Hofmann), but disagreeing with religion organizations.

In 2015, during an interview with the Irish Independent, she stated: "I don't affiliate myself with any specific religious group. I connect to different ritualistic aspects of different belief systems, and I see the connecting thread between all religious beliefs". In 2016, she stated that her use of Christian imagery "is just proof of her devotion to Catholicism". She has been quoted criticizing Catholic dogma, saying once that Catholicism "[is] not what God and Christianity are all about". She stated that the God she believes in created the world, and isn't a "God to fear, it's a God to give thanks to". In 2019, she also felt and stated: "The idea that in any church you go, you see a man on a cross and everyone genuflects and prays to him [...] in a way it's paganism/idolatry because people are worshipping a thing".

In Fill These Hearts (2013), West quotes Madonna supporting Jesus as a divine being, who walked on the Earth, but she rejects "the religious behavior of any religious organization that does not encourage you to ask questions and your own explorations". Similarly, Christian author Dan Kimball wrote in They Like Jesus but Not the Church (2009), that "Madonna doesn't find anything wrong with the teachings of Jesus" but doesn't believe that "all paths lead to God", citing the problem of religious war. Spaniard music critic Joaquín Luqui reports that she loves Jesus, in "her own way".

Canadian professor of religious studies, Aaron W. Hughes, in Defining Judaism: A Reader (2016), interprets that "for Madonna, religion in general and Judaism in particular are inherently divisive and this divisiveness is ultimately responsible for the problems we face". Korte was critical, saying that "Madonna's interest in religion has never been theologically focused: it consists of a combinations of distrust towards institutional religion and an eclectic individual form of spirituality".

Broadly, Catholic author Christopher West believes that "her reflections on her religious upbringing echo the sentiments of a large swath of the population". Similarly, Focus on the Family's blogger Adam Holz, considered Madonna as the "Poster Child" for the way many would claim "spiritual, but not religious", while describing her eclectic personal approach of spirituality as both postmodern and syncretistic (it blends a variety of religious worldviews).

== Implementation in her works ==
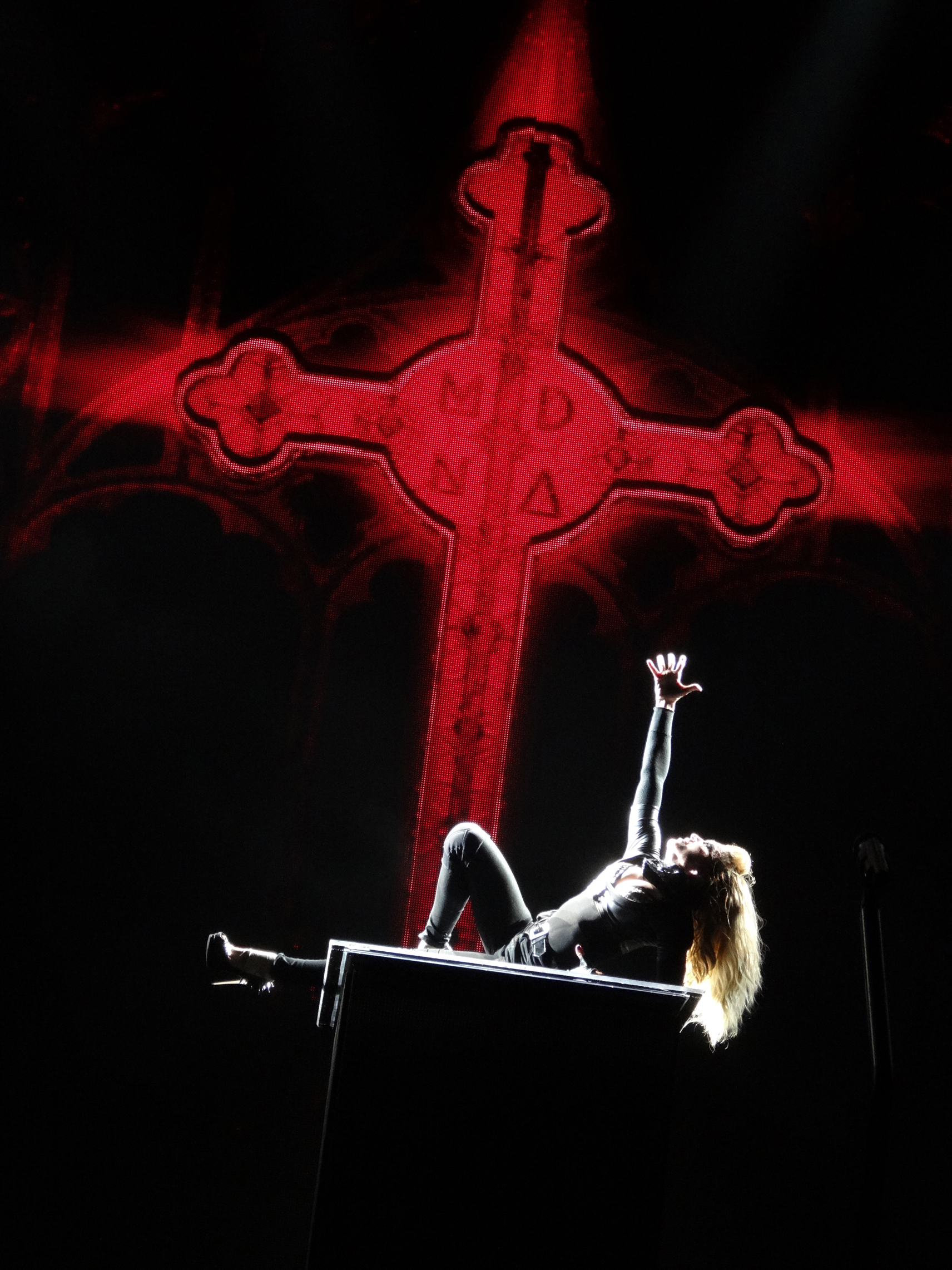
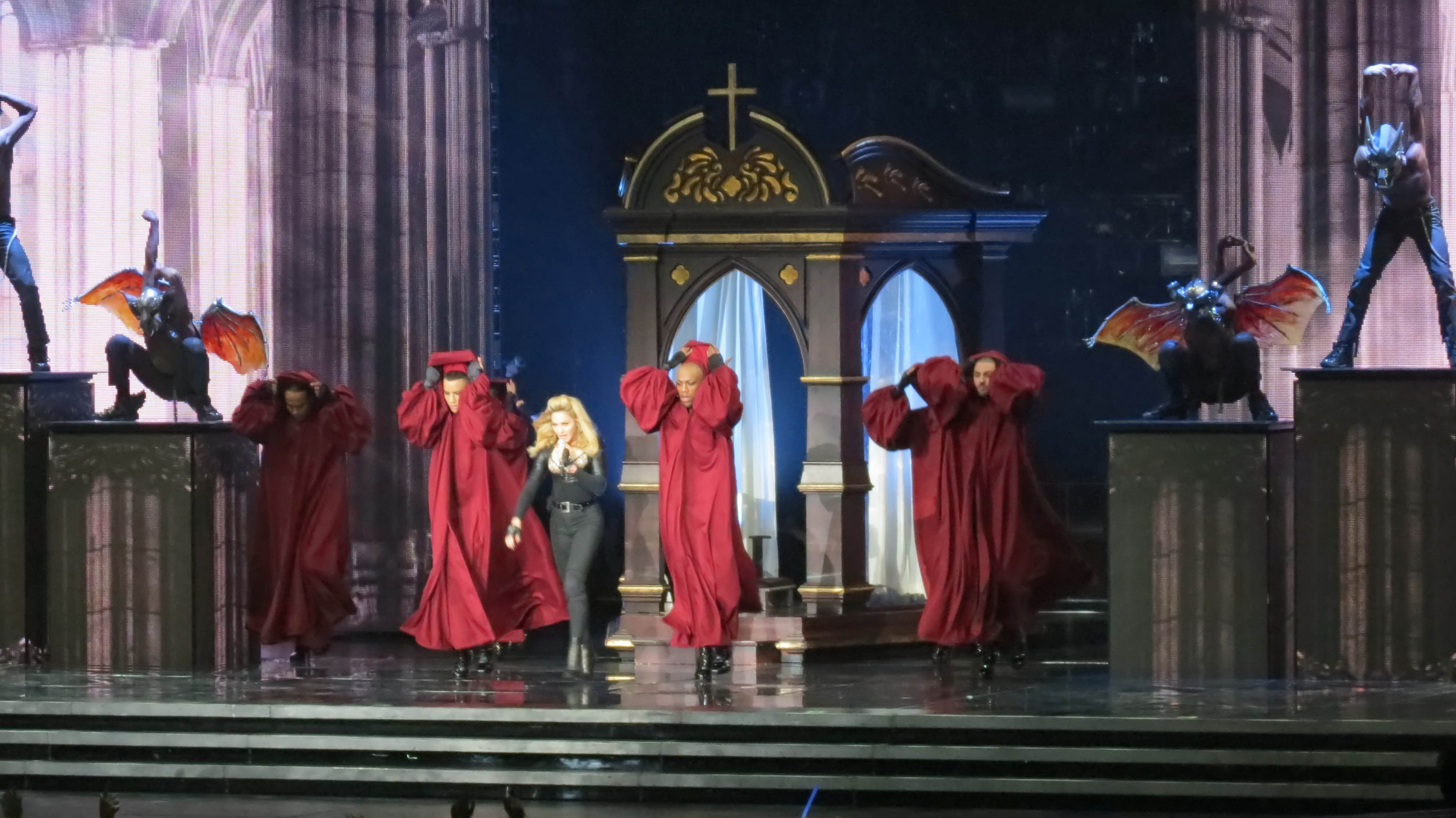
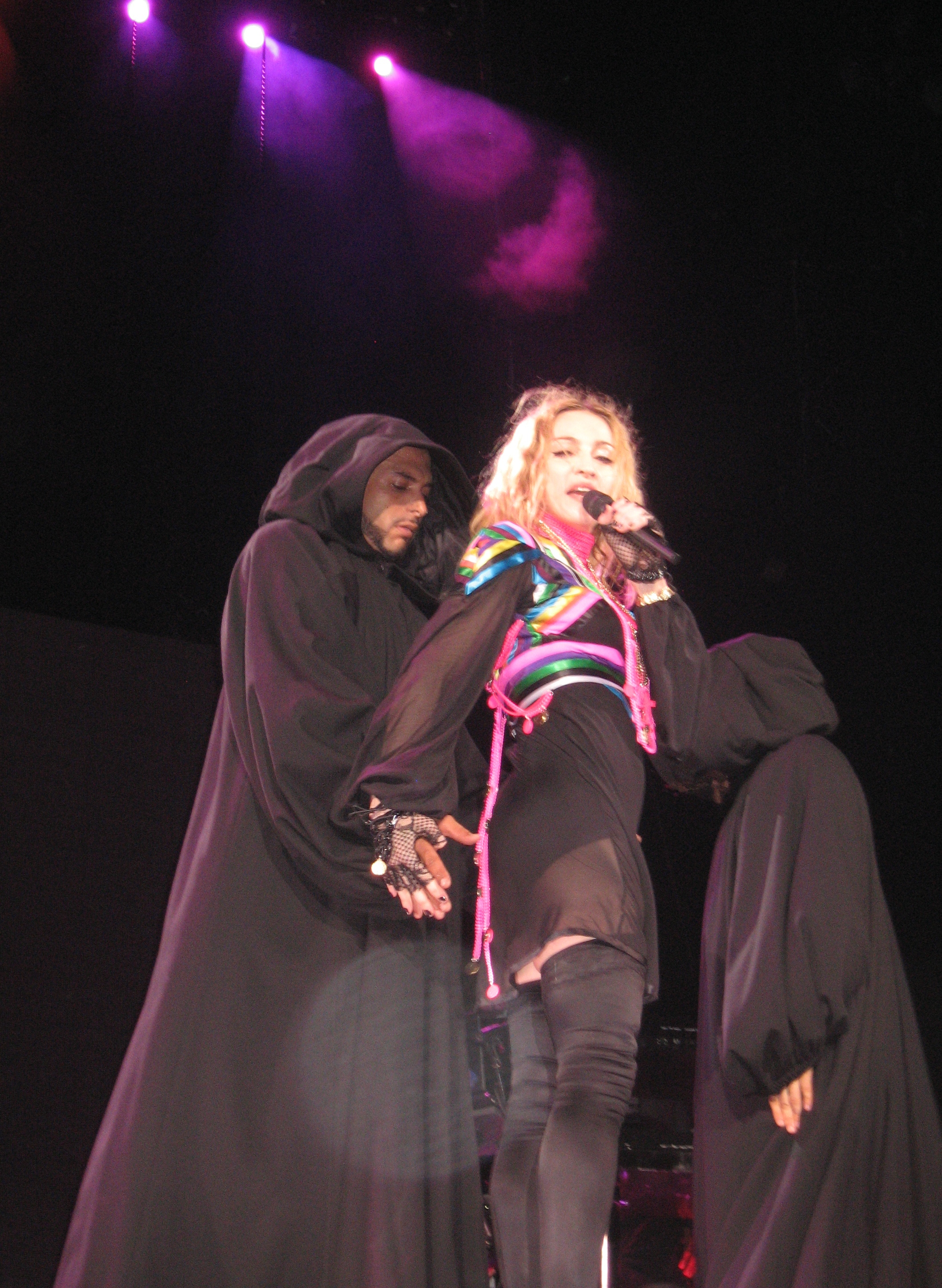
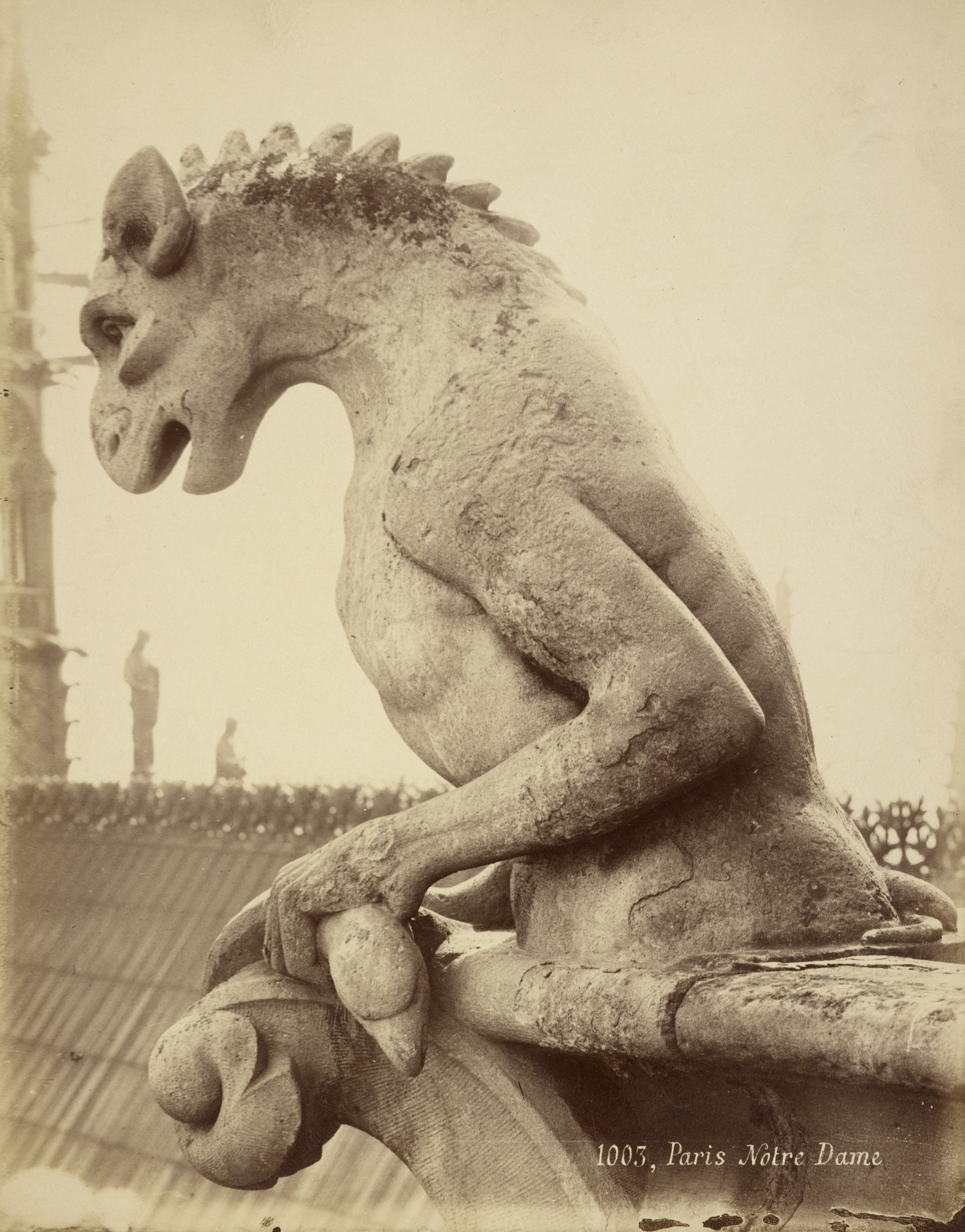
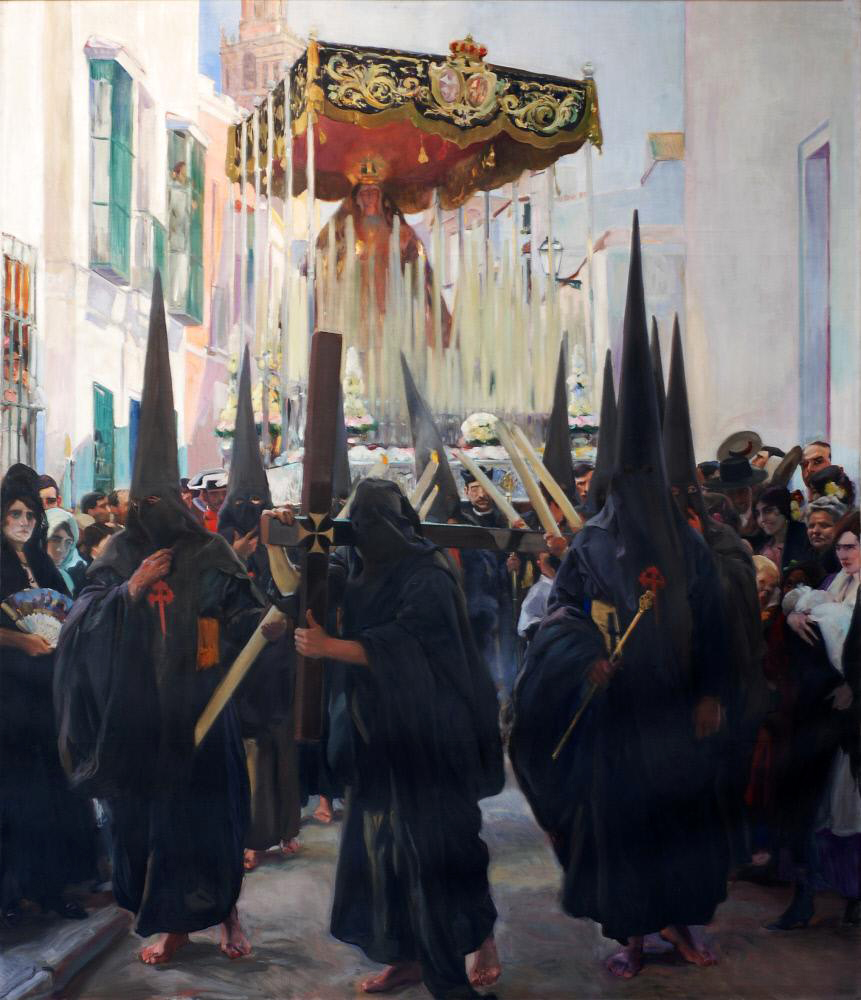
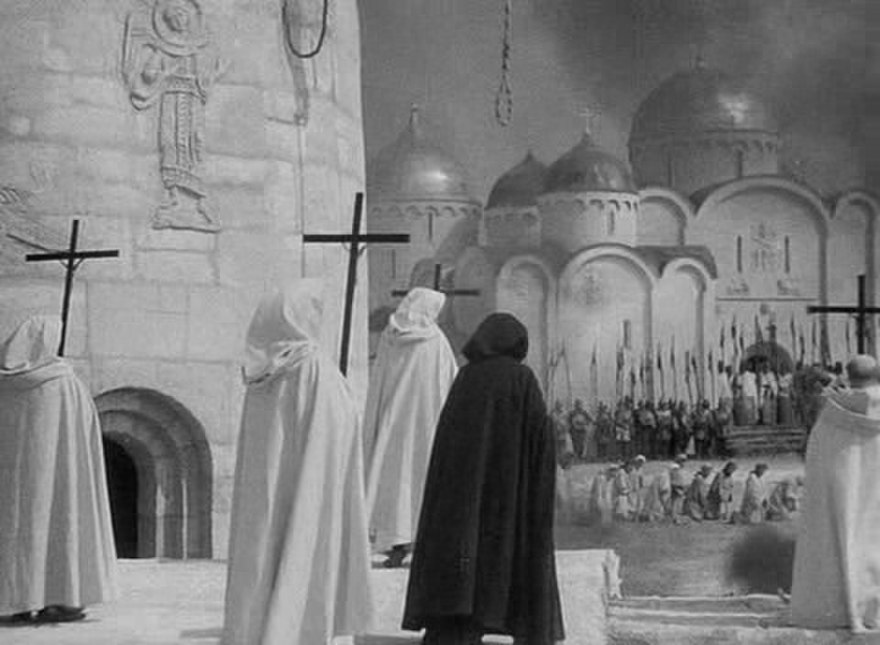
Aside to have had incorporated elements of other religions and denominations, Madonna has taken inspiration from Catholic art, including those depicted in church's buildings as well she has "frequently" used Catholic symbols/iconography from Catholic culture. First row: Madonna's onstage religious display. Second row: Imagery predominantly of Catholicism. (Note: First row: Madonna during the MDNA Tour (first and second photo) and during the Sticky & Sweet Tour performing "Spanish Lessons". Media compared her religious symbolism with that of Christian imagery (predominantly Catholic), with elements such as a Gothic chapel, monks or capirotes, as well as altars, censer, and gargoyles (this latter in the MDNA Tour). Second row: examples of a Catholic Gothic Church (Notre-Dame Church and its gargoyles), capirotes (artwork depicting Nazarenos from Spain's Sevilla in 1914) and Teutonic Order monks.)

Religion has influenced Madonna's artistic path; she frequently incorporates religious iconography and themes of different denominations into her visuals and works. Cath Martin from Christian Today, wrote she "blurred the lines between art and her own take on religion". Due to her abundant usage, Conrad Ostwalt, a religious studies scholar at Appalachian State University, wrote in Secular Steeples (2012): "Perhaps the most interesting pop star whose work touches upon and implicates religious themes is Madonna". Similarly, professor Andrew Tomasello as cited by scholars David Rothenberg and Benjamin Brand, referred:

Perhaps the first artist of our time and certainly the most successful to routinely employ facile images from many spiritual cultures and multiple religious traditions is the pop music star Madonna.

Catholic iconography has been Madonna's constant. She is credited with even popularizing the cross in pop music as a decorative object, which she uses in her shows and videos. Martin commented that her love affair with the cross "has spanned her music career". As her career continued, she involved Kabbalistic motives in her work and reportedly refused to work on Friday night and Saturday, as a result in her observance of the Jewish Sabbath. Religious Jewish symbols and Hebrew letters featured in some of her works, and Madonna was seen numerous times, with the red string around her wrist to ward off the evil eye, a trendy practice among celebrities during the Bush era, according to a Vice contributor.

Among her many other religious references, she included sufism themes. A prominent reference was the video of "Bedtime Story", where shows scenes of whirling dervishes. The song co-wrote by Icelandic singer Björk, was interpreted by authors of The Gaze of the West and Framings of the East (2012) to have a sufi-inspired verse, "let's get unconscious".

In 2023, she reflected her work as an "artist united people, gave them freedom of expression, unity. It was the mirror of Jesus' teachings", in her understanding. About her use of crosses, she stated: "I like crosses. I'm sentimental about Jesus on the cross. Jesus was a Jew, and also I believe he was a catalyst, and I think he offended people because his message was to love your neighbor as yourself [...] He embraced all people, whether it was a beggar on the street or a prostitute, and he admonished a group of Jews who were not observing the prophets of the Torah. So he rattled a lot of people's cages".

=== Critical observations ===
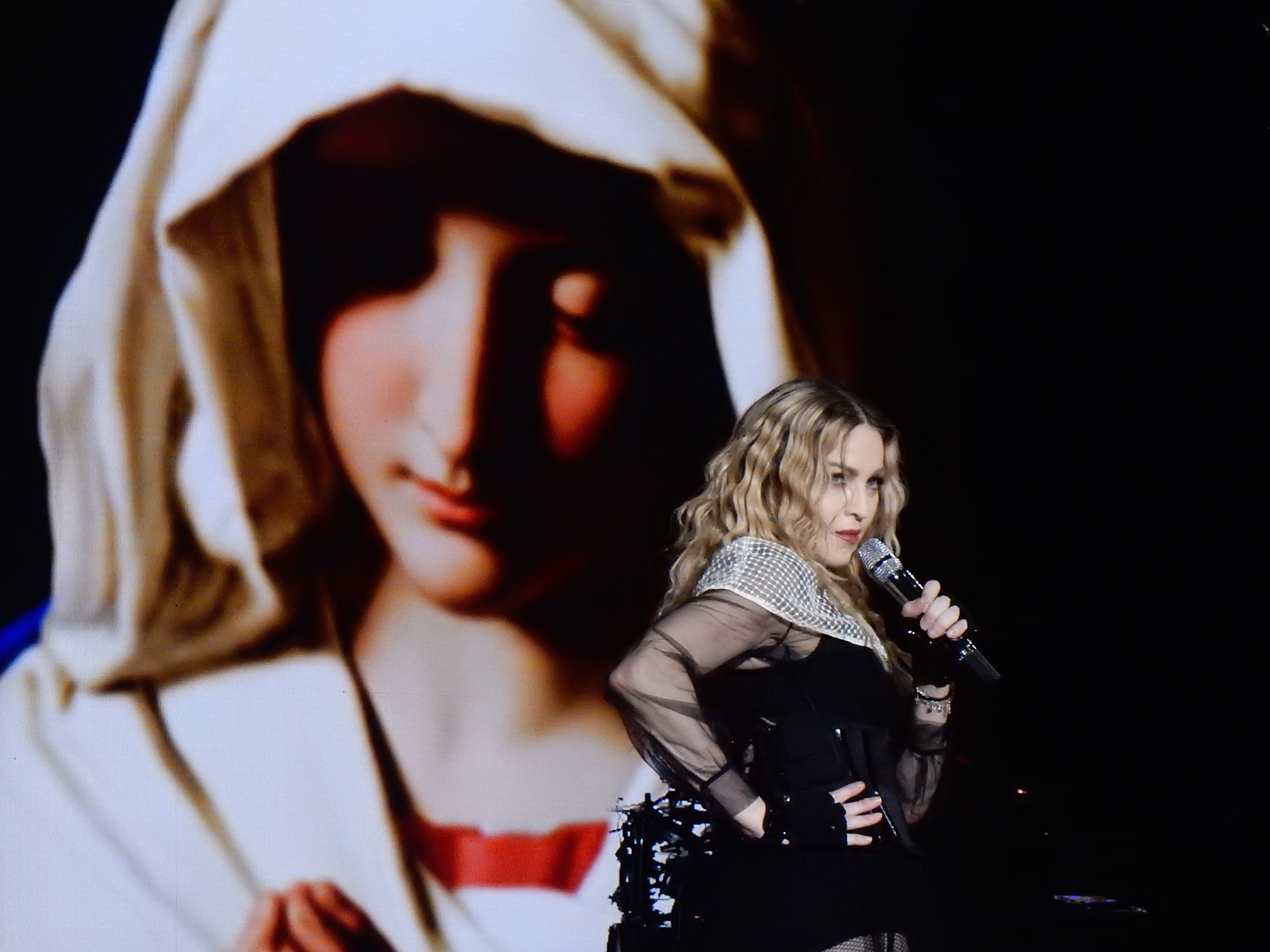
Madonna is credited to allude Marian themes in her works. In the image, Madonna and a Virgin Mary picture's artwork used as a backdrop in her Rebel Heart Tour.

A number of theologians noted the use of female religious imagery by Madonna. She has played with female characters and roles from the Christian faith tradition, according to authors of Doing Gender in Media, Art and Culture (2009). In The Virgin in Art (2018), Kyra Belán, wrote that she in particular has appropriated of the Virgin Mary, perhaps more than other artist. Feminist theologian Grietje Dresen, argues that Madonna seems to have incorporated very well her Roman Catholic education, in which the beauty, purity, and self-control of the 'immaculate' Virgin Mary are presented to girls as the standard of perfection. Madonna herself, addressed from her Catholic upbringing: "I grew up with two images of women, the virgin and the whore".

In an article from BBC Culture of 2018, Madonna was described as "the original and ultimate" marriage of celebrity and the Catholic imagination", and as the first major popstar to reference symbols that defined a Catholic upbringing. Author and professor Thomas Ferraro, cites celebrities such Mario Puzo and Frank Sinatra as examples of an "Italian pagan Catholic understanding of power", but he claims Madonna "gave it" a "long-awaited" and much "needed" female valence. On the other hand, her mispronunciation for the astangi in Ray of Light earned criticism of Hindu priests in Benaras and also intrigued some Sanskrit scholars.

== Leadership reactions ==
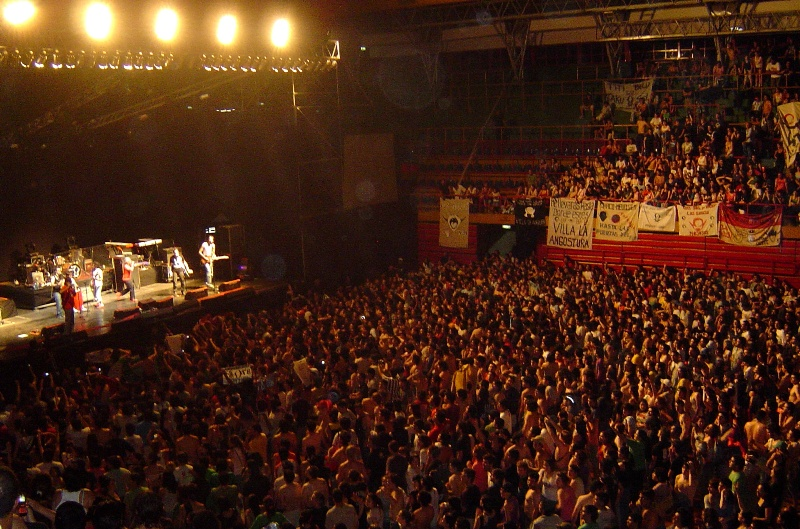
American philosopher Mark C. Taylor noted Madonna revived a similar longstanding religious criticism on rock and roll. In the image, a rock concert at Argentina.

Madonna has received criticism from religious organizations and leaders of different denominations, over the best part of her career. "Madonna has a particular distinction of enraging a variety of religious leaders", wrote Purchase College professor Steven C. Dubin. Alone her 2006 onstage crucifixion, attracted criticism from Christian, Muslim and Jewish leaders. About that event, San Francisco Examiner staffers, said "only Madonna could get Muslim, Jewish and Catholic leaders to agree on something". American philosopher Mark C. Taylor noted Madonna revived a similar longstanding religious criticism on rock and roll, that led representative of the religions charge her as a demonic.

=== Christianity ===
The Vatican State and some Popes of her generation condemned numerous of Madonna's acts. During the late-twentieth century, the Catholic Church opposed to her Italian show of the Who's That Girl Tour in 1987, her advertisement with Pepsi in 1989, the Blond Ambition Tour in 1990 or for her first book Sex, in 1992. Organizations related to the Church, such as the Episcopal Conference of Italy criticized Madonna, and tried to ban her concerts. A parish priest from the organization, denounced Madonna as "an infidel and sacrilegious".

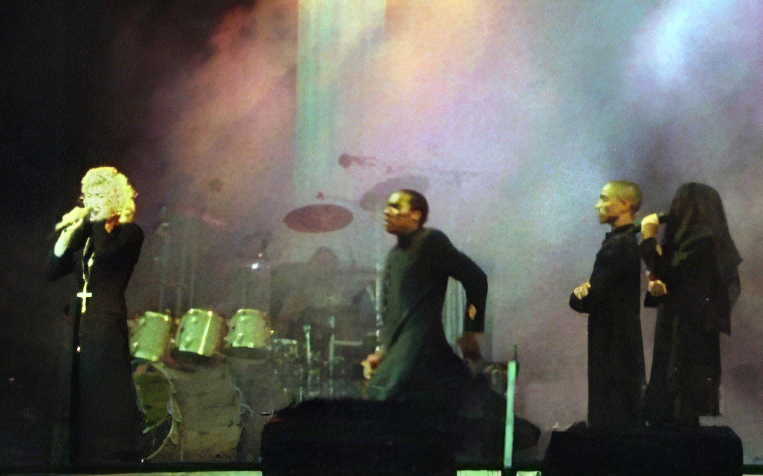
Madonna during her Blond Ambition World Tour. The show was castigated as "one of the most satanic shows in the history of humanity" by Pope John Paul II.

She continued to attract public disapproval from Catholic Church in the early years of the 21st century. Vatican representatives questioned her forays with the Kabbalah. With her Confessions Tour, Madonna garnered a major backlash for her segment when she appeared crucified on a giant cross in the countries where the tour was scheduled. Ersilio Tonini speaking with the approval of Pope Benedict XVI, commented "she should be excommunicated". In the 2010s, she was condemned with her Rebel Heart Tour by senior bishops like Patric Dunn from New Zealand, who commented, "There is no question in my mind that some of Madonna's material is highly offensive to Christianity and will be found just as offensive to the majority of people of religious faith", while Singaporean prelate William Goh commented, "There is no neutrality in faith".

Other leaders and groups from Christian denominations, such as the Baptist Church, have criticized her. Ghanaian religious leader Opoku Onyinah described thus "instead yielding to Christian principles, she decided to rebel against everything Christianity stands for". Vsevolod Chaplin from the Russian Orthodox Church, says "I'm absolutely sure that this person needs spiritual assistance" further adding "It's definitely clear for me that all these attempts to use religious symbols also reflect her state of mind and state of soul". American Baptist pastor Jerry Falwell and other conservative Christians leaders found Madonna's wearing religious symbols "trivializing" and "blasphemous" as well. In The Extermination of Christianity: A Tyranny of Consensus (1993) by clerics Paul Schenck and Rob Schenck, her usage of Christian imagery is described as obviously designed to raise the ire of the religious community, twice molesting them by using them as a free promotion.

=== Other religions ===
Madonna also attracted the displeasure of various Hindu and Jews spiritual leaders. Orthodox rabbis also concerned about Madonna, denouncing her for debasing "Judaism's deepest mystical tradition", while accusing her of breaking taboos in Kabbalah. Professors of religious studies, Eugene V. Gallagher and Lydia Willsky-Ciollo explained in New Religion (2021), that the Jewish Kabbalah is typically exclusively men and rabbis by trade, but celebrities such as Madonna have taken up the practice under new guise; as a result, both Madonna and Kabbalah Centre attained some criticisms by this conduit. Rabbi Yisrael (Israel) Deri, caretaker of Isaac Luria's tomb (founder of Kabbalah), commented "this kind of woman wreaks an enormous sin upon the Kabbalah". Chief Rabbi of Safed (the birthplace of the Kabbalistic tradition), Shmuel Eliyahu in an open letter to Madonna, pointed out that her performances and public behavior were not in keeping with the values of the practice, "the enchanting wisdom you have so much respect for". Rabbi Yitzchak Schochet strongly objected to Madonna's use of the Kabbalah, arguing that it tarnishes Judaism when people who do not observe Jewish law practice Jewish mysticism. According to American educator and theologian Robert E. Van Voorst, a prominent Jewish rabbi from London, also rebuked her practice of Kabbalah.

Jewish leaders condemned a version of "Justify My Love" that incorporated a passage from the Book of Revelation. Rabbi Abraham Cooper blasted the song as dangerous and was worried that fuel antisemitism. Others panned her video "Die Another Day", in which she bound phylacteries to her arm, a Jewish custom usually reserved for men. Madonna enraged Jewish leaders again with the song "Isaac" from her album Confessions on a Dance Floor, as noted Stephen M. Silverman.

=== Neutral views ===
A handful of religious leaders were sympathetic or neutral towards Madonna's acts, and her artistic representation with religion. According to Goldman, some traditional rabbis tolerated her brand of Kabbalism. Referring to her onstage crucifixion in 2006, some supported it, noted British author Lucy O'Brien. For instance, she brought the example of Jesuit priest Carlos Novoa, whom wrote in El Tiempo, is not a "mockery of the cross, but rather the complete opposite: An exaltation of the mystery of death". Guilbert and others, documented a similar reaction with Catholic priest Andrew Greeley in the late 1980s, after the release of "Like a Prayer". "My personal opinion is that Madonna is an artist and, like most artists, uses her experience and understanding of her culture in her work", Presbyterian minister Glenn Cardy stated in 2016. On the other hand, Sun Ho, a Singaporean Christian pastor and former singer, praised Madonna's music contribution in the field of dance music in 2006.

In Seeker Churches (2000), author addressed the fact that "seeker church pastors tend to be more sympathetic in their analysis of Madonna's misguided quest for personal fulfillment", as pastor Lee Strobel suggests that Madonna's main problem is neither her "almost sacrilegious use of religious symbols" nor her "morally objectionable behavior", but instead that "she seeks fulfillment in all the wrong places". John W. Frye, citing Strobel in Jesus the Pastor (2010), said his models of teaching move toward "compassion" as in What Jesus Would Say, Strobel "imagines Jesus speaking to Madonna". Catholic priest Michael P. Sullivan, writing for Sun-Sentinel in 1994, stated: "Perhaps Madonna's displays of religion and her belief that she 'reeks of Catholicism' is part of God's unfolding will for her to be Madonna, virgin, open and loving, and perhaps mother as well".

== Public reaction ==
Reactions towards Madonna among religious press and community, as well from general public for her religious display, vary with different degrees and perspectives.

=== Religious community ===
Public religious demonstrations against Madonna (1990s—2010s)

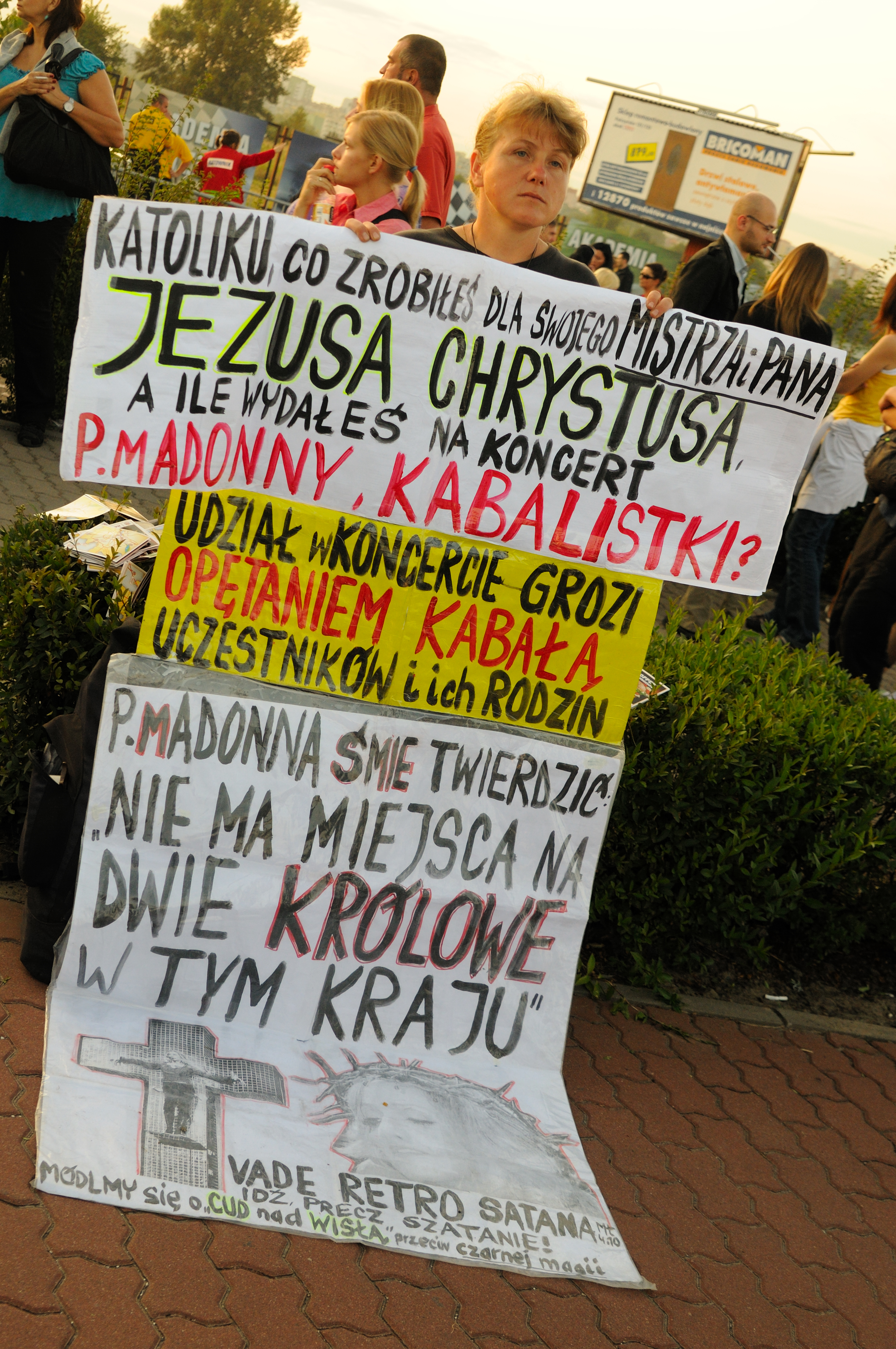
A religious sympathizer protesting prior her gig of the Sticky & Sweet Tour in Poland (2009)

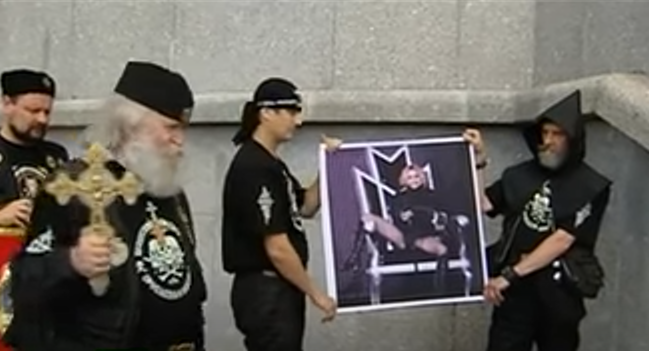
Members of the Russian-Serbian organisation Union of Orthodox Banner-Bearers set fire to a Madonna poster after accusing her of blasphemy.

The Christian community has been described as the religious sector most offended by Madonna. According to Guilbert, she has been punished by the religious right, such as televangelists and puritans throughout the years. According to American journalist Christopher Andersen, she was "across the globe [...] being condemned as a heretic". Outside Christian religious community, in 2005, Reuters also informed: She "[...] has drawn frequent censure from ultra-Orthodox Jews who say her embrace of Kabbalah debases their religion". Some of them deemed Madonna as a "depraved cultural icon".

Madonna's persona and work were both analyzed and commented in some religious-targeted publications. Colombian newspaper El Tiempo remarked in 1997, a dedicated article to Madonna and her film Evita by Italian's Catholic newspaper Famiglia Cristiana. She topped 2013's rank by Religion News Service of the "10 'blasphemous' pop songs and music videos". In the book What about Christian Rock? (1986), authors compared how the religious press called Christian singer Sheila Walsh "sexy", while labeling "porn queen Madonna 'born again'". They also reported about the nickname given to Amy Grant, as the "Madonna of Christian Rock", explaining that some publications picked it up, but when it appeared in the religious press, it offended many Christian readers. In 2015, correspondents of Catholic website Aleteia reviewed her; both Susan Wills and David Mills, deemed her religious imagery of the Rebel Heart Tour as "so last century" or "so 1980s". Susan also compared Saint Hildegard of Bingen's reputation, saying her fan base "continue to grow eight centuries after her death". In 2006, during her Confessions Tour, Christine Whelan dedicated an article to Madonna in Paulist Fathers' Busted Halo, receiving commentaries by website's community. Broadly, American religion historian Randall J. Stephens wrote in The Devil's Music: How Christians Inspired, Condemned, and Embraced Rock ’n’ Roll (2016), that some Christians might find the songs of performers such as the Beatles, Led Zeppelin or Madonna "degraded and artless". Madonna appeared with other entertainers in Focus on the Family's Chart Watch book of 1998, where some albums were reviewed, remarking their "pro-social content" and "objectionable" content, as well an "advisory" to readers.

Various Madonna's concerts were condemned by religious adherents, including radical Orthodox believers. For instance, during her 1993's Girlie Show, Plinio Corrêa de Oliveira, a Brazilian traditional Catholic activist reported protests and "rebuff" in countries such Germany and Argentina. She angered many Polish religious adherents in various of her stops when she toured. According to Evangelical Times during her Dutch stop of the Confessions Tour, police arrested a 63-year-old priest who admitted to making a hoax call in an attempt to disrupt the event. A bomb threat was also reported. In January 2023, Madonna sparked again outrage among Christian community after doing an all-female Last Supper photoshoot, and also for channeling Virgin Mary as Our Lady of Sorrows, on the first Vanity Fair's European "Icon issue". The European Conservative headlined, that her photoshoots "Reveals Deep Occult Roots of the Entertainment Industry".

Moderate views have been also reported. Jock McGregor, a contributor to the evangelical organization L'Abri commented that "not all Christians have been hostile" toward Madonna. McGregor, himself, considered dedicating a few words to Madonna because she is "a significant and representative child of her times". Anglican British writer, Karl Dallas commented at some point that "so far she has done little more than to use the talents God gave her, and challenged a few sensibilities with them". Professor of religion Donna Freitas, and also a Christian adherent, gave a positive commentary to her crucifixion, interpreting "she is performing a woman's right to stand in Jesus's place".

=== Theological, secular and other views ===
Madonna has also been criticized from reviewers of non-religious targeted press, although throughout years, others have interpreted her religious display differently as well, with some favoring free speech. In Stealing My Religion: Not Just Any Cultural Appropriation (2022), her usage of Catholic aesthetics is understood as an appropriation "to promote her brand". Academic Anne-Marie Korte, similarly states she uses Christian symbols and misuses them to attract attention while showing disrespect for Christian and for religion in general. University of Exeter's Alan W. Hooker, in Katie B. Edwards' Rethinking Biblical Literacy (2015), believes that despite her use of "religious symbols as entertainment" is the reason she attracts the strong disapproval of religious institutions, rather he believes that the "problem appears to lie more with Madonna's sexuality and the ways in which she uses it during her performances". Media scholar John Fiske once felt and stated that her uses of religious iconography are neither religious nor sacrilegious.

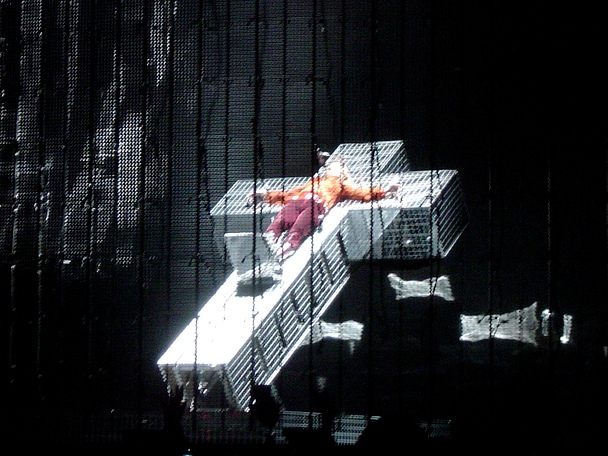
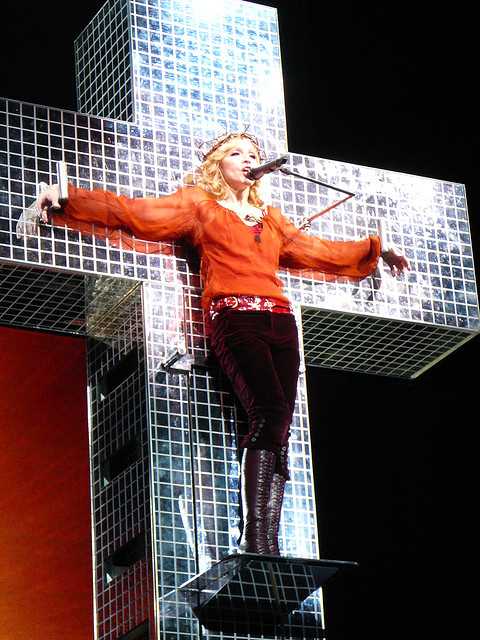
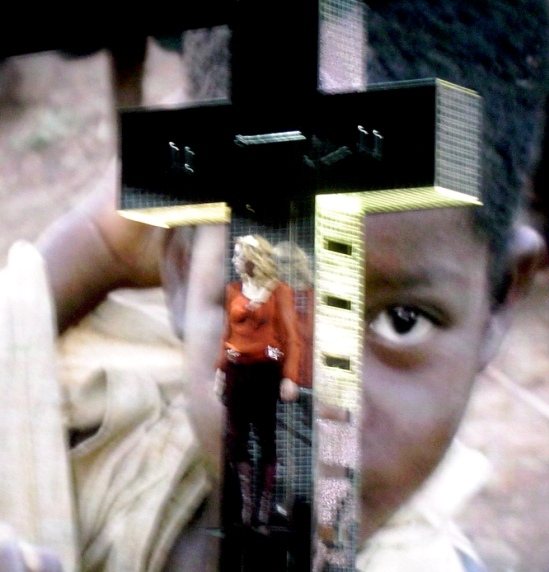
Different views of Madonna's 2006 stage crucifixion, singing "Live to Tell". It received a divisive and controversial reception in the sector while some publications described it as a move to bring attention to the issue of African children dying of AIDS.

During the release of her video of "Like a Prayer", it was reported that religious liberals supported her as a martyr to free speech. According to authors of Doing Gender in Media, Art and Culture (2009), some theologians have supported Madonna, including her 2006 stage crucifixion, been called as a "contribution to feminist theology and liberation theology". They also pointed out, that such performance was "highly appreciated and admired". On the other hand, Marcella Althaus-Reid, a contextual theology professor, adopting Madonna's song "Material Girl", refers on materialistic and divine concepts embodied within theological discourses saying: "We are all material theologians living in a material world". In 2008, Gail Walker from Belfast Telegraph brought the scandals that Catholic Church have rocked, and also commented that her "musings on the simple icons of her culture seem more a positive recognition of the emotional power of Christianity than ridicule of it". Outside Christian world, some Hindu scholars backed Madonna's display of their religious traditions, including Vagish Shastri after the criticism she faced by religious organizations like World Vaisnava Association with her performance at MTV in 1998. Her conduit was also addressed. In Profiles of Female Genius (1994), editor compared that "if nothing else, she is honest" with her reflection, describing that despite she is offensive and appear sacrilegious to most people, he believes she is "more honest than many women see walking the streets of the world with crucifixes". Journalists Andrew Breitbart and Mark Ebner called Madonna, the "Mother Superior of perpetual self-indulgence". In the late-twentieth century, American journalist Pete Hamill even considered her "a good Christian".

==== Some Madonna's responses and others interpretations ====
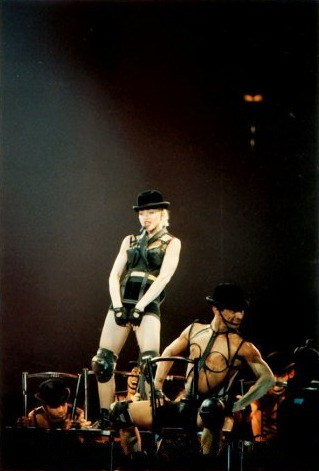
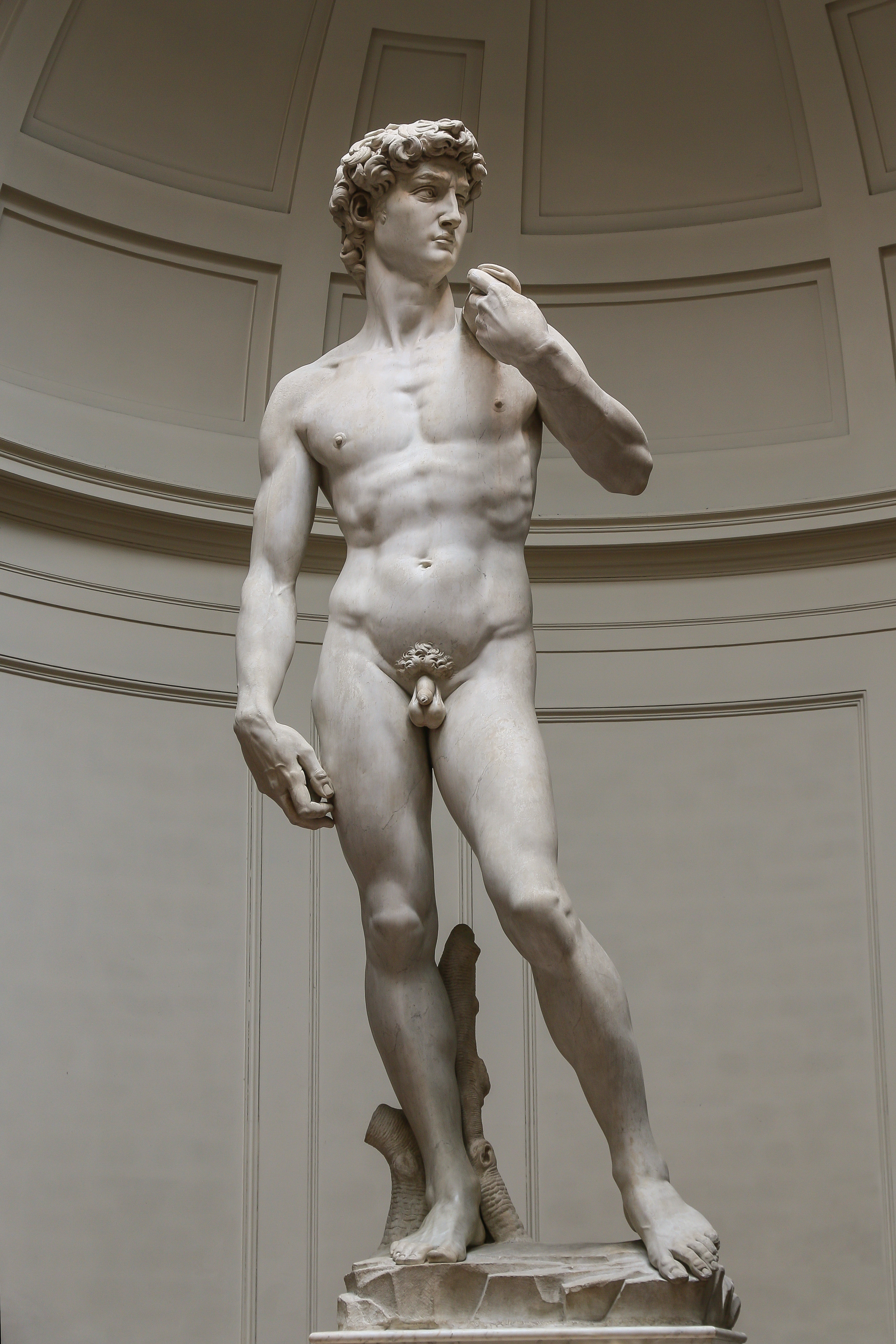
Madonna during the Blond Ambition World Tour, a tour notably for fusing erotism and religious imagery. It received a controversial reception in the sector. Her response was "to provoke thoughts". The theatrical display was compared to observers like Mary Gabriel, as a twentieth-century version of the "fusion of religious and erotic imagery in Italian art [old as the Renaissance]". In the image, an example of Renaissance's religious Italian art (David by Michelangelo).

Some of Madonna's statements as responses to controversies were documented. During the Blond Ambition World Tour, she invited the clergy of Vatican to attend the concert and "judge for themselves", while stated that her show was a "theatrical presentation of my music, and like theater, it ask questions, provokes thought [...]" and that the moral also include "believe in freedom and in God". As one of her most controversial performances, she claimed about her stage crucifixion in the Confessions Tour, that her performance was "neither anti-Christian, sacrilegious or blasphemous" and "it is not different than a persona wearing a cross". However, during her MDNA Tour in 2012, she released a manifesto, about the violent iconography used in the concerts, with her own social criticism and convictions, including to "stop the lies and hypocrisy of the church".

In 2018, Justin Ravitz from entertainment website Refinery29, labeled her as maybe one of the most famous Catholics in the world, and remarked her relationship and response to Catholicism, as a "confrontational and provocative" from the jump. Feminist scholar Camille Paglia described Madonna in 1991, as "the latest atavistic discoverer of the pagan heart of Catholicism". According to Premier Christian in 2015, her shows of the Rebel Heart Tour were accused of "Catholic-bashing" and for which Catholic League's Bill Donohue, said that her "anti-Catholic performances" are for her, and her fans, "a one thing that never gets old".

For others, according to National World's Molly Paul, both her actions and religious themes may have crossed the line one "too many times". After her usage of Revelation 2:9's term of Synagogue of Satan, in the remix "Justify my Love" ("The Beast Within"), whom rabbi Abraham Cooper labeled as antisemitism, or "Jew as Devil", Madonna responded through her publicist according to the Associated Press.

== Madonna and metaphors ==
Reviewers have noted how Madonna was analogously described with emic religious words and terms from some faith traditions or religious mythical folklore, both for concerns or as a metaphor.

American author Boyé Lafayette De Mente noted how "millions" regarded her as an anti-Christ for "frequently profaning religious symbols". According to Seventh-day Adventist magazine Sings of the Times, some have adopted an alienated view of Madonna as the Great Whore of Babylon. Guilbert, also pointed out that she "projects the eternal image of the Babylon prostitute".

Parallels to a cult following were also defined. From general perspectives, authors of Global Perspectives on Sports and Christianity (2017), explains that in the literature of fandoms, studiers use religious metaphors, further comparing that a fan club could be considered a "modern and secularized version of a religious group"; they also mentioned Madonna's case, while Lee Barron in Celebrity Cultures: An Introduction (2014), explains that "for many commentators", a celebrity can be read in a religious manner, whereby they are perceived to be figures worthy of "worship", although offering no salvation, he adds, as well also for their "religious endorsements" such as Tom Cruise (Scientology) or Madonna (Kabbalah). Academic Leo Braudy, in The Frenzy of Renown: Fame and Its History, traces the modern history of fame from medieval "glorification" of saints, through "creative artists" of the Renaissance and to "modern's performers" such as Madonna and Michael Jackson.

Guilbert compared her "own cult" with that of a "goddess and priestess". In The Family, Civil Society, and the State (1998), both the "devotion" to Madonna and the madonna, was compared as "exertions of the same right". After the announcement of her first concert in Mexico, in 1993, some called her an "enemy" of Our Lady of Guadalupe. In 2008, American journalist Ricardo Baca commented how some even considered her as a "divine creation", describing Madonna for pushing trends, including religious ones over the past 25 years. E. San Juan Jr. cites a biographer whom described in the early 1990s, "millions pray at the altar of Madonna, Our Lady of Perpetual Promotion". Kate Racculia even referred in her novel Tuesday Mooney Talks to Ghosts: An Adventure (2019), to the "altar of Our Lady Madonna Louise of Ciccone", telling part of the story of "Dex". In The Power of Madonna, character Sue Sylvester also looks up to Madonna as a concept/deity. "A figure as disturbing as she is sacred", commented Olivier Bouchara from Vanity Fair France in 2023.

Some other secularized nicknames, include according to observers such as The New York Times's correspondent, Ann Powers in 1998, "secular goddess" designated by "audience and pundits". In 2016, professor Abigail Gardner, similarly stated that she "has been referred to as a modern pop goddess". Moreover, art historian Kyra Belán also noted in The Virgin in Art (2018), that "some" have called Madonna as "The Holy Mother of Pop". In 2006, Ottawa Citizen's Dunlevy, T'cha discussed and referred to her as the "matron saint of pop music". Others have referred to her as the "high priestess of pop", and journalists like Julián Ruiz from El Mundo called her as "Our Lady".

=== Case of word "icon" ===
The term "iconography" would pass into high culture, and later in the twentieth century, into popular culture, where "icon" refers to a secular celebrity such as Madonna.

— Historians Asa Briggs and Peter Burke (2009).

Madonna was both defined and discussed as an "icon", a word of religious overtones. Günter Leypoldt, Universität Heidelberg professor of American literature, lumped her with other three examples as "obvious" illustrations of "cultural icon", further citing Oxford English Dictionary's 2009 definition of "icon". "Thus, if researchers, journalists, or everyday conversationalists were to call [...] Madonna a cultural icon, they may not be saying just that she is a striking image but that as a culture, we have invested her with a sacred status that any of her images carry", wrote author of Sexualities and Popular Culture (1998).

In Language, Society, and New Media: Sociolinguistics by semiotician Marcel Danesi, is documented that the word "icon" is a "term of religious origin" and "arguably used for the first time in celebrity culture to describe the American pop singer Madonna". The following description asserts that this word is "now used in reference to any widely known celebrity, male or female". Madonna's name was used as an illustration of its new meaning in reference works such as the Oxford Advanced Learner's Dictionary and Diccionario panhispánico de dudas. Having mentioned the case of Madonna, Guy Babineau from Xtra Magazine stated in 2008: "I'm old enough to remember when people weren't called icons".

Over years, while mentioning Madonna but some reacted no impressive, a number of scholars have illustrated how the word "icon" became more popular for cultural terms, instead of religion and art history, including Keyan Tomaselli and David H. T. Scott in Cultural Icons (2009), and authors of Handbook of Research on Consumption, Media, and Popular Culture in the Global Age (2019), where they used the analogy between Madonna and the Virgin Mary. According to scholar Ana Wortman, in the Latin American Council of Social Sciences (2007), she achieved status of "cultural object" in the sense of cultural anthropology. Therefore, Wortman believes that some people wear her image on a T-shirt as a cultural artifact.

==== Background and author interpretations ====
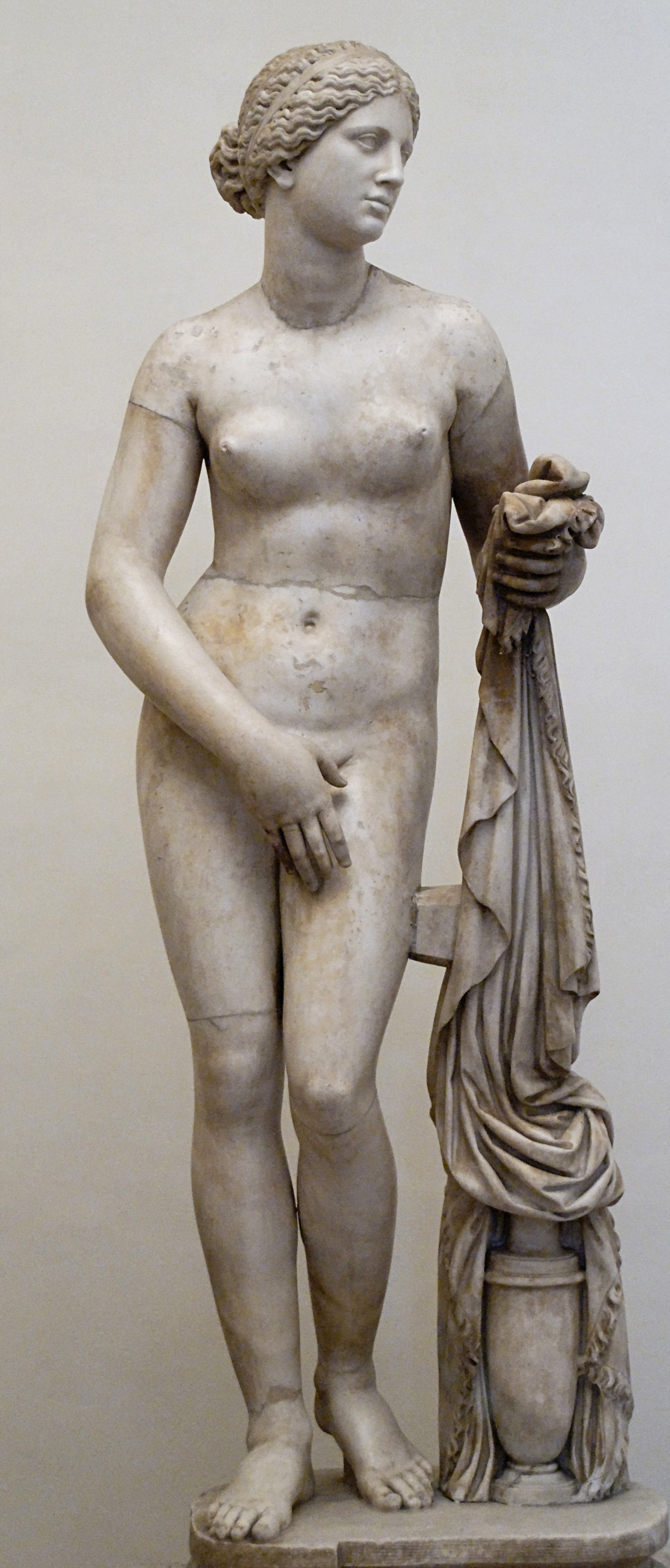
Madonna was compared by some to other "icons"/ancient goddess like Aphrodite.

Danesi stated that calling Madonna an "icon" was also a result of the irony of her name. Broadly, associated professor Diane Pecknold, in American Icons (2006), explains that "many contemporary observers contended that from the very beginning of her career, Madonna's main ambition was to become an icon and that pop music simply provided the most convenient avenue for attaining that goal". She "appeared as challenging twentieth-century image of an ancient icon", wrote Lucy O'Brien in Madonna: Like an Icon (2007). In a similar connotation, Gardner also wrote that "she has appeared as a modern incarnation of an ancient icon", comparing her to ancient mythical goddesses like Aphrodite. Others like John Izod, as Guilbert says, called her a trickster, comparing Madonna with a sort of Great Goddess icons, ranging from Demeter to Athena, Artemis and mostly Aphrodite, who said is "the one who fits Madonna bests".

For Madonna, as Rodrigo Fresán quotes, an icon is when people start to unrealistically identify with them or hate for "all the wrong reasons". In the 1990s, scholar Camille Paglia called her an "important icon", while Rolling Stone staffers, named her a "living icon". In the mid-2010s, Naomi Fry copy chief of T: The New York Times Style Magazine deemed her the "most iconic of icons", and Erica Russell from MTV commented that she has both defined and redefined what it means to be an icon.

=== Depictions and controversies ===
Some depictions of Madonna within a religious connotation

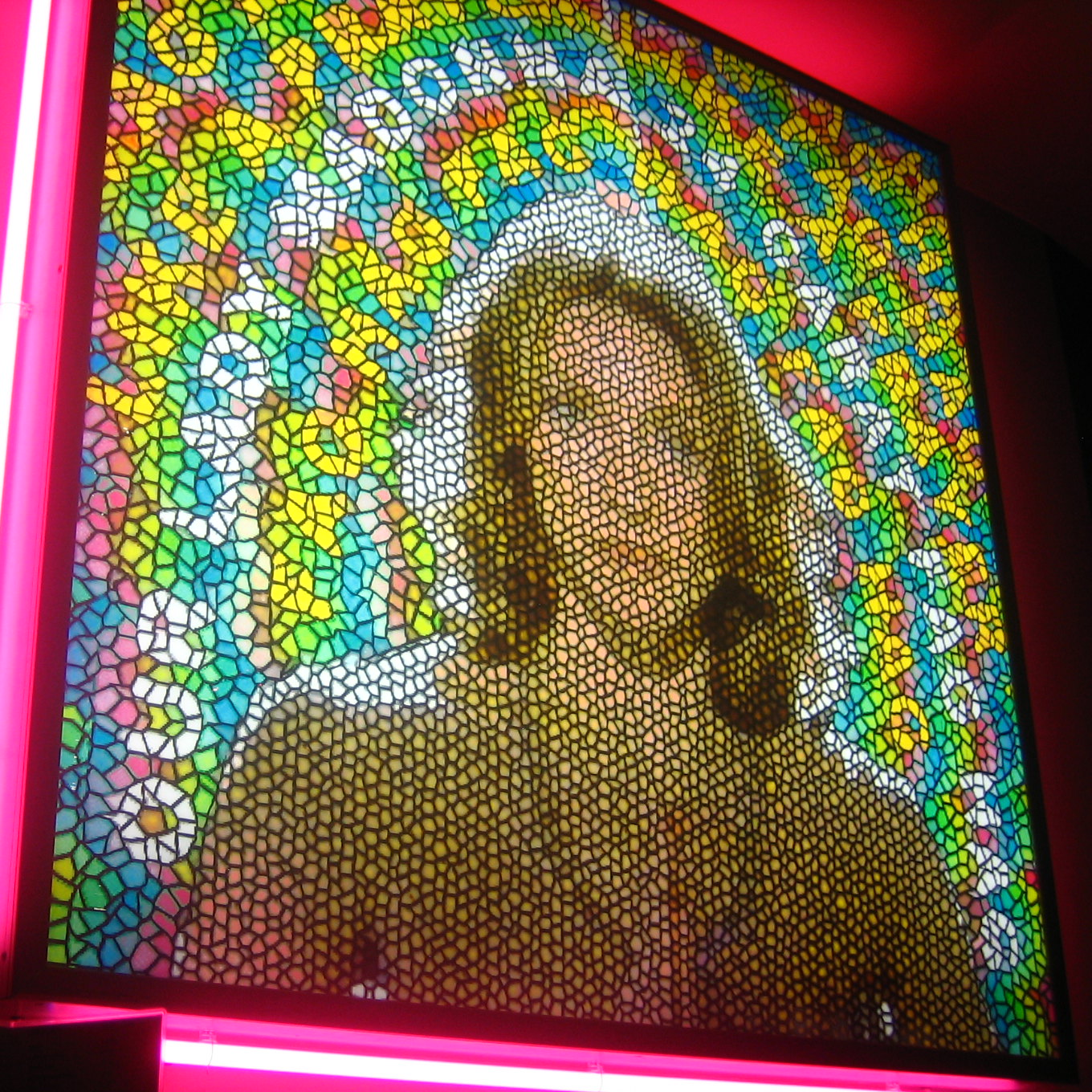
A mosaic depicting a Madonna praying. Photographed by Jeremy Keith.

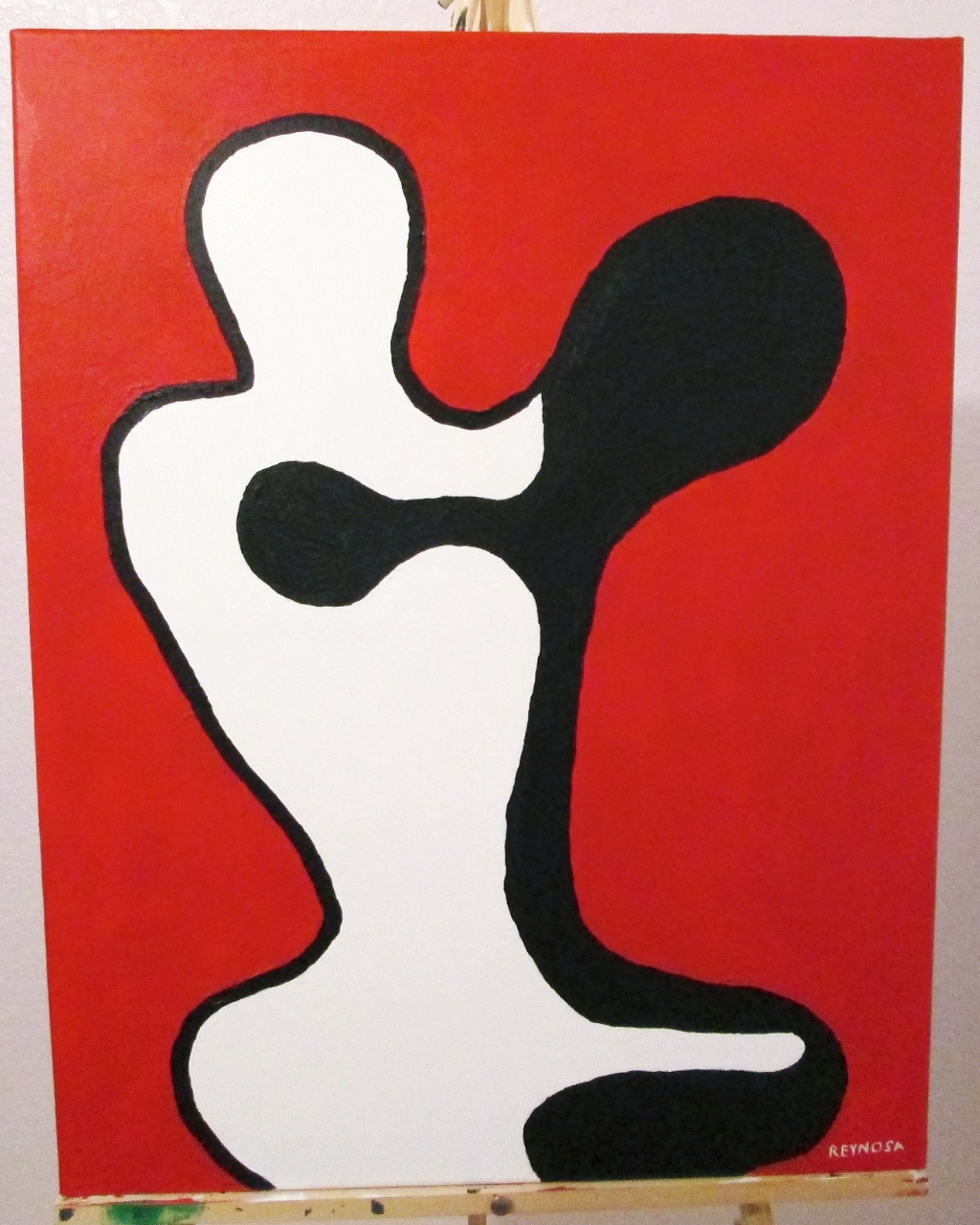
Peter Reynosa's painting Madonna and God in Mystical Oneness depicts a Madonna practicing Kabbalah.

"Religion appears in popular culture and popular culture appears in religion", according to the editors of The Columbia Documentary History of Religion in America Since 1945 (2005). They also mentioned Madonna.

A cover depicting Madonna as Our Lady of Czestochowa was featured in Polish magazine Machina in 2006, which was criticized by some like Jasna Góra Monastery's paulinians. Although the magazine stressed it was to show how some popstars "have achieved cult status and are often referred to as icons". A similar situation occurred in Florida, United States circa 1995, when a bus featured an advertisement of Madonna over a Virgin Mary iconography and caused Catholic League's reactions. A 19th century Virgin Mary icon located in a street of Italy's Rome was overlapping with Madonna's face. An assistant art professor from the University of Tampa, used Madonna and Elvis Presley in an exhibition displayed in Italy to show how popular culture "is becoming a religion for some people".

Italian Ursuline nun, Sister Cristina made her musical debut in 2014, covering the song "Like a Virgin", as "a testimony of God's capacity to turn all things into something new". In an interview with Catholic daily L'Avvenire, Cristina further expressed that she made it "without any intention of being provocative or scandalous", as well as applying spiritual variety. She later gave a copy of her album to Pope Francis. According to medievalists Richard Utz and Jesse G. Swan, in The Year's Work in Medievalism, 2002, Madonna is mentioned in Supernatural Visions (1991), where she is described as "both the incorrigible Whore of Babylon and the simple sinner".

Madonna was name-checked in some religious dialogues. Shaul Magid, a religious scholar, wrote in American Post-Judaism (2013), heard about rabbis in Reform and Conservative synagogues citing in their discourses, the singer, Homer, Plato, Buddha, Muhammad, Gandhi, Martin Luther King Jr. or the Dalai Lama. "This is as if we tried to enter into a dialogue with Catholics, and for this purpose we invite the Pope and pop star Madonna", echoed German academic Christian Joppke from a religious Muslim leader, objecting to the participation of feminist Muslim critics at the first German Islam Conference in September 2006.

== Impact in popular culture ==
American professor Arthur Asa Berger described that she has raised many questions about religion. The advent of music video "Like a Prayer" marked alone, to inspire "leading" cultural studies theorists, musicologists, and philosophers, from Susan McClary to Mark C. Taylor to explore new ways of addressing works' religious meanings, according to authors of Religion and Popular Culture (2016).

Less impressed have been the authors who compared the influence of popular culture as a whole with a perceived decline of some religious ideologies, or particularly Catholicism, but put Madonna within the cultural industry. In Edward Said and the Religious Effects of Culture (2000), William David Hart, addressed Edward Said and Theodor W. Adorno perspectives of ideologies. He uses the singer, as many people know about her, but "have not a clue" about who the Sistine is. Joel Martin in Screening The Sacred (2018), also said that religion has become a simple one topic, and not a particularly one. He perceives that critics, seem to assume that religion has declined in importance in the modern age of advanced capitalism, and the critical action is elsewhere—with Madonna, not the madonna—. Graham Howes, a sociologist of religion, explored in The Art of the Sacred (2006), the "altered" meanings, describing "a strong case could be made for the dominant imagery of contemporary Western culture being neither primarily visual nor verbal but essentially audiovisual —the singer Madonna, rather than the madonna—. In Changing Fashion (2007), authors commented "nothing is sacred, everything is marketable"; they also mentioned Madonna within the book.

=== Entertainment industry ===
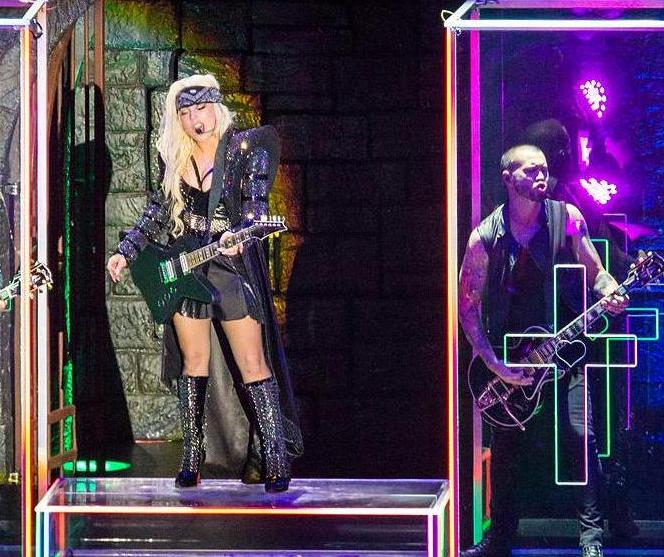
Although challenging artistic/thematic display of religion have been present before Madonna in entertainment industry, secular and religious press would later compare other artists' works with Madonna, including Lady Gaga (pictured).

Cady Lang from Time stated in 2018, her "obsession with her Catholic upbringing has undeniably shaped both the pop culture and fashion landscape". "For the first time in mainstream culture", she brought religious symbolism into pop music, said Gail Walker from Belfast Telegraph. Stewart Hoover, a scholar of religious studies, asserts that Madonna "pushed new boundaries in bringing traditional religious imagery into the popular music context".

Scholars in Queer Religion (2011), wrote: "Since Madonna's time in the media spotlight, we are several cultural cycles removed from the idea that traditional religious imagery points directly and unambiguously to the divine". Media Events in a Global Age (2009) similarly argued that "her use and manipulation of Christian symbolism unleashed a new trajectory of meanings and associations for those symbols quite outside the control and purview of institutional religious authority, much to the chagrin of religion leaders". Some perceived an influence on other entertainers; according to Nelson George, Blackout by Britney Spears "contains some direct Madonna references", with the CD booklet photo showing Spears sitting on a priest's lap. In decrying Lady Gaga's mimicry of Madonna, Bill Donohue president of the US Catholic League acknowledges that "religious" symbolism already has an autonomous, secular system of meaning in popular culture. Catholic theologian Tom Beaudoin, whom described Madonna's "Like a Prayer" video as "irreverent spirituality", argues in Virtual Faith (1998) that "pop music has become the amniotic fluid of contemporary society. It is the place where we work out our spirituality".

In 1999, Erik Davis considered Madonna as "just the tip of the iceberg" in his description that "pop music has always percolated with weird religious energies". Australian music journalist Craig Mathieson, wrote for The Canberra Times in 2016, that "it was Madonna who summed up the way pop music intertwines the secular and spiritual".

==== Fashion ====
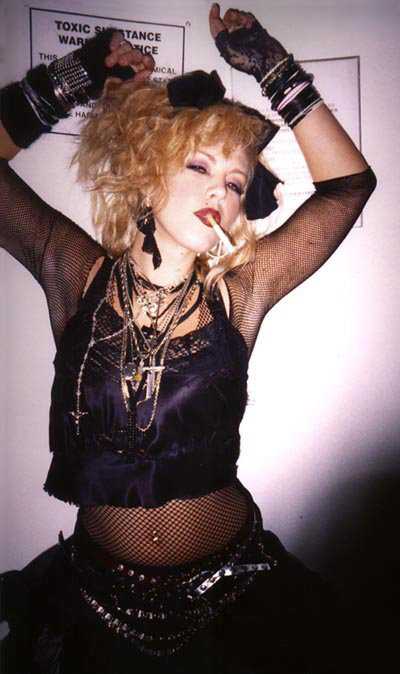
A woman channeling the Madonna wannabe style, which incorporated crucifixes as a fashion item

Lynn Neal, assistant professor of religious studies at Wake Forest University, wrote in Religion in Vogue (2019), that despite the criticism from the Christian community toward Madonna, others found her juxtaposition of religious symbols with female sexuality as "fashionable" and sought to emulate her style. In Consumption and Spirituality (2013), academic Linda M. Scott and the other authors, credited Madonna with initiating the trend of using religious emblems typically worn as objects of beauty. The Globe and Mail's Nathalie Atkinson was critical, granting Madonna a major role because religious iconography became "subversive" for the masses since the 1980s, while her style infiltrated high fashion.

Some authors discussed her impact with the usage of crucifixes as a fashion item in her early career; in 1991, Christian writer Graham Cray said "she has made the crucifix a fashion icon". Vogue Italia's Laura Tortora, even thought Madonna was the first to wear crucifixes as fashion accessories. Neal mentioned previous examples, but they generated little commentary and controversy in either the secular or religious press. Due to singer's popularity, Neal said "the most credit" for the popularity of cross jewelry could go to Madonna, further citing an industry insider, whom said her cross "had a noticeable impact". According to authors of The Columbia Documentary History of Religion in America Since 1945 (2005), academics have documented the cross-shaped jewelry inspired by Madonna, might be understood as "a religious symbol that has overtaken the culture". In 1985, minister Donald Wildmon called her "anti-Christian" and "antifamily" for wearing crucifixes as jewelry. Mary Cross also reported that others accused her as "a source of moral contagion" to children and families. Writing for Vanity Fair in 2019, Osman Ahmed, commented that "many of today's" jewelers look to the magpie mash-up of the New Romantics and Madonna in her Like a Virgin phase.

In 2004, BBC informed that after Madonna's use of red string, other celebrities followed suit, such as Britney Spears and Courtney Love. In Changing Fashion (2007), authors said the bracelet saw a surge in sales, with Madonna having been an influence. Editor of Fashion Fads Through American History (2015), also mentioned other adopters that drew publicity, such as Michael Jackson, Demi Moore and Lindsay Lohan.

=== Spiritual practices/traditions ===
Associate professors in Religion and Popular Culture: Rescripting the Sacred (2016), explained that she has been giving credit for opening up new ways to experience and express spirituality and religion. In 2001, Newsday editors also referred to her "Earth Mother"-East Indian looks, inspired a "mini-cottage industry". Similarly, in The Bloomsbury Handbook of Religion and Popular Music (2017) by Christopher Partridge and Marcus Moberg, Madonna is credited with ushering Indochic, and the resignifications of Hindu symbols like the bindi and henna, practices like yoga, meditation and the language Sanskrit as "fashionable and cool" in her generation.

Madonna was among the leading celebrities in popularize the Kabbalah studies. Karen Stollznow, an Australian writer commented that she made it "trendy" in Occident. Author Alison Strobel commented that "Madonna had popularized it to the point where it was simple to find a place to go learn". By 2015, American educator and theologian Robert E. Van Voorst remarked Internet searches for "Madonna" and "Kabbalah" returning more than 695,000 hits on February of that year, and which led him to conclude it "remains strong".

Other publications have particularly explored Madonna's role for bringing yoga to the masses in her generation; from The New York Times to Diario Sur, placing her on frontline compared to others. These sources have exemplified the previous stereotype associated with the subcultural group of hippies. While they were not pleased, in 2004 the Yoga Journal cited a program from E! in which yoga was understood as part of a counterculture and did not officially become a trend followed by the masses until Madonna took it up. In Women, Body, Illness (2003), Madonna is credited with popularizing Ashtanga Yoga as a way to blend spiritual awareness with body fitness. However, yoga guru Sadhguru, was overall critical about textbooks and other sources giving credit to figures like Madonna, and not Shiva (Adiyogi).

== Cultural concerns ==
=== Discussions ===
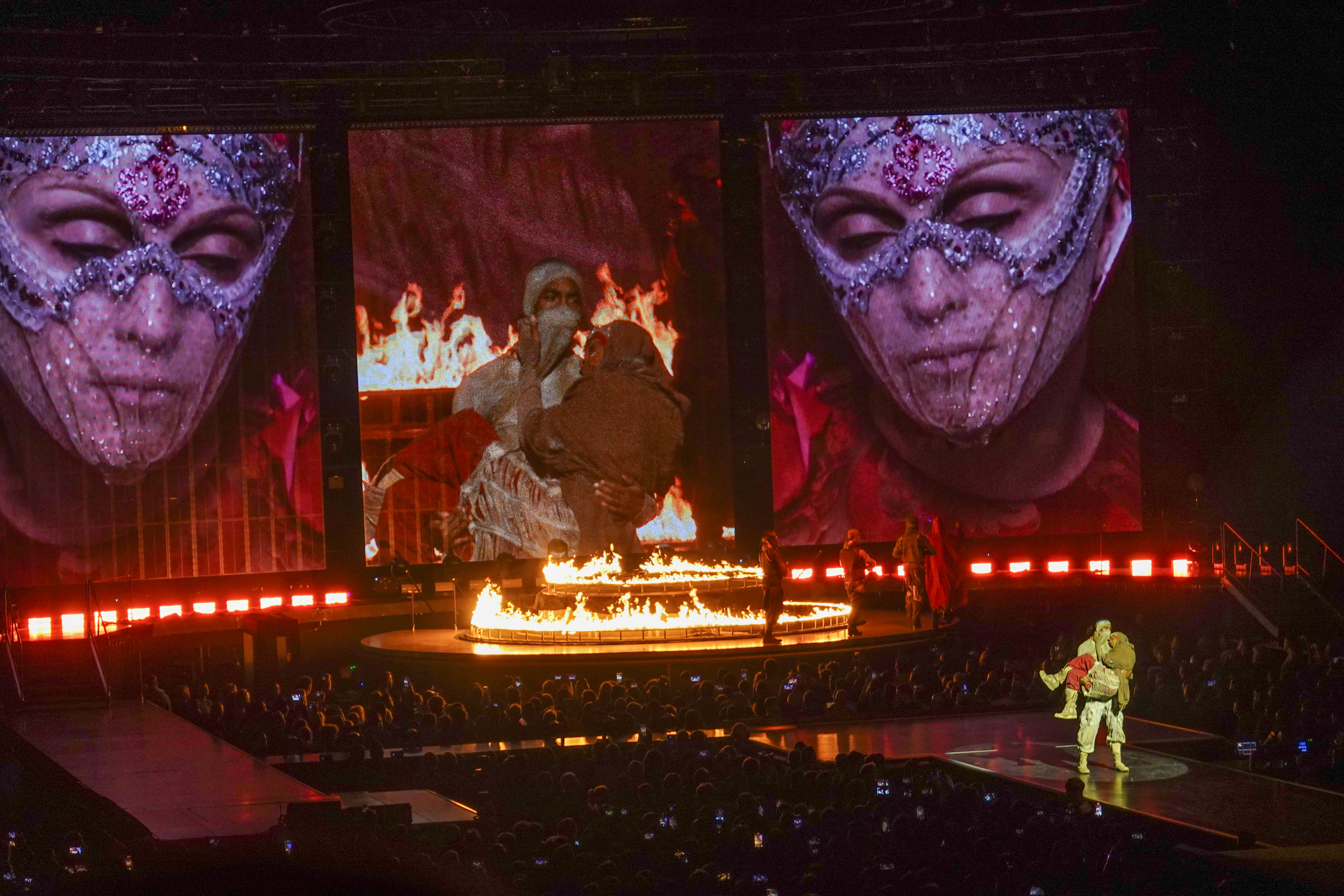
The performance of "Beast Within" in the Celebration Tour (2023—2024), sparked also debate, which is a remix version of "Justify My Love", where Madonna recites an apocalyptic tone from the Book of Revelation, the biblical references such as "murders, fornicators, and liars will burn in a lake of fire". (Revelation 21:8)

Madonna's popularity along with her religion forays and its public reception further worried different societal sectors and imposed cultural concerns. In the 1990s, academic Akbar Ahmed commented that in the cases of Rushdie and Madonna, "numerous overlapping national, intellectual and cultural boundaries are being crossed". In particular, according to sources like National Post, Madonna "has a history of pushing the buttons of the Roman Catholic Church", and British academic Helen Weinreich-Haste says "much has been written about her subversive effect on middle-class and Catholic values".

In 2002, H. T. Spence from Foundations Bible College decried that although the world has written her up as being very philosophical and theological in her presentation, "she is the factual commentary that America has come to a cultural illiteracy". Stephen Prothero put Madonna in context of his interpretation in Religious Literacy (2009), that "many cannot recognize the phrase 'Hail, Mary', except as the name of a football play", and also that many are "unaware" that the singer was "named after someone". In Madonna as Postmodern Myth (2002), French academic Georges-Claude Guilbert captures and perceived a related feeling by saying, "today, America knows more about Madonna than about any passage of the Bible". Sociologist Bryan Turner reviewed Ahmed's words and his emphasis on Madonna, saying:

Madonna [...] is the sign of postmodernism, which is a threat simultaneously to manhood and to truth. However, if Ahmed wants to defend Islam against the threat of a castrating Madonna, then the implication is that Islam is yet another grand narrative which requires protection from the sexual and cultural diversity represented by Madonna, Freddie Mercury and Michael Jackson [...] Secularization is certainly assumed to have brought about a condition of post-history, because there is no shared understanding of the meaning of history. The subterranean erosion of grand narratives by commercial TV, MTV, videos, head-sets and the global catwalk is a serious possibility. In this sense, Ahmed is probably right: the threat to Islam is not the legacy of Jesus, but that of Madonna.

[...] Saudi Arabia, on the other hand, saw no reason to go to war for Madonna, whom many Islamic clergymen regarded as a worse threat than Saddam.

— The New Leader (1995).

Madonna also became one of the entertainers that attracted notable concerns about her spiritual forays. Authors Peter Levenda and Paul Krassner concurred that probably no person of the 1980s and 1990s in the American popular culture represents better the conflicting spiritual forces that Madonna. "Some of the most important and interesting texts in recent U.S. culture which have overlapping concerns with liberations theologies are by Madonna", wrote religious scholar Mark D. Hulsether, in Bruce Forbes's Religion and Popular Culture in America. British-Australian sociologist Bryan Turner explained and commented that popular religion became a component in the industry and Madonna "is the most spectacular illustration of this process". British commentator Melanie Phillips, said that Madonna, Cherie Blair and Princess Diana represent the rise of what Christopher Partridge has termed "occulture". Robert Wuthnow, a studier of sociology of religion, described in Creative Spirituality: The Way of the Artist (2003): "At worst, artists' spirituality is reduced to the commercial exploits of pop-singer Madonna or the cultic followings of the Grateful". In Mediating Faiths (2016), Joy Kooi-Chin Tong wrote that Madonna, Microsoft and McDonald's, represented a "fierce competition" for religious leaders in Singapore to retain their followers' loyalty. Following the release of "Justify My Love", there was a report of graffiti in at least three synagogues and a high school in Ventura County, California, using the phrase "synagogue of Satan" (Revelations 2:9).

=== Israeli visits and Kabbalah studies ===
Madonna concerned some Israelis and Palestinians, during a massive infiltration of the Kabbalah into the public eye; she attended a Kabbalah lecture in Israel during the 2004 Jewish New Year. Her decision to visit Rachel's Tomb was criticized by pro-Palestinian activists, and some protests were made. Agence France-Presse (AFP), informed that she raised questions over the nature of her faith. Goldman commented she received an overwhelming amount of media and government attention, resulting in "unforeseen diplomatic consequences". As a result, Egypt banned Madonna from visiting their country. In an article for The Guardian, Chris McGreal described how Orthodox men chanted shabbos while others yelled at her to go home, accusing Madonna of desecrating their religion. The Jewish agency International Society for Sephardic Progress requested to Yitzhak Kaduri —the maximum authority of Kabbalah in his time— to refuse to bless the singer. Kaduri flatly refused to see Madonna on her pilgrimage to Israel. Madonna was reportedly to further made visits to Israel after 2004, due her study of Kabbalah, but no dragged major public concerns.

The media were also divided. The Jerusalem Post described her as "an open philo-Semite who has done more than many Jews". Giving Madonna and her embrace of Kabbalah the "benefit of the doubt", staffers of the Post declared: "Perhaps Madonna will lead some Jews and others astray and give a rich and sophisticated branch of Judaism a bad name. Perhaps, however, some of the many Jews and others who seek spirituality and community in other quarters, such as Eastern religions, will be inspired to explore what Judaism has to offer". An English-language program in Safed, claimed "Madonna happened to be a vehicle for God". American-born Israeli journalist Yossi Klein Halevi, wrote that for some Jews, "Madonna's endorsement of Jewish mysticisms helps make Judaism attractive to alienated young Jews".

Scholars from the University of Northern Iowa criticized Madonna for turning the multi-thousand year old religious study into entertainment. Kabbalah itself has also raised concerns; British commentator Melanie Phillips described her as "world's most famous proponent of Kabbalah", which she argues is a "modern perversion" of a branch of Jewish mysticism. On the other hand, Rabbi Kerry M. Olitzky believes that her interest in one form of Jewish philosophy spilled over into advocacy for the land of Israel. In 2009, Madonna wrote an article for Yedioth Ahronoth discussing Jewish faith. She declared: "This [study of Kabbalah] appears like I'm Jewish [...] but these rituals are connected to what I describe as the Tree of Life consciousness and have more to do with the idea of being an Israelite, not Jewish. The tribes of Israel existed before the religion of Judaism existed, so you have to do your history".

=== Madonna and dichotomy ===
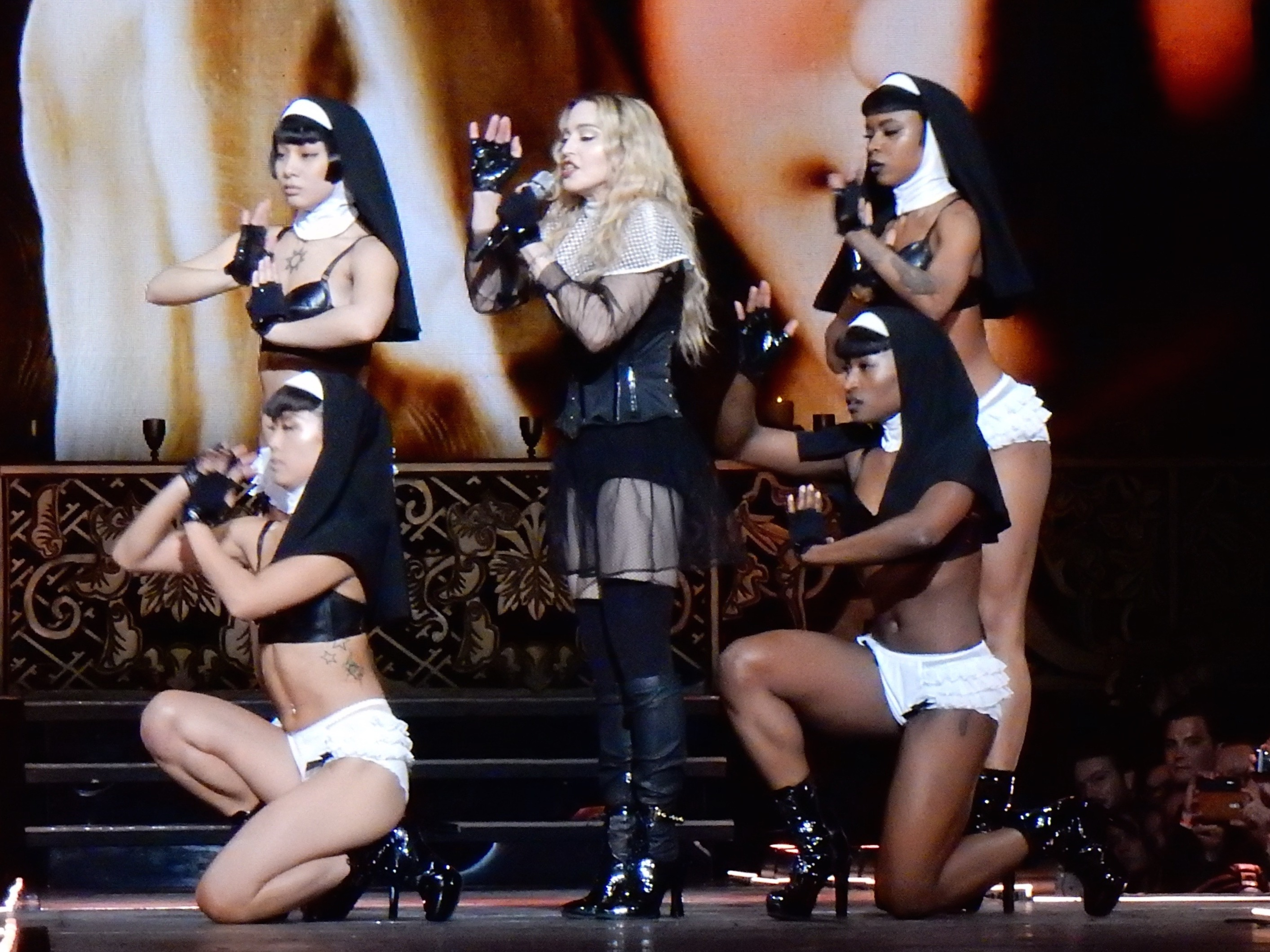
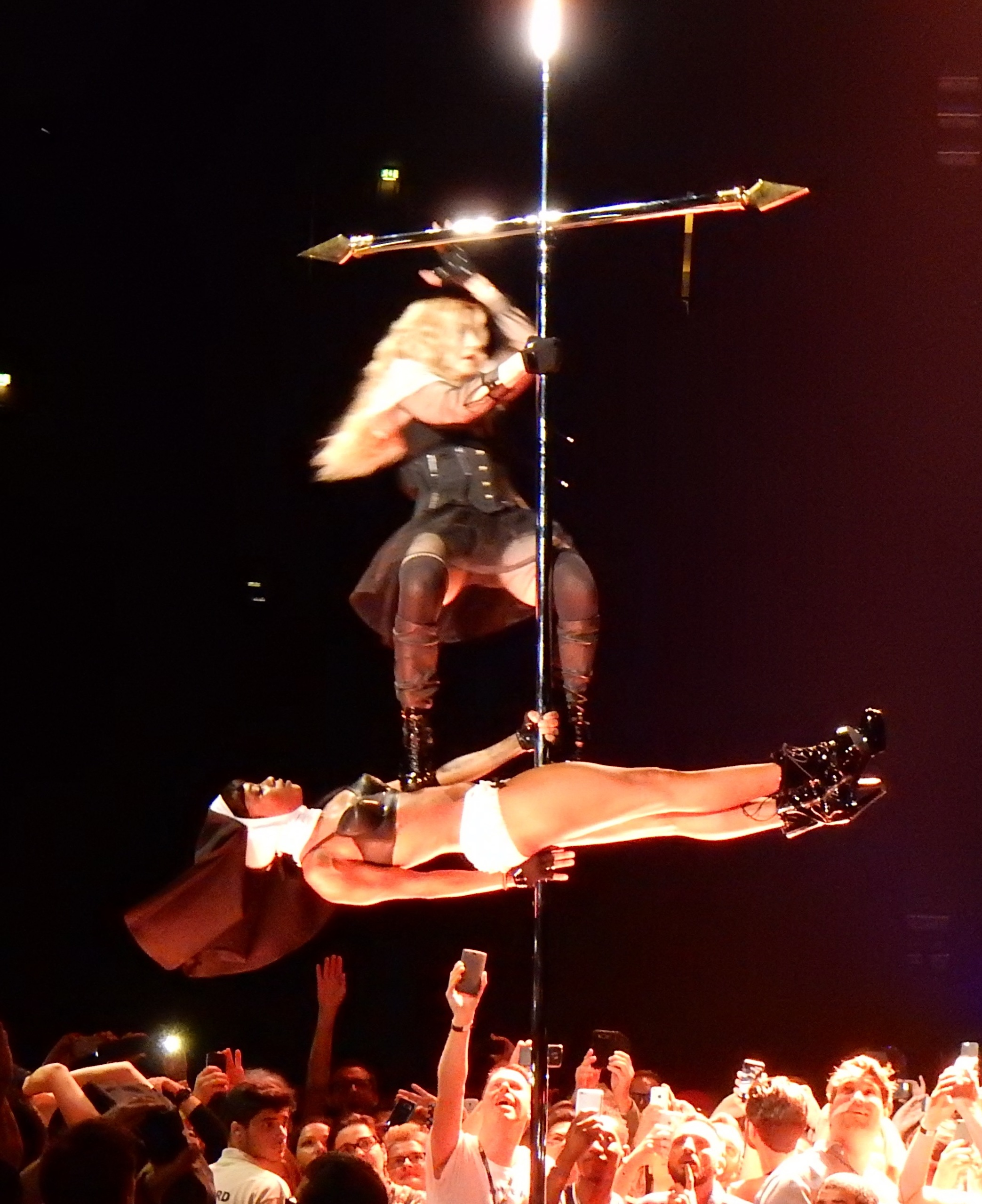
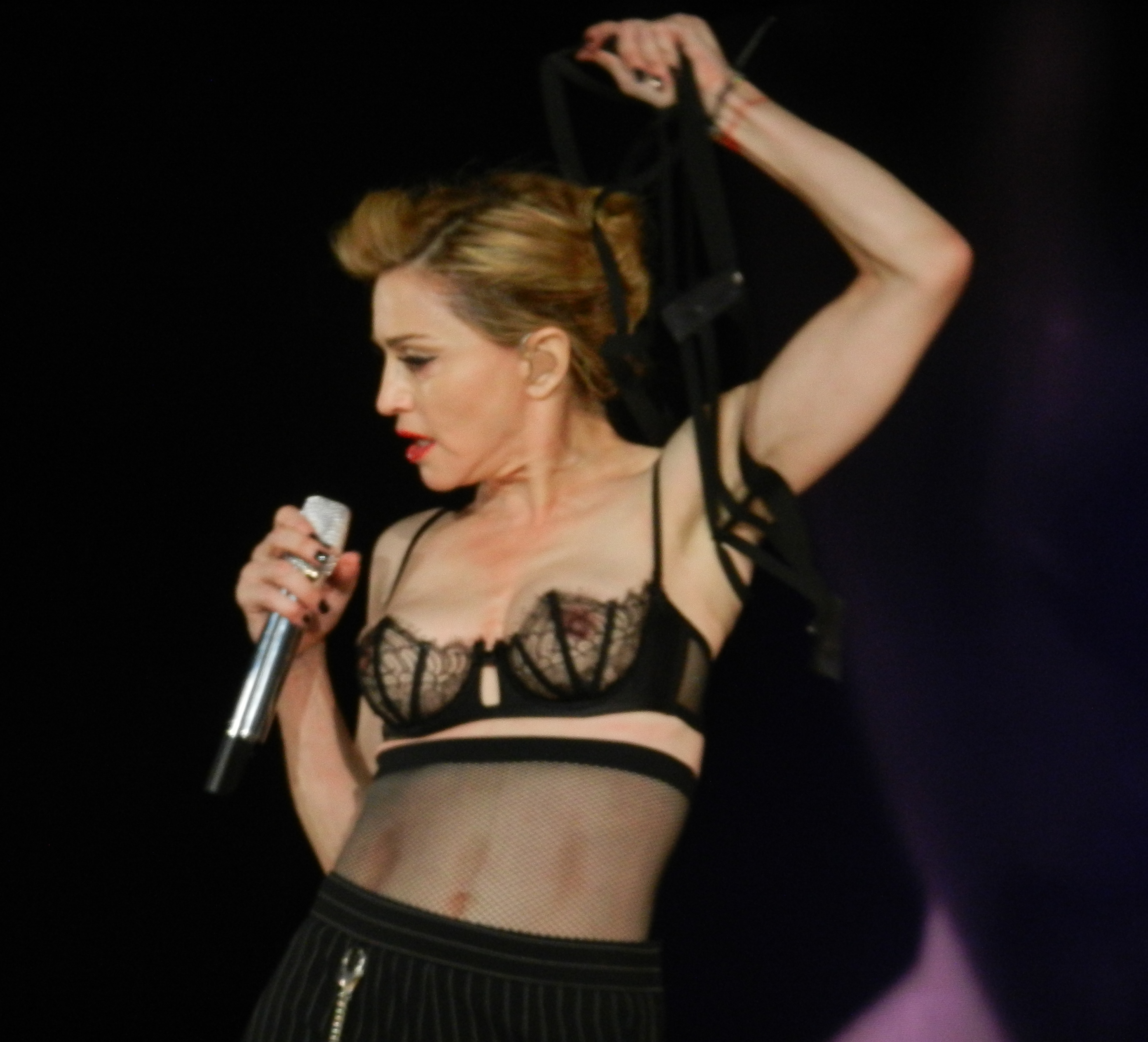
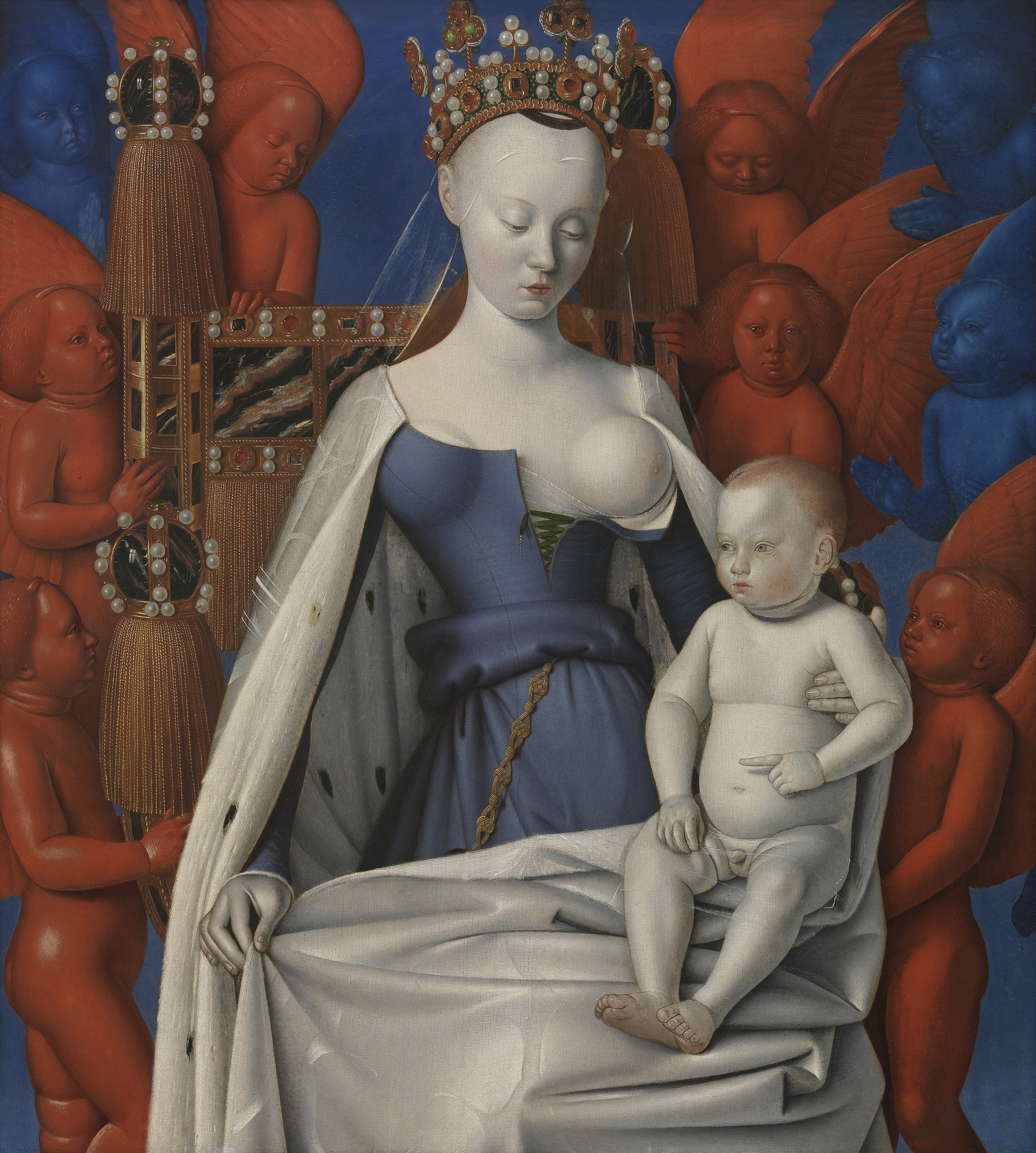
According to some observers, she has artistically displayed the virgin and whore theme. In addition, Madonna was included in History of the Breast (1998) by historian Marilyn Yalom, along with artworks Virgin Lactans, as examples of the female breast through history.

She is one of the world's first performers to "manipulate the juxtaposition of sexual and religious themes", said business theorist Jamie Anderson. Donald C. Miller, considered is "something that set her apart from earlier female performers".

In The Virgin in Art (2018), Kyra Belán felt that she "has successfully fused these antisexual archetypes and made them sexy, a feat not previously achieved by anyone else". Público's Rafa Ruiz, made similar correlations. Conversely, author of Transgressive Corporeality (1995), said that Madonna created "a religion of the simulacrum" by mocking the traditional meaning of the symbols of Catholicism, and reducing them to vehicles for the evocation of sexual feeling. She inscribed her own view of sin exploring her sexuality and religious themes. It influenced others, according to professor Peter Gardella in Innocent Ecstasy (2016). Miller, another supporter of these views, noted her early influence in a substantial number of teenage girls, as Madonna impacted not only their fashion, but their identities and influencing on their life goals and desires. Catholic priest Andrew Greeley, in The Catholic Myth (1997), summed up that for her critics, "it is because she has contaminated religion with sex that Madonna must be condemned".

The central dichotomy she inevitably invokes is that of the virgin and the whore [...] Indeed, many critics have taken her use of religious imagery to be a prime example of what Fredric Jameson calls "blank pastiche": the symbols are seen as detached from their traditional contexts and thus as ceasing to signify.

— Susan McClary

In Kabbalah and Modernity (2010), by professors of religious studies Boaz Huss, Kocku von Stuckrad and researcher Marco Pasi, it is stated that "from the beginning Madonna has presented herself as saint and virgin on the one hand, and as a sinner with inclination to promiscuity" and more that any other artist, Madonna plays with these roles and this way, most interpreters agree she is the "icon" of postmodern self-fashioning. Semiotician Marcel Danesi commented that "perhaps no one has come to symbolize the sacred vs. profane dichotomy more than Madonna". Theologian of gay liberation, Robert Goss described her as an icon whom "has dissolved the boundaries between queer culture and queer faith communities" (also known as gay religion).

Other Madonna's acts were analyzed. M.C. Bodden, an early modern English professor at Jesuit institution, Marquette University, explored the "Madonna prayer" in the film Truth or Dare. Bodden suggested because that scene was replayed hundreds of times in different countries, "Madonna has constituted a new identity for prayer", although it lacks of religiousness. Bodden further describes it as a "floating signifier" that follows what Baudrillard calls "four orders". Sociologist Bryan Turner, as is cited in Religious Commodifications in Asia: Marketing Gods (2007) illustrates:

[...] Popular culture constantly appropriates religious symbols and themes, and that these commercial developments are paradoxical, because they both contribute to the circulation of religious phenomena, but at the same time they challenge traditional, hierarchical forms of religious authority. Madonna in many ways is the principal example of these developments, since she is simultaneously an ironic and iconic figure.

== See also ==
- Sinéad O'Connor on Saturday Night Live
- "Illuminati" (Madonna song)
- Madonna and contemporary arts

== Book sources ==
- Abanes, Richard (2009). Religions of the Stars: What Hollywood Believes and How It Affects You. Baker Books. ISBN 978-1441204455.
- Adogame, Afe; Watson, Nick J.; Parker, Andrew (2017). Global Perspectives on Sports and Christianity. Routledge. ISBN 978-1317573463.
- Ahmed, Akbar S. (2004). Postmodernism and Islam: Predicament and Promise. Psychology Press. ISBN 0415348560.
- Andersen, Robin; Gray, Jonathan Alan (2008). Battleground: The Media. Vol. 2. Greenwood Publishing Group. ISBN 978-0313341670.
- Andersen, Christopher (2015). The Good Son: JFK Jr. and the Mother He Loved. Simon & Schuster. ISBN 978-1476775579.
- Arjana, Sophia Rose (2020). Buying Buddha, Selling Rumi: Orientalism and the Mystical Marketplace. Simon & Schuster. ISBN 978-1786077721.
- Barron, Lee (2014). Celebrity Cultures: An Introduction. SAGE Publications. ISBN 978-1473911352.
- Benstock, Shari; Ferriss, Suzanne (1994). On Fashion. Rutgers University Press. ISBN 0813520339.
- Berger, Arthur Asa (2002). The Art of the Seductress. ISBN 0-595-23077-6.
- Boisvert, Donald L.; Johnson, Jay Emerson (2011). Queer Religion. Vol. 2. ABC-CLIO. ISBN 978-0313353598.
- Belán, Kyra (2018). The Virgin in Art. Parkstone International. ISBN 978-1683255925.
- Bodden, M. C. (2011). Language as the Site of Revolt in Medieval and Early Modern England: Speaking as a Woman. Springer. ISBN 978-0230337657.
- Brand, Benjamin; Rothenberg, David J. (2016). Music and Culture in the Middle Ages and Beyond: Liturgy, Sources, Symbolism. Cambridge University Press. ISBN 978-1107158375.
- Breitbart, Andrew; Ebner, Mark (2004). Hollywood, Interrupted: Insanity Chic in Babylon -- The Case Against Celebrity. John Wiley & Sons. ISBN 0471450510.
- Briggs, Asa; Burke, Peter (2009). A Social History of the Media: From Gutenberg to the Internet. Polity. ISBN 978-0745644943.
- Bucar, Liz (2022). Stealing My Religion: Not Just Any Cultural Appropriation. Harvard University Press. ISBN 978-0674287266.
- Buikema, Rosemarie; Liedeke, Plate; van der Tuin, Iris; Thiele, Kathrin (2009). Doing Gender in Media, Art and Culture. Taylor & Francis. ISBN 978-1-134-00641-0.
- Couldry, Nick; Hepp, Andreas; Krotz, Friedrich (2009). Media Events in a Global Age. Routledge. ISBN 978-1135278540.
- Cross, Mary (2007). Madonna: A Biography. Greenwood Publishing Group. ISBN 978-0313338113.
- Danesi, Marcel (2010). Geeks, Goths, and Gangstas. Canadian Scholars Press. ISBN 978-1551303727.
- Danesi, Marcel (2020). Language, Society, and New Media. Taylor & Francis. ISBN 978-1000048766.
- D'Acierno, Pellegrino; Leonard, George J. (1998). The Italian American Heritage. Taylor & Francis. ISBN 0815303807.
- Detweiler, Craig; Taylor, Barry (2003). A Matrix of Meanings: Finding God in Pop Culture. Baker Academic. ISBN 080102417X.
- Dubin, Steven C. (2013). Arresting Images: Impolitic Art and Uncivil Actions. Routledge. ISBN 978-1135214678.
- Edwards, Katie B. (2015). Rethinking Biblical Literacy. Bloomsbury Publishing. ISBN 978-0567521088.
- E. San Juan Jr. (2002). Racism and Cultural Studies: Critiques of Multiculturalist Ideology and the Politics of Difference. Duke University Press. ISBN 0822383705.
- Ferraro, Thomas J. (2005). Feeling Italian: The Art of Ethnicity in America. NYU Press. ISBN 0814728391.
- Fiske, John (2006). Reading the Popular. Routledge. ISBN 1134897855.
- Forbes, Bruce David; Mahan, Jeffrey H. (2005). Religion and Popular Culture in America: Revised Edition. University of California Press. ISBN 0520246896.
- Freedman, Harry (2019). Kabbalah: Secrecy, Scandal and the Soul. Bloomsbury Publishing. ISBN 978-1472950963.
- Frye, John W. (2010). Jesus the Pastor: Leading Others in the Character and Power of Christ. Zondervan. ISBN 978-0310877684.
- Gallagher, Eugene V.; Willsky-Ciollo, Lydia (2021). New Religions: Emerging Faiths and Religious Cultures in the Modern World. ABC-CLIO. ISBN 978-1440862366.
- Gardella, Peter (2016). Innocent Ecstasy, Updated Edition: How Christianity Gave America an Ethic of Sexual Pleasure. Oxford University Press. ISBN 978-0190609412.
- Gardner, Abigail (2016). 'Rock On': Women, Ageing and Popular Music. Routledge. ISBN 978-1317189091.
- George, Nelson; Carr, Daphne (2008). Best Music Writing 2008. Hachette Books. ISBN 978-0786726127.
- Gillis, Chester (2009). Catholic Faith in America. Infobase Publishing. ISBN 978-1438102528.
- Gleick, Peter H. (2010). Bottled and Sold: The Story Behind Our Obsession with Bottled Water. Island Press. ISBN 978-1597268103.
- Goldman, Shalom (2019). Starstruck in the Promised Land: How the Arts Shaped American Passions about Israel. UNC Press Books. ISBN 978-1469652429.
- Goss, Robert E. (2007). Queering Christ: Beyond JESUS ACTED UP. Wipf and Stock. ISBN 978-1556351617.
- Guilbert, Georges-Claude (2015). Madonna as Postmodern Myth. McFarland. ISBN 978-0-786-48071-5.
- Greenough, Chris (2017). Undoing Theology: Life Stories from Non-normative Christians. SCM Press. ISBN 978-0334056232.
- Greeley, Andrew (1997). The Catholic Myth. Simon & Schuster. ISBN 0684826828.
- Greenspahn, Frederick E. (2011). Jewish Mysticism and Kabbalah: New Insights and Scholarship. NYU Press. ISBN 978-0814732885.
- Hall, Dennis R.; Hall, Susan G. (2006). American Icons. Greenwood Publishing Group. ISBN 0-313-02767-6.
- Hart, William David (2000). Edward Said and the Religious Effects of Culture. Cambridge University Press. ISBN 0521778107.
- Harvey, Paul; Goff, Philip (2005). The Columbia Documentary History of Religion in America Since 1945. Columbia University Press. ISBN 0231118848.
- Holmberg, Carl B. (1998). Sexualities and Popular Culture. SAGE Publishing. ISBN 076190350X.
- Hoover, Stewart M. (2006). Religion in the Media Age. Routledge. ISBN 0-786-48071-8.
- Howes, Graham (2006). The Art of the Sacred: An Introduction to the Aesthetics of Art and Belief. Bloomsbury Publishing. ISBN 0857710613.
- Hughes, Aaron W. (2016). Defining Judaism: A Reader. Routledge. ISBN 978-1134939565.
- Huss, Boaz; Pasi, Marco; von Stuckrad, Kocku (2010). Kabbalah and Modernity: Interpretations, Transformations, Adaptations. Brill Publishers. ISBN 978-9004182875.
- Joppke, Christian (2009). Veil. Polity. ISBN 978-0745643526.
- Judge, Mark (2010). A Tremor of Bliss: Sex, Catholicism, and Rock 'n' Roll. Crown Publishing Group. ISBN 978-0385529518.
- Kimball, Dan (2009). They Like Jesus but Not the Church: Insights from Emerging Generations. Zondervan. ISBN 978-0310298540.
- Kitiarsa, Pattana (2007). Religious Commodifications in Asia: Marketing Gods. Routledge. ISBN 978-1134074457.
- Laderman, Gary; León, Luis (2003). Religion and American Cultures: An Encyclopedia of Traditions, Diversity, and Popular Expressions. Vol. 1. ABC-CLIO. ISBN 157607238X.
- Landrum, Gene N. (1994). Profiles of Female Genius: Thirteen Creative Women who Changed the World. Prometheus Books. ISBN 0-87975-892-9.
- Lafayette De Mente, Boyé (2005). How to Measure the Sexuality of Men & Women by Their Facial Features. Phoenix Books. ISBN 0-914778-78-1.
- Levenda, Peter; Krassner, Paul (2011). Sinister Forces—The Manson Secret: A Grimoire of American Political Witchcraft. TrineDay. ISBN 978-1936296798.
- Lewis, James R. (2003). The Astrology Book: The Encyclopedia of Heavenly Influences. Visible Ink Press. ISBN 1578593018.
- Lofton, Kathryn (2017). Consuming Religion. University of Chicago Press. ISBN 978-0226482125.
- Loy, David (2002). A Buddhist History of the West: Studies in Lack. State University of New York Press. ISBN 079145259X.
- Luqui, Joaquín [in Spanish] (2014). 3, 2 ó 1... Tú y yo lo sabíamos: Las memorias musicales inéditas. Penguin Random House. ISBN 978-8403014244.
- Lynch, Annette; Strauss, Mitchell (2007). Changing Fashion. Berg Publishers. ISBN 978-1847887504.
- MacDonald, Diane L. Prosser (1995). Transgressive Corporeality: The Body, Poststructuralism and the Theological Imagination. SUNY Press. ISBN 0791424871.
- Magid, Shaul (2013). American Post-Judaism: Identity and Renewal in a Postethnic Society. Indiana University Press. ISBN 978-0253008091.
- Marshall, David (1997). Occult Explosion. Autumn House Press. ISBN 1873796684.
- Martin, Joel (2018). Screening The Sacred: Religion, Myth, And Ideology In Popular American Film. Routledge. ISBN 978-0429977022.
- Martin, Walter; Rische, Jill Martin; Gorden, Kurt Van; Rische, Kevin (2008). The Kingdom of the Occult. Thomas Nelson. ISBN 978-1418589837.
- Merkl, Peter H. (2019). Encounters With The Contemporary Radical Right. Routledge. ISBN 978-0429719509.
- Miller, Donald C. (2018). Coming of Age in Popular Culture: Teenagers, Adolescence, and the Art of Growing Up. ABC-CLIO. ISBN 978-1440840616.
- McClary, Susan (2017). Reading Music: Selected Essays. Routledge. ISBN 978-1351552226.
- Moore, Jennifer Grayer (2015). Fashion Fads Through American History. ABC-CLIO. ISBN 978-1610699020.
- Morgan, Michelle (2015). Madonna. Little, Brown Book Group. ISBN 978-1472119438.
- Morrison, Ewan (2009). Ménage. Random House. ISBN 978-1409078708.
- Moss, Pamela; Dyck, Isabel (2003). Women, Body, Illness: Space and Identity in the Everyday Lives of Women with Chronic Illness. Rowman & Littlefield. ISBN 1461647320.
- Nair-Venugopal, S. (2012). The Gaze of the West and Framings of the East. Springer. ISBN 978-1137009289.
- Neal, Lynn S. (2019). Religion in Vogue: Christianity and Fashion in America. NYU Press. ISBN 978-1479867448.
- O'Brien, Lucy (2018). Madonna: Like an Icon. Bantam Press. ISBN 978-0-593-05547-2.
- Olitzky, Kerry M. (2013). Playlist Judaism: Making Choices for a Vital Future. Rowman & Littlefield. ISBN 978-1566996037.
- Onyinah, Opoku (2022). Apostles and Prophets: The Ministry of Apostles and Prophets throughout the Generations. Wipf and Stock. ISBN 978-1666733334.
- Ostwalt, Conrad (2012). Secular Steeples: Popular Culture and the Religious Imagination. A & C Black. ISBN 978-1441123145.
- Ozlen, Ozgen (2019). Handbook of Research on Consumption, Media, and Popular Culture in the Global Age. Bloomsbury Publishing. ISBN 978-1522584926.
- Partridge, Christopher; Moberg, Marcus (2017). The Bloomsbury Handbook of Religion and Popular Music. Bloomsbury Publishing. ISBN 978-1474237345.
- Peters, Dan; Peters, Steve; Merrill, Cher (1986). What about Christian Rock?. Bethany House. ISBN 0871236729.
- Phillips, Melanie (2011). The World Turned Upside Down: The Global Battle over God, Truth, and Power. Encounter Books. ISBN 978-1594035753.
- Prothero, Stephen (2009). Religious Literacy: What Every American Needs to Know--And Doesn't. HarperCollins. ISBN 978-0061856211.
- Purkiss, John; Royston-Lee, David (2014). Brand You: Turn Your Unique Talents Into A Winning Formula. Pearson Education. ISBN 978-0273779209.
- Racculia, Kate (2019). Tuesday Mooney Talks to Ghosts: An Adventure. Houghton Mifflin Harcourt. ISBN 978-0358023937.
- Redden, Guy (2016). Mediating Faiths: Religion and Socio-Cultural Change in the Twenty-First Century. Routledge. ISBN 978-1317098560.
- Rinallo, Diego; Scott, Linda M.; Maclaran, Pauline (2013). Consumption and Spirituality. Routledge. ISBN 978-0415889117.
- Rolling Stone Press (1997). Madonna, the Rolling stone files. Hyperion. ISBN 0786881542.
- Santana, Richard W.; Erickson, Gregory (2016). Religion and Popular Culture: Rescripting the Sacred. McFarland. ISBN 978-1476627083.
- Sargeant, Kimon Howland (2000). Seeker Churches: Promoting Traditional Religion in a Nontraditional Way. Rutgers University Press. ISBN 0813527872.
- Sexton, Adam (1993). Desperately Seeking Madonna: in search of the meaning of the world's most famous woman. ABC-CLIO. ISBN 0385306881.
- Schenck, Paul C.; Schenck, Robert L. (1993). The Extermination of Christianity: A Tyranny of Consensus. Huntington House. ISBN 1563840510.
- Schwichtenberg, Cathy (1993). The Madonna connection. Westview Press. ISBN 0813313961.
- Sickels, Robert C. (2013). 100 Entertainers Who Changed America: An Encyclopedia of Pop Culture Luminaries. ABC-CLIO. ISBN 978-1598848311.
- Spence, H. T. (2002). Confronting Contemporary Christian Music: A Plain Account of Its History, Philosophy, and Future. Foundations Bible College. ISBN 1882542401.
- Stewart, Katherine (2012). The Good News Club: The Christian Right's Stealth Assault on America's Children. Hachette UK. ISBN 978-1610390507.
- Stephens, Randall J. (2018). The Devil's Music: How Christians Inspired, Condemned, and Embraced Rock 'n' Roll. Harvard University Press. ISBN 978-0674919723.
- Stollznow, Karen (2014). God Bless America. Pitchstone Publishing. ISBN 978-1939578082.
- Strobel, Alison (2011). Worlds Collide. Crown Publishing Group. ISBN 978-0307551535.
- Swan, Jesse G.; Utz, Richard (2003). The Year's Work in Medievalism, 2002. Wipf and Stock Publishers. ISBN 1592443818.
- Taylor, Mark C. (1993). Nots. University of Chicago Press. ISBN 0226791300.
- Tomaselli, Keyan G.; Scott, David H. T. (2009). Cultural Icons. Left Coast Press. ISBN 978-1598743654.
- Turner, Bryan (2002). Orientalism, Postmodernism and Globalism. Routledge. ISBN 1134839413.
- Turner, Bryan; Khondker, Habibul Haque (2010). Globalization East and West. SAGE Publishing. ISBN 978-0-85702-670-5.
- Van Voorst, Robert E. (2016). Anthology of World Scriptures. Cengage. ISBN 978-1305888005.
- Ward, Pete (2019). Celebrity Worship: Media, Religion and Culture. Routledge. ISBN 978-0429994937.
- Weinreich-Haste, Helen (1993). The Sexual Metaphor. Harvester Wheatsheaf. ISBN 0-7108-0246-3.
- West, Christopher (2013). Fill These Hearts: God, Sex, and the Universal Longing. Crown Publishing Group. ISBN 978-0307987143.
- Wilson, Leah (2011). Filled with Glee: The Unauthorized Glee Companion. ReadHowYouWant. ISBN 978-1459609563.
- Winston, Diane (2012). The Oxford Handbook of Religion and the American News Media. Oxford University Press. ISBN 978-0195395068.
- Wolfe, Christopher (1998). The Family, Civil Society, and the State. Rowman & Littlefield. ISBN 0847692256.
- Whiteley, Sheila (2013). Too Much Too Young: Popular Music Age and Gender. Routledge. ISBN 978-1136502293.
- Wuthnow, Robert (2003). Creative Spirituality: The Way of the Artist. University of California Press. ISBN 0520239164.
- Yalom, Marilyn (1998). History of the Breast. Random House Publishing. ISBN 0345388941.
- Zeisler, Andi (2008). Feminism and Pop Culture. Seal Press. ISBN 978-0786726714.
