= Keyan Tomaselli =

Keyan Gray Tomaselli is a South African communication professor and author, currently Professor Emeritus and Fellow at University of KwaZulu-Natal, where he established and operated its Centre for Communication, Media and Society for 29 years until becoming a Distinguished Professor of Humanities at University of Johannesburg. He is also editor of the UKZN-UJ journal Critical Arts: South-North Cultural and Media Studies and co-editor at UJ's journal Journal of African Cinemas. He is also a published author and has been largely collected by libraries.

Besides his more conventional media studies activities, Prof Tomaselli participated in several field trips among the Kalahari San people.
