= Kate Racculia =

American author (born 1980)

- Born: 1980 (age 45–46); Syracuse, New York, U.S.
- Education: University of Buffalo; Emerson College
- Awards: Alex Awards
- Website: kateracculia.com

Kate Racculia (born 1980) is an American author whose novels include Bellweather Rhapsody (Houghton Mifflin Harcourt, 2014), This Must Be the Place (Henry Holt and Company, 2010), and Tuesday Mooney Talks to Ghosts: An Adventure, 2019. Her work has been described as "an artful mix of genres" but she has also been classified as a mystery novelist. She is a 2015 recipient of the Alex Awards.

Bellweather Rhapsody was named a "best book of the summer" by Publishers Weekly in 2015 and won an Alex Award in the same year. This award is given to books written for adults that have special appeal to young adults and is given annually by the American Library Association. The award committee described the book as "[h]igh-school students gather at the isolated Bellweather Hotel for a statewide music festival only to be trapped by a blizzard with an arrogant fingerless conductor, drunken chaperones, a missing corpse, and perhaps the ghosts of long-dead newlyweds."

Racculia was born in 1980 in Syracuse, New York, and currently lives in Bethlehem, Pennsylvania, where she is a member of the Bach Choir of Bethlehem. She is a graduate of both the University of Buffalo and Emerson College. She owns two cats and "wants to be Jessica Fletcher when she grows up".

== Publications ==
- This Must Be The Place. New York: Henry Holt and Co., 2010. ISBN 978-0805092301.
- Bellweather Rhapsody. Boston: Houghton Mifflin Harcourt, 2014. ISBN 978-1-250-03882-1.
- Tuesday Mooney Talks to Ghosts. Boston: Houghton Mifflin Harcourt, 2019. ISBN 978-0358023937
