= Gary Laderman =

Professor of American religious history and cultures

Gary M. Laderman
- Occupations: Academic and author

Academic background
- Education: B.A., Psychology; M.A., History of Religions; PhD, History of Religions
- Alma mater: California State University, Northridge; University of California, Santa Barbara

Gary Michael Laderman is a scholar of religion and culture as well as an author, and academic. He is a professor at Emory University.

Laderman's research has focused on American religious history and culture, examining the cultural and religious dimensions of death, popular religion, and the intersections between psychoactive substances and spirituality. He is a fellow of the American Council of Learned Societies.

== Education ==
Laderman completed a BA (psychology) at CSUN (1986), and an MA (History of Religions) at UC Santa Barbara (1988), followed by a PhD (1994).

== Career ==
Laderman joined the Department of Religion at Emory University in 1994, where he was chair of the department from 2008 to 2019 and also serves as a professor.

Laderman was managing editor of Camera Obscura: A Journal of Feminism and Film Theory between 1991 and 1994. He later co-founded and directed Religion Dispatches. He is also the founder and editor of Sacred Matters Magazine. In addition, he was co-editor of the multivolume encyclopedias Science, Religion, Societies and Religion and American Cultures.

== Research ==
Laderman's research has examined the ways religious life is experienced, expressed, and negotiated in American society. A central theme of his work is the cultural and religious significance of death and mortality in the United States, particularly as reflected in popular culture, media, and ritual practices. Through books such as The Sacred Remains and Rest in Peace, he has analyzed how practices surrounding death functioned as social and cultural expressions that reflected broader values, collective identities, and attitudes toward mortality.

Laderman's book Rest in Peace has been praised for highlighting American attitudes toward death, offering a nuanced and culturally rich view of the funeral industry that challenges clergy to engage meaningfully while also highlighting funerals' role in providing solace. At the same time, historian Robert V. Wells admired its innovation but noted that it sometimes presents funeral directors' perspectives uncritically and is less convincing in defending the industry's claim of simply meeting public demand. His book The Sacred Remains has been described as indispensable, and painstakingly researched, tracing how the Civil War transformed American perceptions of death and funeral practices. However, reviewer Carole Haber observed that, despite its strong discussions, the book suffers at times from limited scope and lack of clarity, while Sara Knox observed its narrower focus on Northern, white Protestant middle classes despite its ambitious title.

Laderman's work has examined death as a cultural and social experience, revealing how American society understands and shapes attitudes toward death. His research also drew on sociological and cultural approaches to religion, including analyses of religion as a system of practices that contributed to social meaning and cohesion.

Beyond the study of death, Laderman's work has explored the presence of religious meaning outside formal institutions, particularly in popular culture and everyday life. In his book titled Sacred Matters: Celebrity Worship, Sexual Ecstasies, the Living Dead, and Other Signs of Religious Life in the United States, he examined how media, entertainment, celebrity culture, and other secular contexts functioned as sites of religious expression and experience. Reviewers Jeremy Rapport and Lynn E. McCutcheon highlighted the book's ambition in locating religion within contemporary forms of devotion and cultural engagement. His research has also addressed the historical and cultural relationships between psychoactive substances and religious or spiritual practices in the United States, as well as the role of spirituality in health and well-being.

== Selected awards ==
- 1998 – Fellowship, American Council of Learned Societies
- 2007 – Fulbright U.S. Scholar, Nagoya American Studies Seminar
- 2009 – Crystal Apple Award for Excellence in Graduate Education and Instruction, Emory University

== Bibliography ==
=== Books ===
- Laderman, Gary (1996). The Sacred Remains: American Attitudes Toward Death, 1799–1883 (1st ed.). Yale University Press. ISBN 9780300078688.
- Laderman, Gary (2003). Rest in Peace: A Cultural History of Death and the Funeral Home in Twentieth-century America. Oxford University Press. ISBN 9780195183559.
- Laderman, Gary (2010). Sacred Matters: Celebrity Worship, Sexual Ecstasies, the Living Dead, and Other Signs of Religious Life in the United States. The New Press. ISBN 9781595584847.
- Laderman, Gary (2012). American Civil Religion: a Fortress Press eTextbook. Fortress Press. ISBN 9781451425598.
- Laderman, Gary (2020). Don't Think About Death: A Memoir on Mortality. Deeds Publishing. ISBN 9781950794126.
- Laderman, Gary (2025). Sacred Drugs: How Psychoactive Substances Mix with Religious Life. Routledge. ISBN 9781003601616.

=== Selected articles ===
- Laderman, Gary (1995). "Locating the Dead: A Cultural History of Death in the Antebellum, Anglo-Protestant Communities of the Northeast". Journal of the American Academy of Religion. 63 (1): 27. doi:10.1093/JAAREL/LXIII.1.27.
- Laderman, Gary (1997). "The Body Politic and the Politics of Two Bodies: Abraham and Mary Todd Lincoln in Death". Prospects. 22: 109–132. doi:10.1017/S0361233300000065.
- Laderman, Gary (2000). "The Disney Way of Death". Journal of the American Academy of Religion. 68 (1): 27–43. doi:10.1093/JAAREL/68.1.27.
- Laderman, Gary (2006). "The Cult of Doctors: Harvey Cushing and the Religious Culture of Modern Medicine". Journal of Religion and Health. 45: 533–548. doi:10.1007/s10943-006-9052-7.
- Laderman, Gary (2007). "Violence and Religious Life: Politics, Culture, and the Sacred in the United States". Nanzan Review of American Studies: A Journal of the Center for American Studies, Nanzan University. 29: 9–22. doi:10.15119/00000152.
