= Thomas Ferraro =

Thomas J. Ferraro is an American non-fiction writer, and Frances Hill Fox Professor of English at Duke University.

== Life ==
He graduated summa cum laude from Amherst College, and earned his Ph.D. at Yale University, where he took the Theron Rockwell Field Prize for Distinguished Humanities Dissertation. He teaches American literature and cultural studies at Duke University, with a special emphasis on Catholicity, immigrant literature, and visual media.

== Awards ==
- 2006 American Book Award, for Feeling Italian: the art of ethnicity in America
- 2010, Alumni Distinguished Undergraduate Teaching Award, Duke's most prestigious undergraduate teaching award
- 2011, Bass Society of Fellows, endowed chair in English for excellence in scholarship and pedagogy

== Works ==
- Werner Sollors, ed. (1989). "Blood in the Marketplace". The Invention of ethnicity. Oxford University Press. p. 176. ISBN 978-0-19-505047-9. "Thomas Ferraro."
- Frank Lentricchia, ed. (1991). "Whole Families Shopping at Night!". New essays on White noise. Cambridge University Press. ISBN 978-0-521-39893-0.
- Ethnic passages: literary immigrants in twentieth-century America. University of Chicago Press. 1993. ISBN 978-0-226-24442-6.
- Feeling Italian: the art of ethnicity in America. New York University Press. 2005. ISBN 978-0-8147-2747-8.

=== Editor ===
- Catholic Lives, Contemporary America. Duke University Press. January 1997. ISBN 978-0-8223-2031-9.
