= Voice of a generation =

Informal honorific title

Voice of a generation is an informal honorific title used by media and the public to describe a person or work of art believed to represent the attitudes, values, or concerns of a particular generation of people. The phrase first appeared in print in the 1882 volume of The Yale Literary Magazine, which proclaimed the hero of Alfred, Lord Tennyson's poem "Ulysses" to be "the voice of a generation". The phrase was later popularized in the 1960s to refer to musician Bob Dylan. It is a honorific nickname in popular music for several artists.

== History ==
British newspaper The Guardian has cited F. Scott Fitzgerald's 1925 novel The Great Gatsby, Bret Easton Ellis and J. D. Salinger's 1951 novel The Catcher in the Rye as early examples of works that were deemed the "voice of a generation". By the 1960s, the phrase was further popularized to refer to musician Bob Dylan, a label which he disliked.

Artists such as the Beatles, Michael Jackson, Kurt Cobain, David Lowery, Ananda Lewis, Trevor Miller, Harmony Korine, Whitney Houston, Christina Aguilera, Declan McKenna, and Dave. The label has also been applied to non-artists such as Vick Hope.

Along with novels such as The Great Gatsby, The Catcher in the Rye, Monkey Grip,

== Politics ==
The March for Our Lives, a protest taking place in the aftermath of the Stoneman Douglas High School shooting in 2018 was described by various media outlets as being led by students and young people. Some even describe it as the political "awakening" of Generation Z or that these protesters were "the voice of a generation on gun control".

== See also ==
- Zeitgeist
