= Honorific nicknames in popular music =

Honorific nicknames are used when describing popular music artists, most often in the media or by fans, to indicate their significance, and are often religious, familial, or most frequently royal and aristocratic titles, used metaphorically. Honorific nicknames were used in classical music in Europe even in the early 19th century, with figures such as Mozart being called "The father of modern music" and Bach "The father of modern piano music". They were also particularly prominent in African-American culture in the post-Civil War era, perhaps as a means of conferring status that had been negated by slavery, and as a result entered early jazz and blues music, including figures such as Duke Ellington and Count Basie.

In U.S. culture, despite its republican constitution and ideology, royal honorific nicknames have been used to describe leading figures in various areas of activity, such as industry, commerce, sports, and the media; father or mother have been used for innovators, and royal titles such as king and queen for dominant figures in a field. In the 1930s and 1940s, as jazz and swing music were gaining popularity, it was the more commercially successful white artists Paul Whiteman and Benny Goodman who became known as "the King of Jazz" and "the King of Swing" respectively, despite there being more highly regarded contemporary African-American artists.

These patterns of naming were transferred to rock and roll when it emerged in the 1950s. There was a series of attempts to find—and a number of claimants to be—the "King of Rock 'n' Roll", a title that became most associated with Elvis Presley. This has been characterized as part of a process of the appropriation of credit for innovation of the then-new music by a white establishment. Different honorifics have been taken or given for other leading figures in the genre, such as "the Architect of Rock and Roll", by Little Richard from the 1990s; this term, like many, is also used for other important figures, in this case including pioneer electric guitarist Les Paul.

Similar honorific nicknames have been given in other genres, including Aretha Franklin, who was crowned the "Queen of Soul" on stage by disk jockey Pervis Spann in 1968. Michael Jackson and Madonna have been closely associated with the terms "King of Pop" and "Queen of Pop" respectively, since the 1980s. Some nicknames have been strongly promulgated and contested by various artists, and occasionally disowned or played down by their subjects. Some notable honorific nicknames are in general usage and commonly identified with particular individuals.

== Individual titles ==
=== A ===
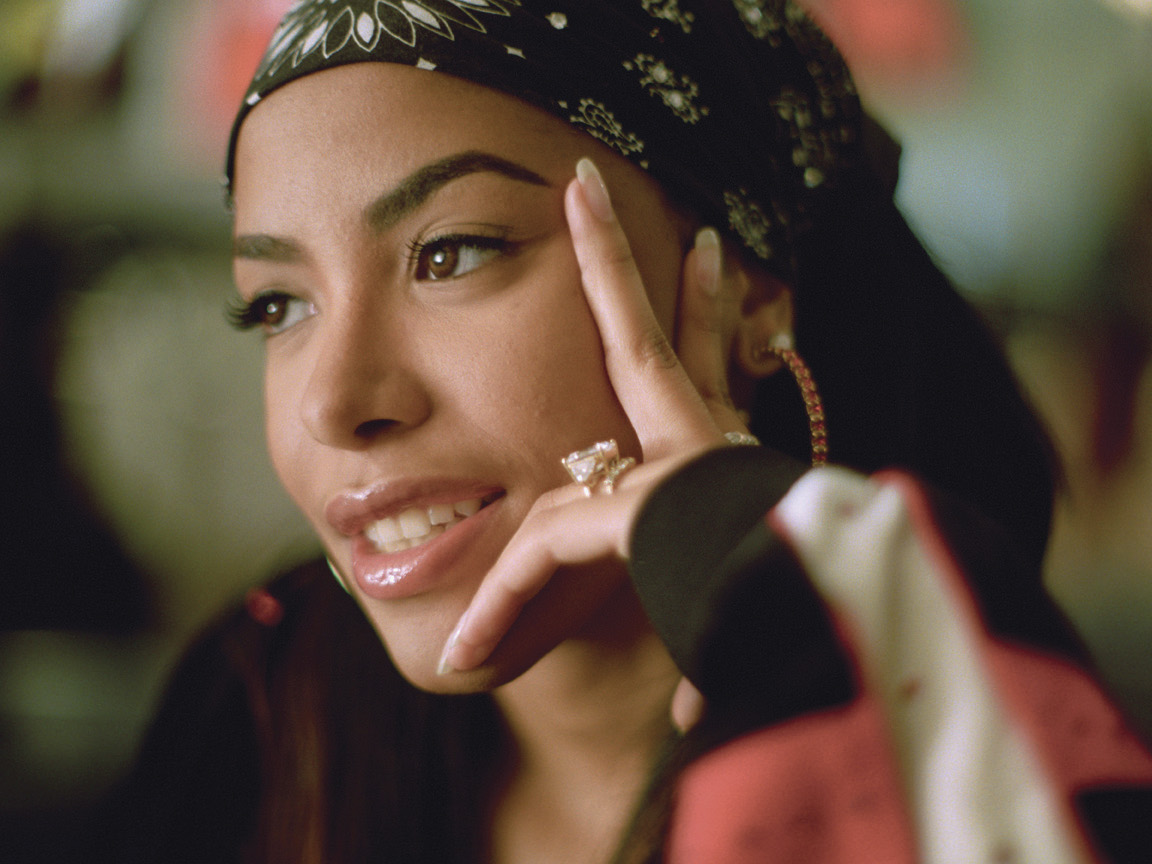
American singer Aaliyah is known as the "Princess of R&B".

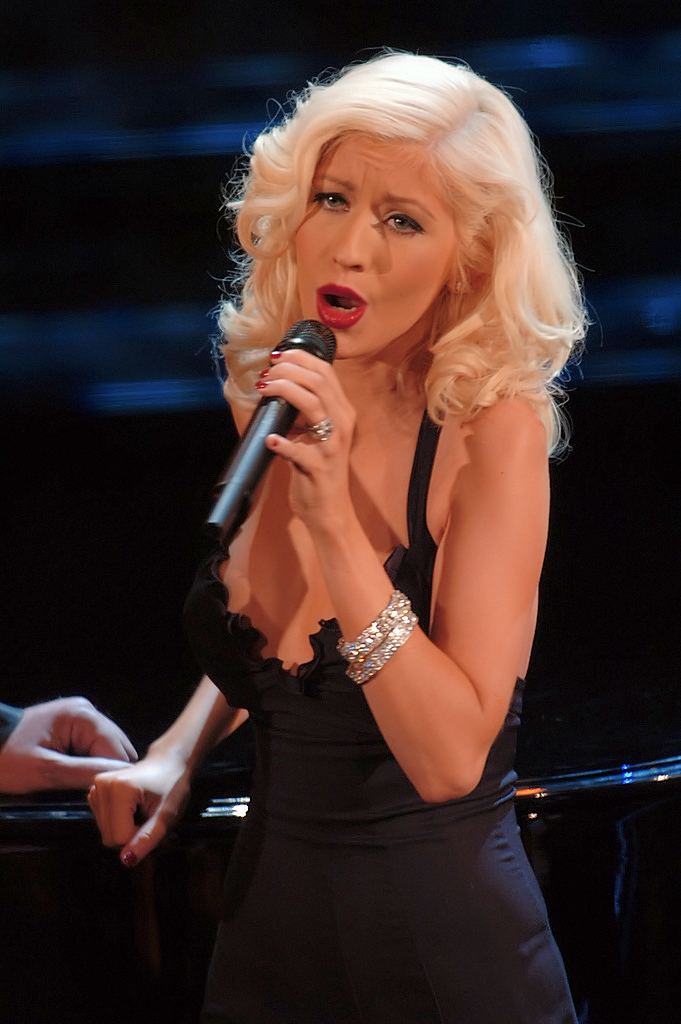
American singer Christina Aguilera is known as the "Voice of a Generation".

Artist	Title	Country	Ref.
Aaliyah	Princess of R&B	United States	
Aaliyah	Queen of Urban Pop	United States	
Lee Aaron	Metal Queen	Canada	
Abrar-ul-Haq	King of Pakistani Pop	Pakistan	
Abrar-ul-Haq	King of Bhangra-Pop	Pakistan	
Christina Aguilera	Voice of a Generation	United States	
Nancy Ajram	Queen of Arab Pop	Lebanon	
Sezen Aksu	Queen of Turkish Pop	Turkey	
Rauw Alejandro	King of Modern Reggaeton	Puerto Rico (US)	
Namie Amuro	Queen of J-pop	Japan	
Anitta	Queen of Brazilian Pop	Brazil	
Anna Carina	Queen of Peruvian Pop	Peru	
Zohar Argov	King of Mizrahi music	Israel	
Louis Armstrong	King of Jazz	United States	
Maki Asakawa	Queen of the Underground	Japan	
Aurora	Fairy of Pop	Norway	
Noriko Awaya	Queen of Blues	Japan	

=== B ===
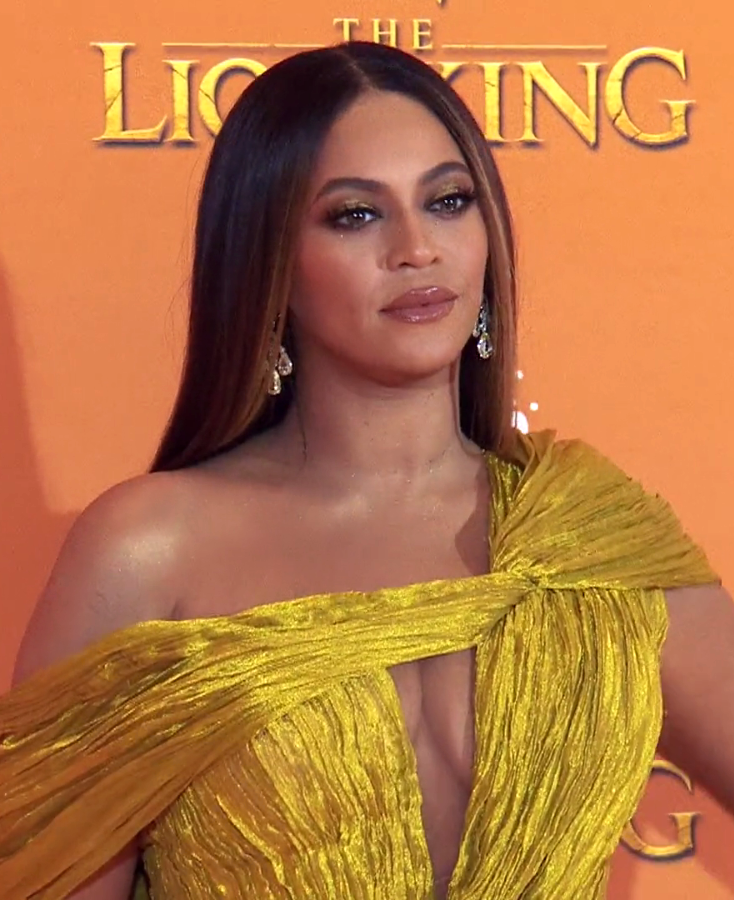
American singer Beyoncé is frequently referred to as "Queen Bey"

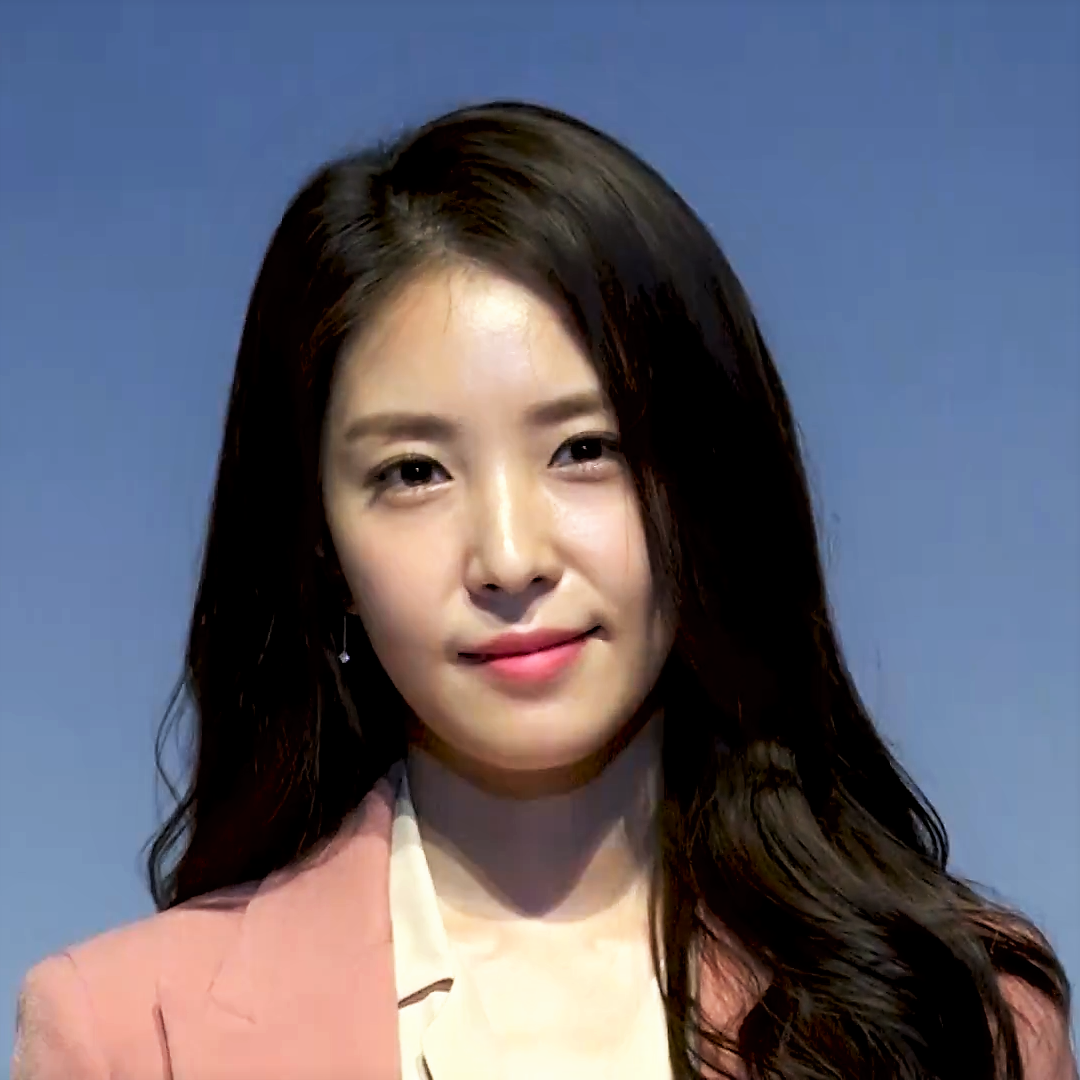
South Korean singer BoA is known as the "Queen of K-pop".

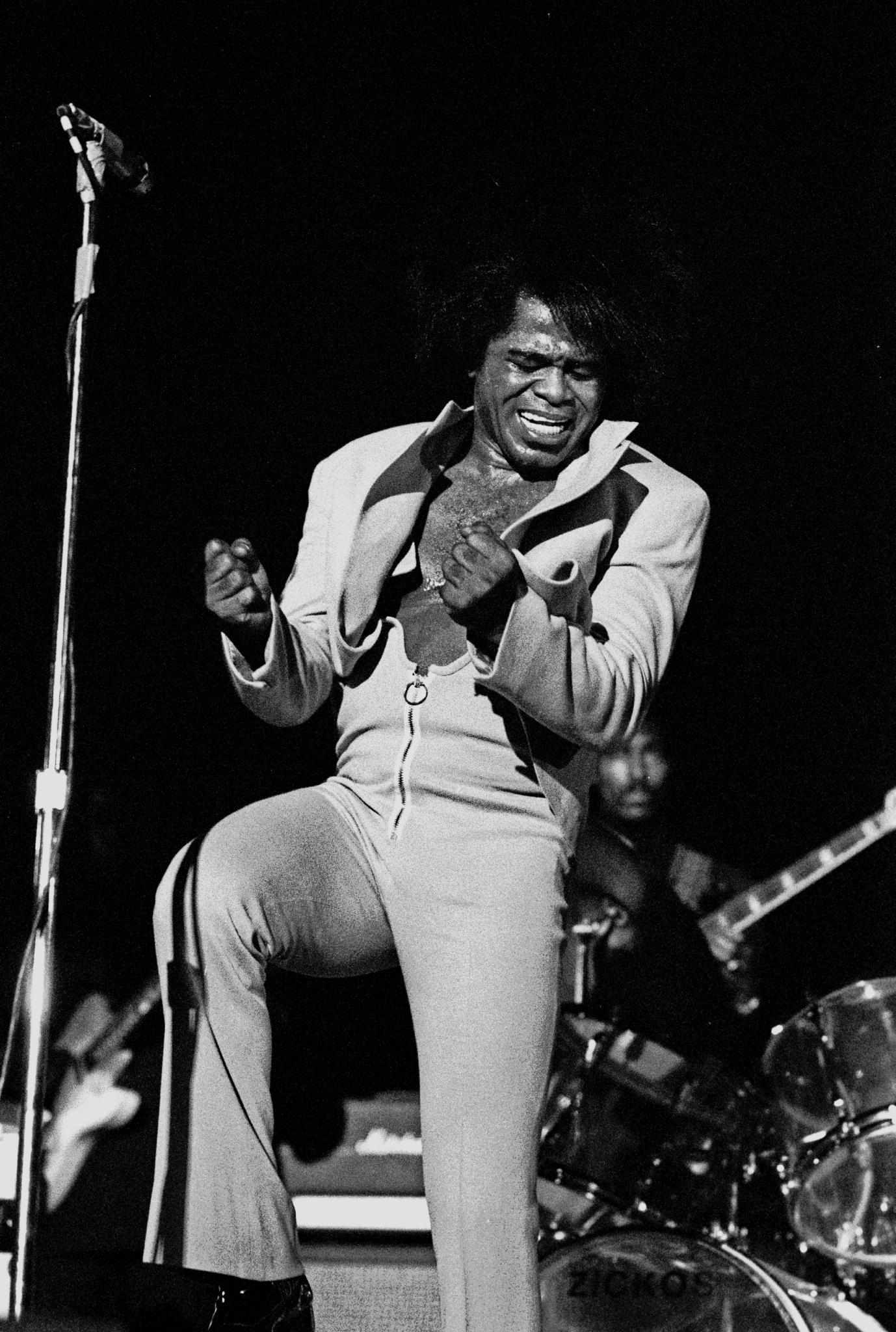
American musician James Brown was known as the "Godfather of Soul".

Artist	Title	Country	Ref.
Bad Bunny	King of Latin Trap	Puerto Rico (US)	
Erykah Badu	Queen of Neo-Soul	United States	
Đorđe Balašević	Panonian Sailor	Yugoslavia/Serbia	
J Balvin	Prince of Reggaeton	Colombia	
Šaban Bajramović	King of Romani Music	Yugoslavia/Serbia	
Šaban Bajramović	King of the Gypsies / Gypsy King	Yugoslavia/Serbia	
Harry Belafonte	King of Calypso	United States	
Mordechai Ben David	King of Jewish Music	United States	
Chuck Berry	Father of Rock and Roll	United States	
Chuck Berry	King of Rock and Roll	United States	
Beyoncé	Queen Bey or Queen B	United States	
Justin Bieber	Prince of Pop	Canada	
Justin Bieber	King of Teen Pop	Canada	
Věra Bílá	Queen of Romany	Czech Republic	
Björk	Queen of Experimental Pop	Iceland	
Mary J. Blige	Queen of Hip Hop Soul	United States	
BoA	Queen of K-pop	South Korea	
David Bowie	Chameleon of Rock	United Kingdom	
Brandy	The Vocal Bible	United States	
Julio Brito	The melodic painter of Cuba	Cuba	
Arthur Brown	The God of Hellfire	United Kingdom	
Chris Brown	King of R&B	United States	
Chuck Brown	Godfather of Go-Go	United States	
Dennis Brown	Crown Prince of Reggae	Jamaica	
James Brown	Godfather of Soul	United States	
Michael Bublé	King of Christmas	Canada	
Solomon Burke	King of Rock 'n' Soul	United States	

=== C ===
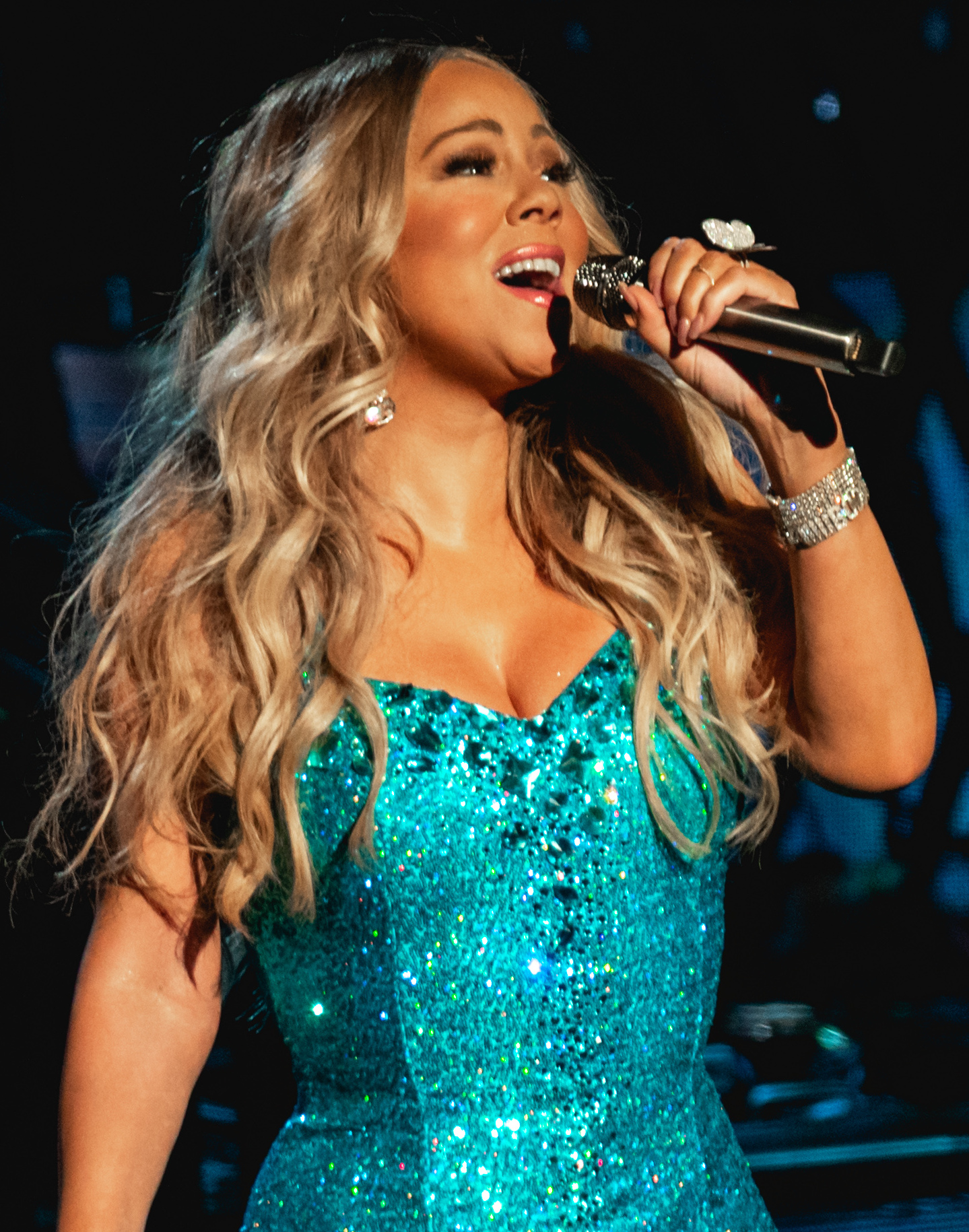
American singer-songwriter Mariah Carey is known as the "Songbird Supreme" and the "Queen of Christmas".

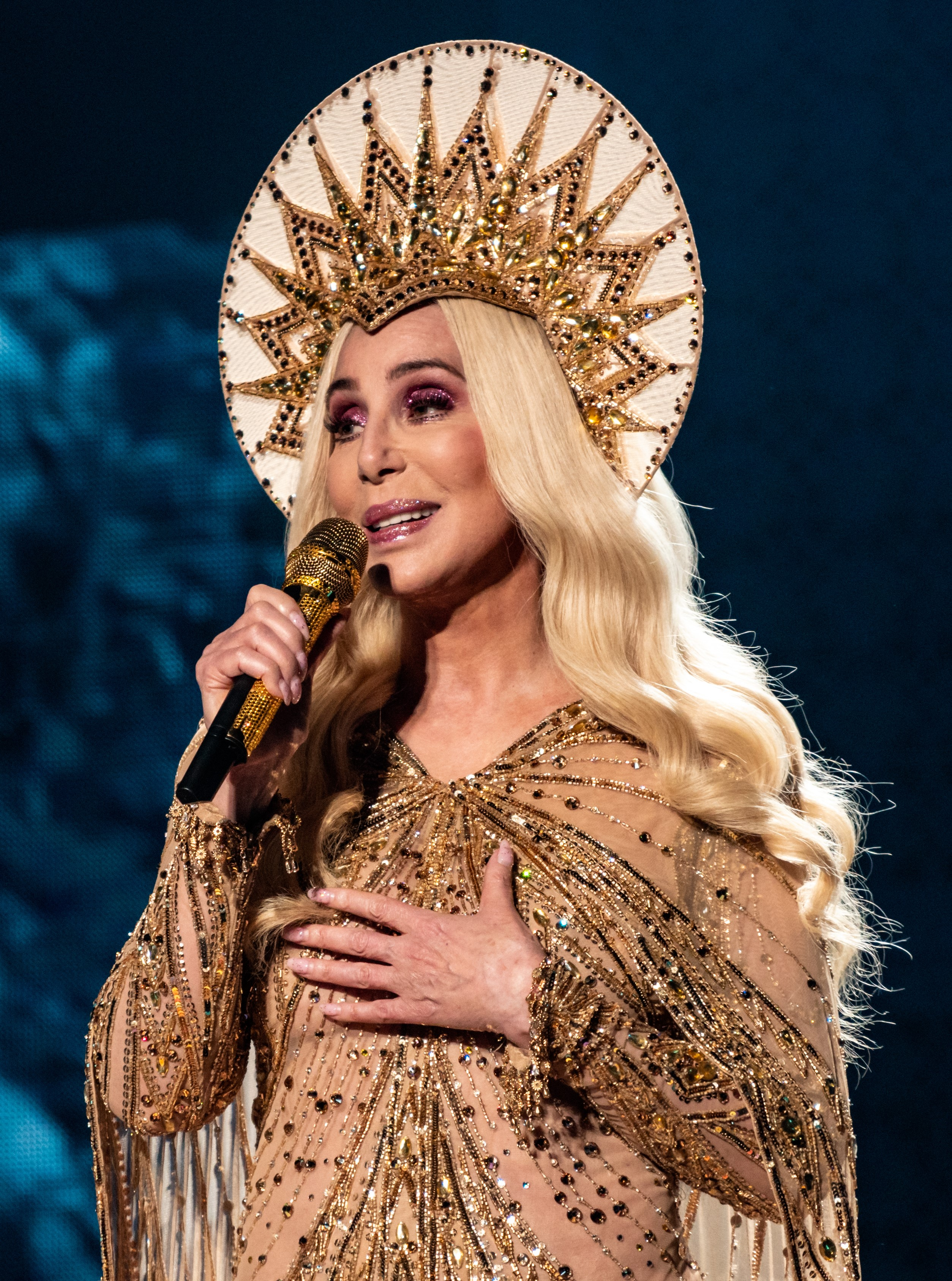
American entertainer Cher is referred to as the "Goddess of Pop".

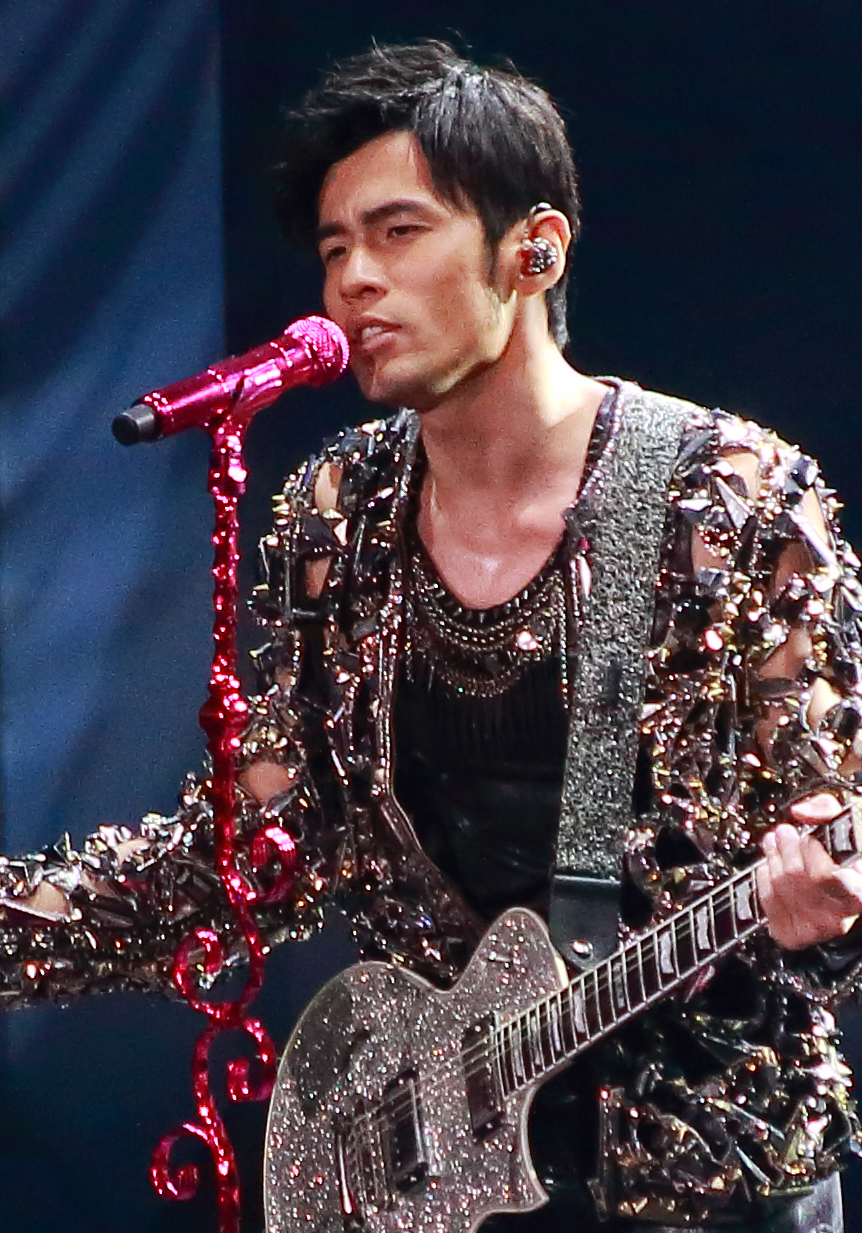
Taiwanese singer-songwriter Jay Chou is known as the "King of Mandopop".

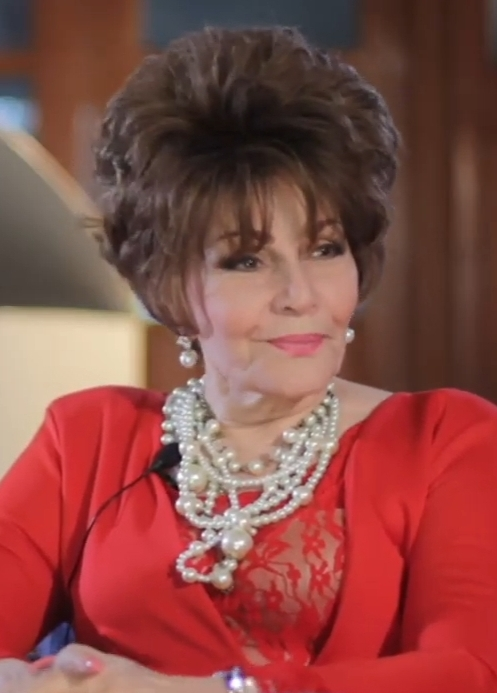
Filipino singer Pilita Corrales is referred to as "Asia's Queen of Songs".

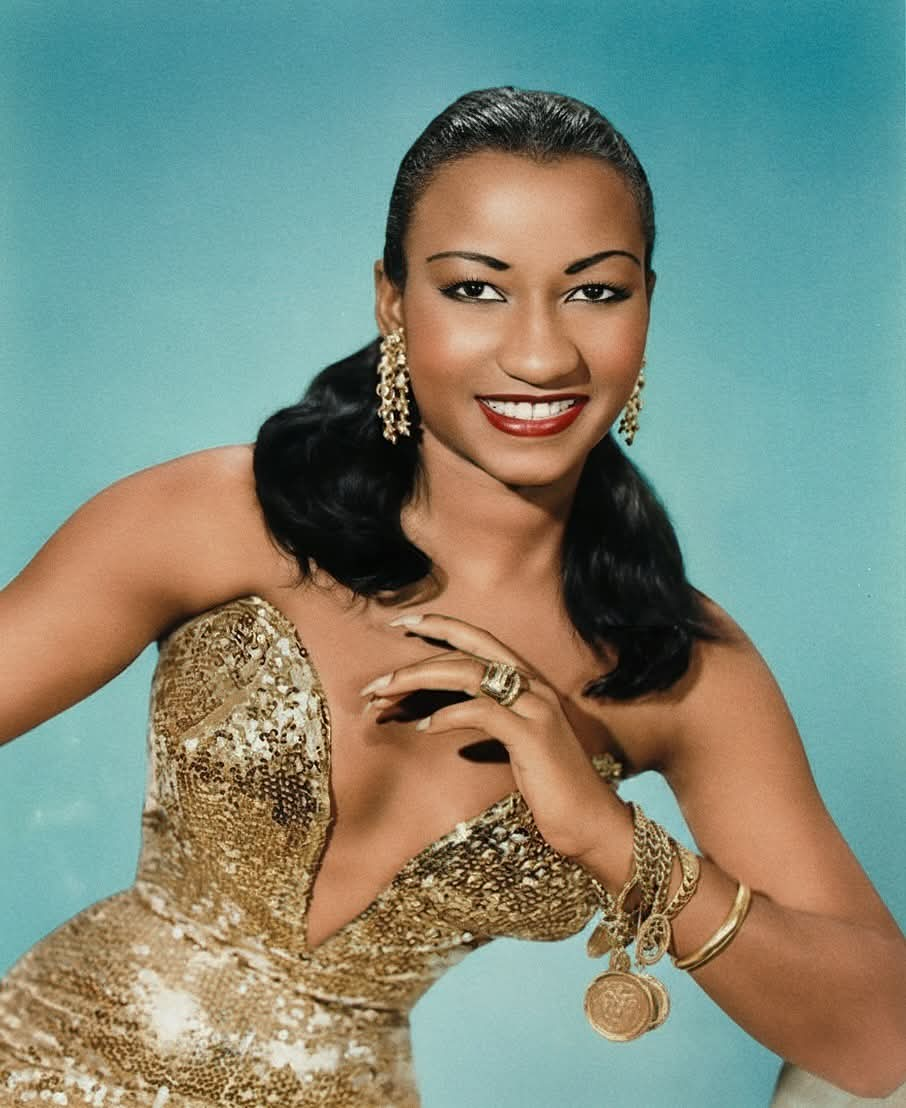
Cuban singer Celia Cruz is known as the "Queen of Salsa".

Artist	Title	Country	Ref.
Montserrat Caballé	La Superba (The Superb One)	Spain	
Maria Callas	La Divina (The Divine One)	Italy/Greece	
Laura Canales	Queen of Tejano	United States	
Mariah Carey	Songbird Supreme	United States	
Mariah Carey	Queen of Christmas	United States	
Ceca	Serbian Mother	Serbia	
Ray Charles	Genius of Soul	United States	
Ray Charles	Father of Soul	United States	
Cher	Goddess of Pop	United States	
Sammi Cheng	Cantopop queen	Hong Kong	
Sammi Cheng	KTV queen / Karaoke queen	Hong Kong	
Clifton Chenier	King of Zydeco	United States	
Jacky Cheung	God of Songs	Hong Kong	
Jay Chou	King of Mandopop	Taiwan	
Kelly Clarkson	Queen of Covers	United States	
George Clinton	Godfather of Funk	United States	
George Clinton	King of Funk	United States	
Keyshia Cole	Princess of Hip Hop Soul	United States	
Alice Cooper	Godfather of Shock Rock	United States	
Pilita Corrales	Asia's Queen of Songs	Philippines	
Celia Cruz	Queen of Salsa	Cuba	
Miley Cyrus	Teen Queen	United States	

=== D ===
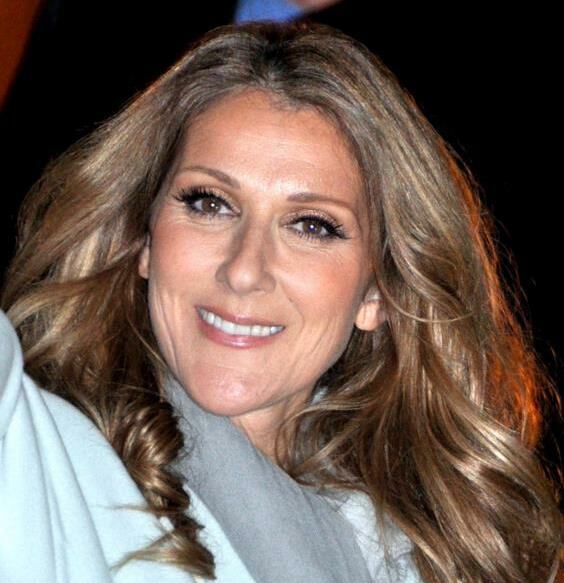
Canadian singer Céline Dion is referred to as the "Queen of Power Ballads" and "Queen of Adult Contemporary".

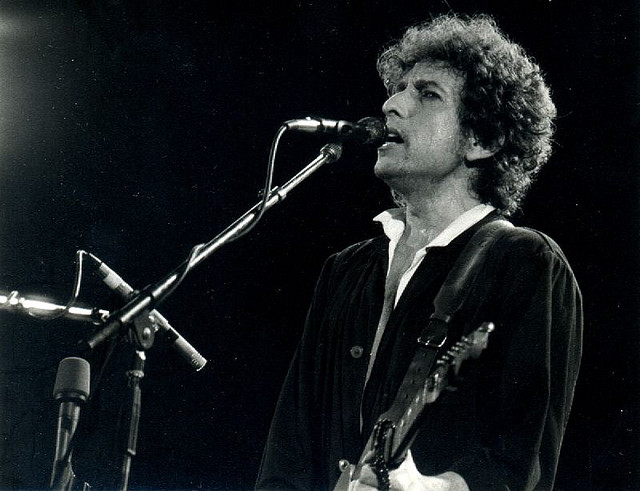
American singer-songwriter Bob Dylan has been called the "Crown Prince of Folk" and "King of Folk".

Artist	Title	Country	Ref.
Mac DeMarco	Prince of Indie Rock/Music	Canada	
Diomedes Díaz	King of Vallenato	Colombia	
Celine Dion	Queen of Power Ballads	Canada	
Celine Dion	Queen of Adult Contemporary	Canada	
DJ Kool Herc	Founder & Father of Hip Hop	Jamaica/United States	
Doja Cat	Queen of Pop-Rap	United States	
Fats Domino	King of Rock and Roll	United States	
Lonnie Donegan	King of Skiffle	United Kingdom	
Morris Dorley	Godfather of Liberian Music	Liberia	
Doro	Metal Queen	Germany	
Thomas A. Dorsey	Father of Gospel Music	United States	
Pumpuang Duangjan	Queen of luk thung	Thailand	
Rocío Dúrcal	Queen of Ranchera	Spain	
Dino Dvornik	King of Funk	Yugoslavia/Croatia	
Bob Dylan	Crown Prince of Folk	United States	
Bob Dylan	King of Folk	United States	

=== E ===
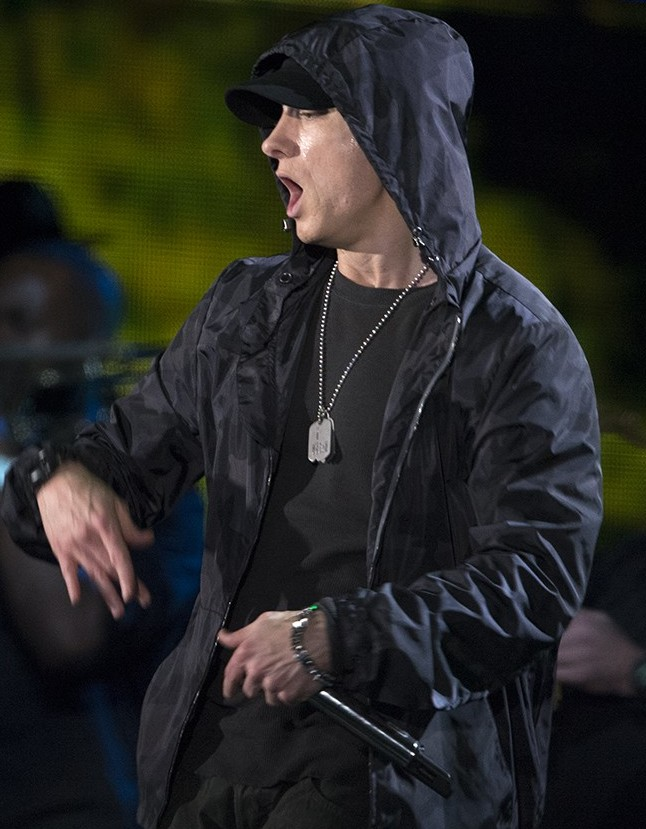
American rapper Eminem has gone by multiple honorifics, such as "King of Hip-Hop" and "King of Rap".

Artist	Title	Country	Ref.
Sheila E.	Queen of Percussion	United States	
Eazy-E	Godfather of Gangsta Rap	United States	
El Alfa	King of Dembow	Dominican Republic	
Missy Elliott	Queen of Hip Hop	United States	
Missy Elliott	Queen of Rap	United States	
Eminem	King of Hip-Hop	United States	
Eminem	King of Rap	United States	
Enya	Queen of New Age	Ireland	
Gloria Estefan	Queen of Latin Pop	Cuba/United States	

=== F ===
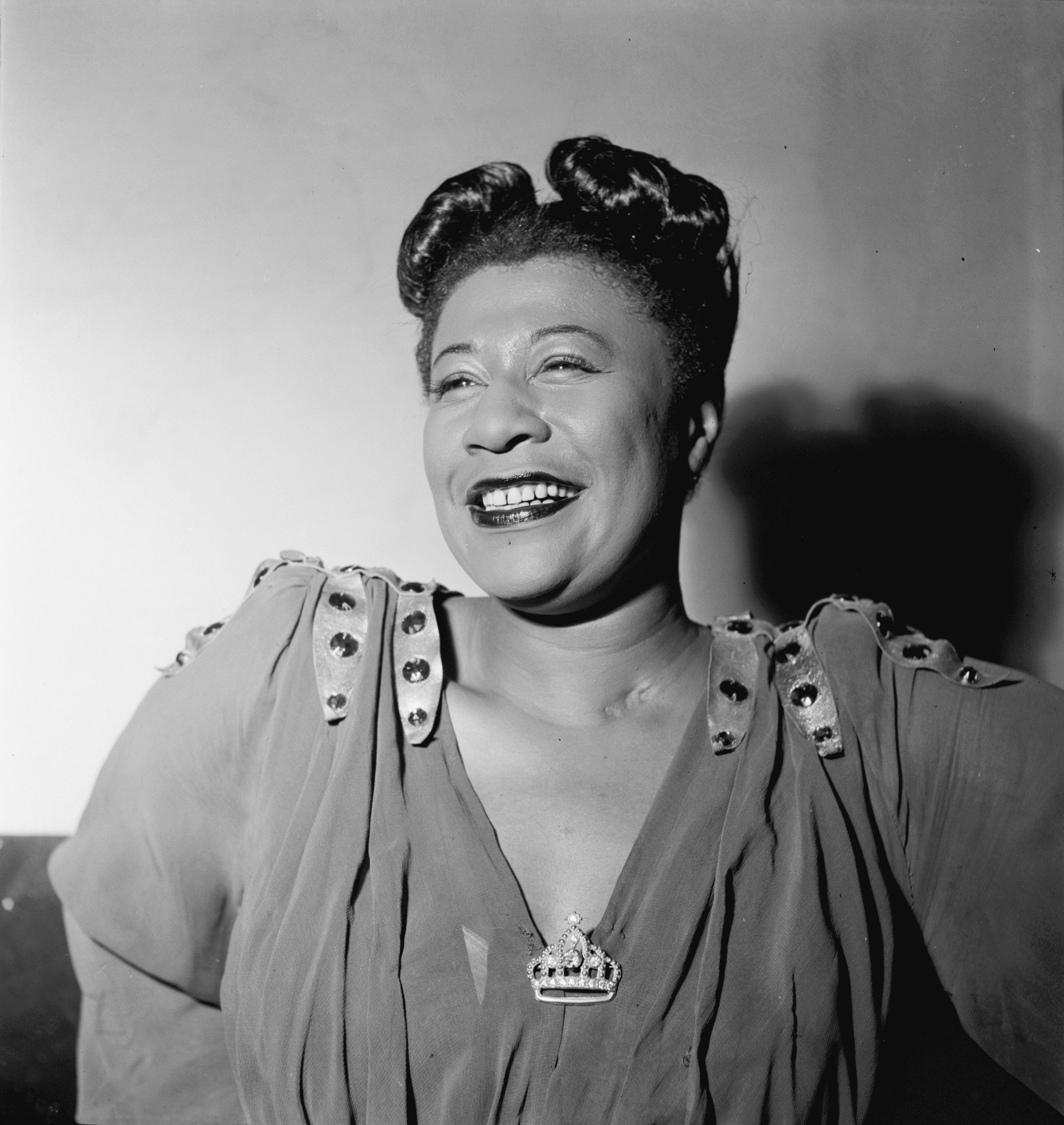
American singer Ella Fitzgerald is known as the "Queen of Jazz" and "First Lady of Song".

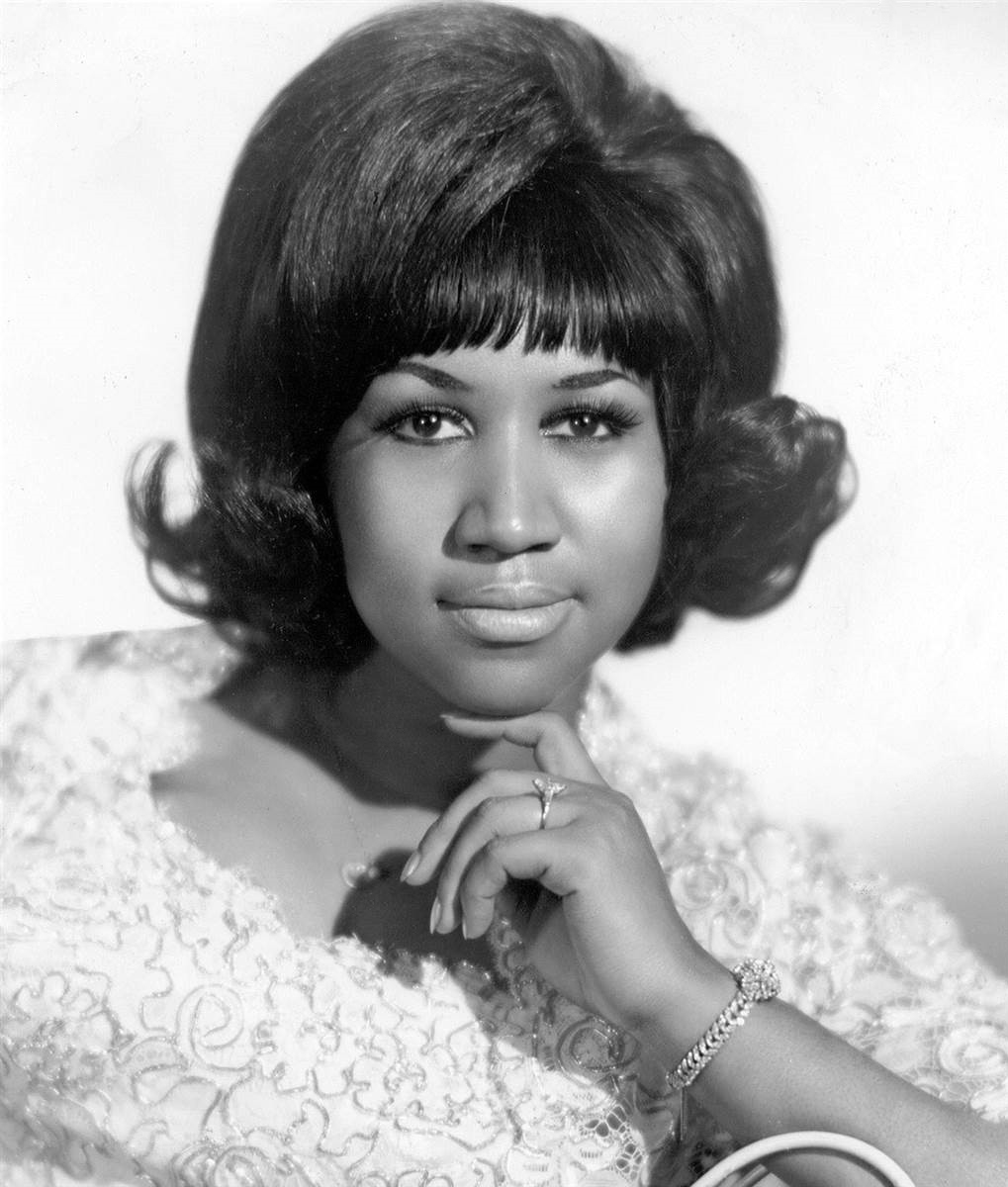
American singer Aretha Franklin is known as the "Queen of Soul".

Artist	Title	Country	Ref.
Helene Fischer	Queen of Schlager (Schlagerkönigin)	Germany	
Ella Fitzgerald	First Lady of Song	United States	
Ella Fitzgerald	Queen of Jazz	United States	
Renata Flores	Queen of Quechua Pop	Peru	
Renata Flores	Queen of Quechua Rap	Peru	
Zucchero Fornaciari	Father of Italian Blues	Italy	
Stephen Foster	Father of American Music	United States	
Aretha Franklin	Queen of Soul	United States	
Alan Freed	King of Rock and Roll	United States	

=== G ===
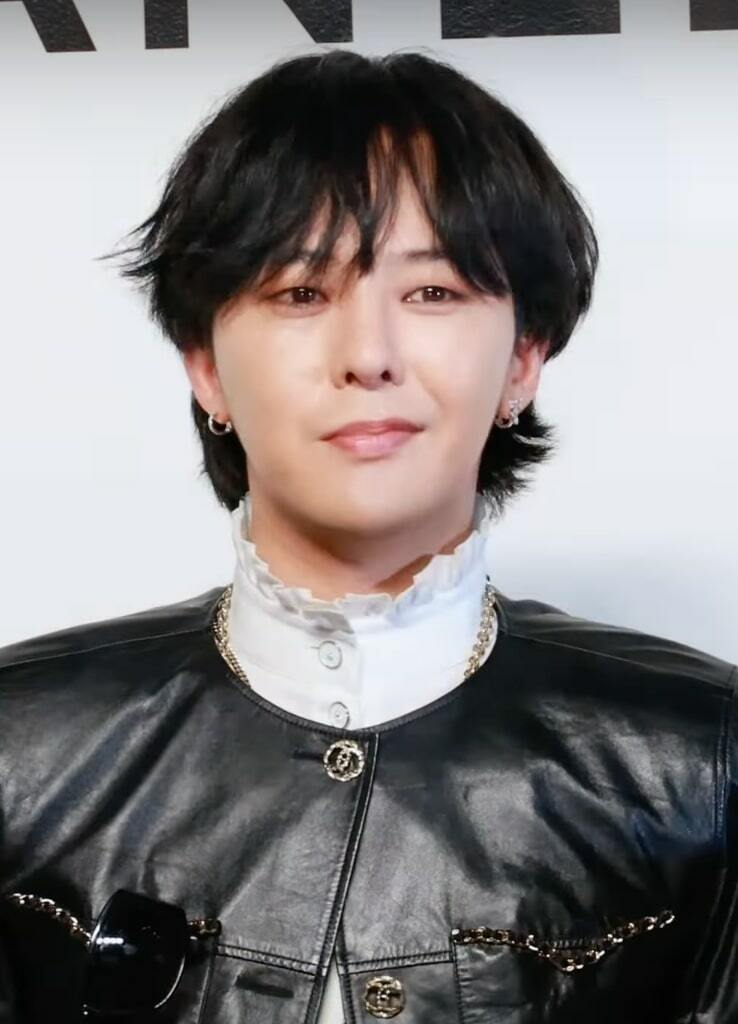
South Korean singer G-Dragon is known as the "King of K-pop".

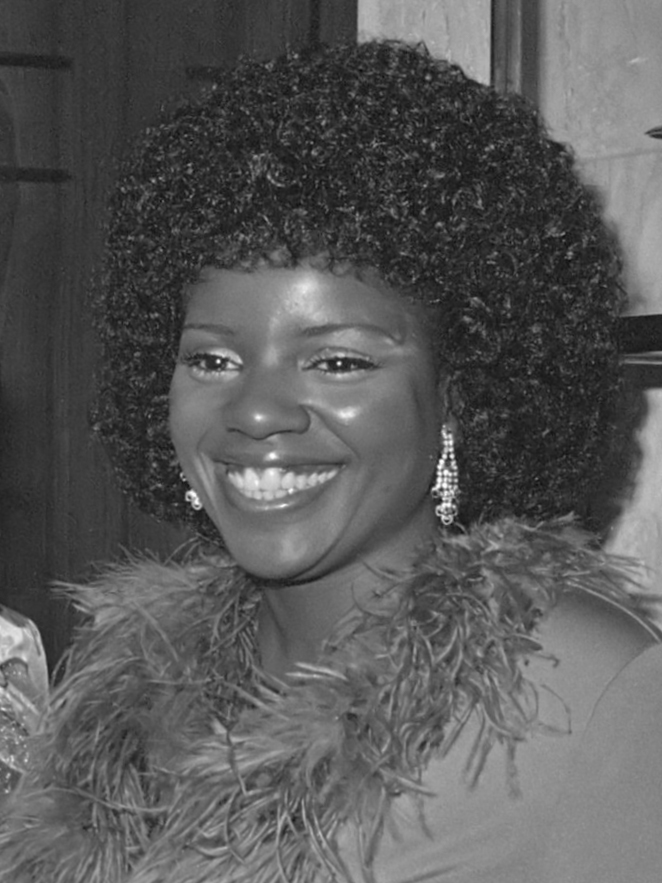
American singer Gloria Gaynor has been referred to as the "Queen of Disco".

Artist	Title	Country	Ref.
Charly García	Godfather of Argentine Rock	Argentina	
Carlos Gardel	King of Tango	Argentina	
Lucho Gatica	King of Bolero	Chile	
Marvin Gaye	Prince of Motown	United States	
Marvin Gaye	Prince of Soul	United States	
Fatu Gayflor	Golden Voice of Liberia	Liberia	
Gloria Gaynor	Queen of Disco	United States	
G-Dragon	King of K-pop	South Korea	
Sarah Geronimo	Popstar Princess	Philippines	
Gesaffelstein	Dark Prince of Techno	France	
Marika Gombitová	Queen of Slovak Pop Music	Slovakia	
Marika Gombitová	Songstress of the 20th Century	Slovakia	
Benny Goodman	King of Swing	United States	
Vestal Goodman	Queen of Gospel Music	United States	
Narayan Gopal	Emperor of Voice	Nepal	
Karel Gott	Golden Voice of Prague	Czech Republic	
Ariana Grande	Pop Princess	United States	
Amy Grant	Queen of Christian Pop	United States	
Olga Guillot	Queen of Bolero	Cuba	
Alejandra Guzmán	Queen of Latin Rock	Mexico	
Astrud Gilberto	Queen of Bossa Nova	Brazil	

=== H ===
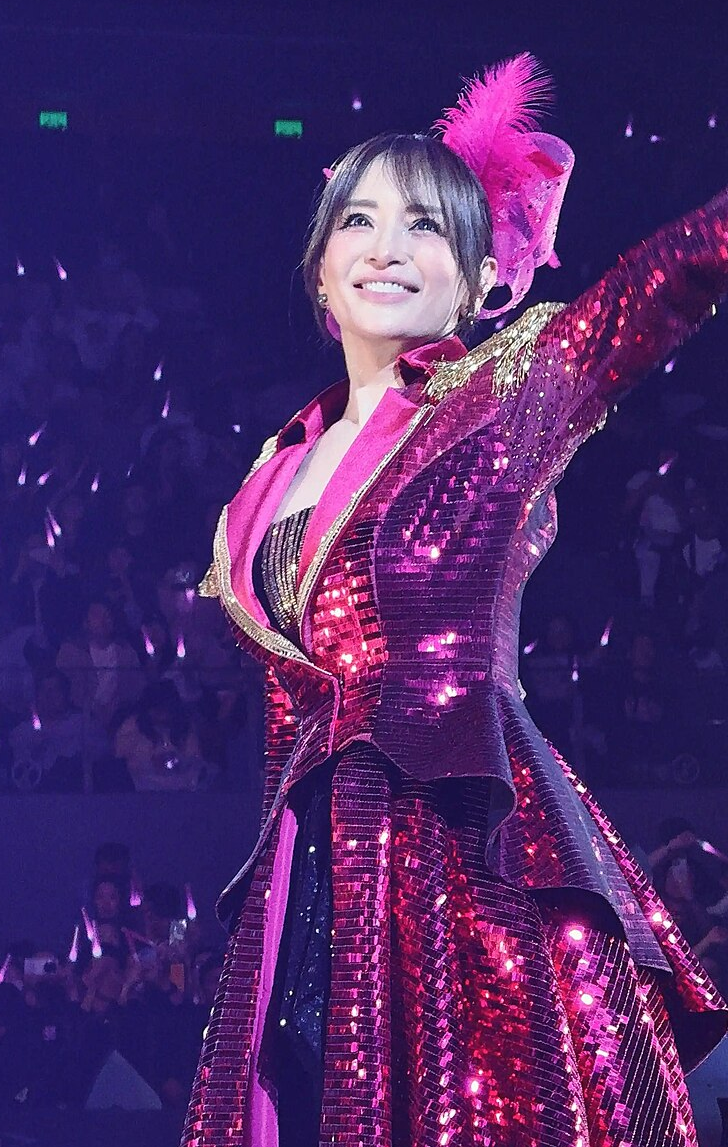
Japanese singer Ayumi Hamasaki is known as the "Empress of J-pop" and the "Queen of J-pop".

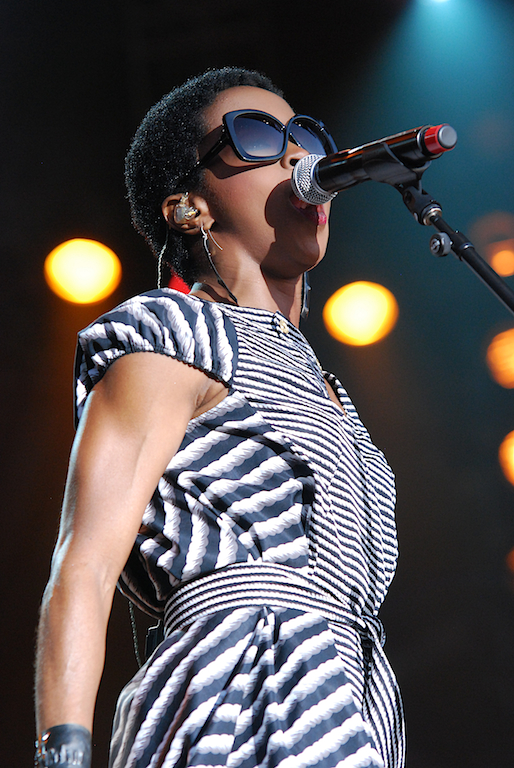
American rapper and singer Lauryn Hill is known as the "Queen of Hip Hop".

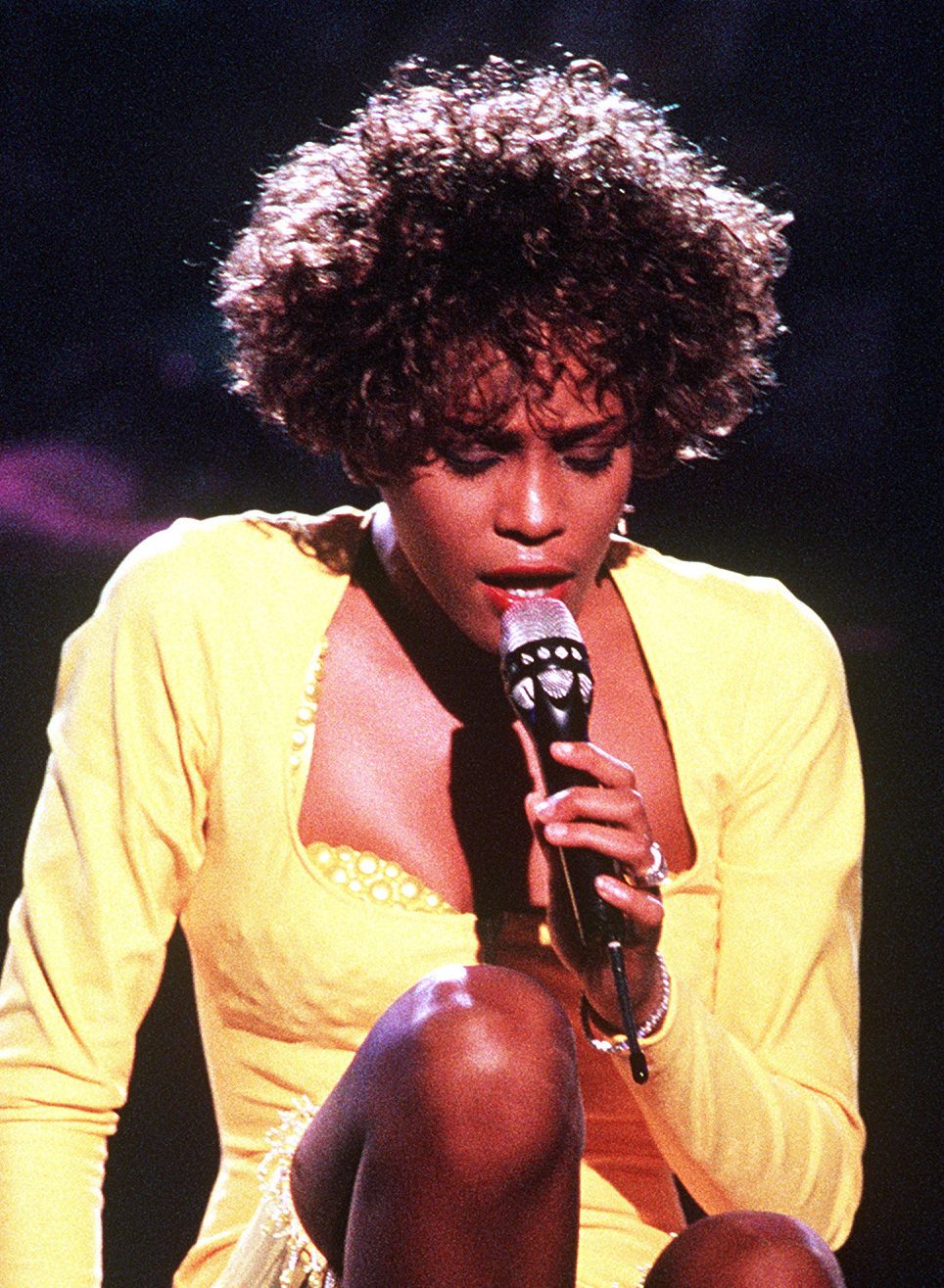
American singer and entertainer Whitney Houston is known as "The Voice".

Artist	Title	Country	Ref.
Nina Hagen	Godmother of Punk	Germany	
Rob Halford	Metal God	United Kingdom	
Mari Hamada	Queen of Heavy Metal	Japan	
Ayumi Hamasaki	Empress of J-pop	Japan	
Ayumi Hamasaki	Queen of J-pop	Japan	
Mehdi Hassan	Emperor of Ghazal	Pakistan	
Nazia Hassan	Queen of South Asian Pop	Pakistan	
Debbie Harry	Queen of New Wave	United States	
Ofra Haza	Madonna of the Middle East	Israel	
Hana Hegerová	Queen of Czechoslovak Chanson	Czech Republic/Slovakia	
Kiyoshi Hikawa	Prince of the Enka World	Japan	
Lauryn Hill	Queen of Hip Hop	United States	
Mitsuko Horie	Queen of the Anison World	Japan	
Whitney Houston	The Voice	United States	
Sam Hui	God of Song	Hong Kong	
Engelbert Humperdinck	King of Romance	United Kingdom	
Steve Hunter	The Deacon	United States	
Al Hurricane	Godfather of New Mexico Music	United States	

=== I ===
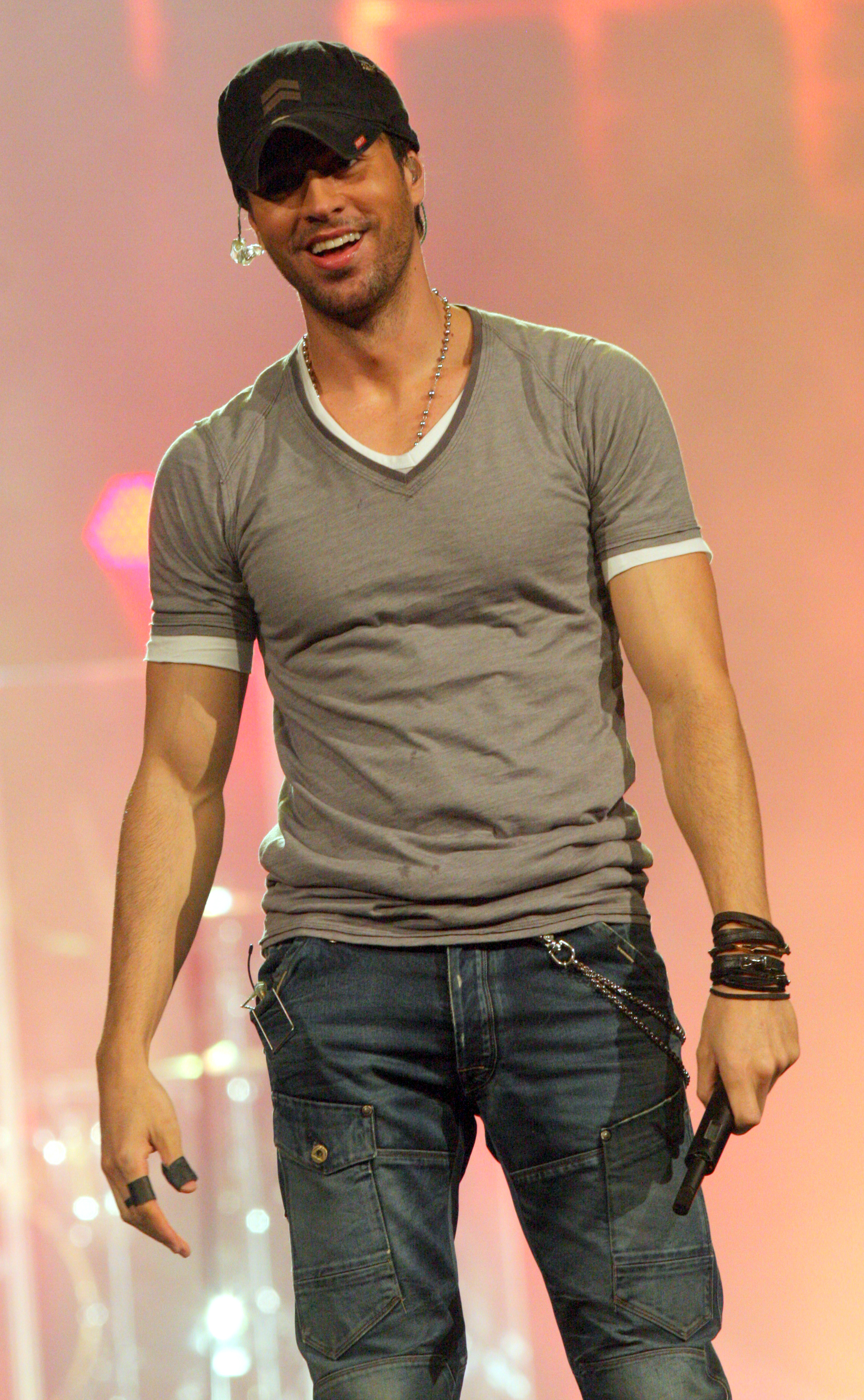
Spanish singer Enrique Iglesias is known as the "King of Latin Pop".

Artist	Title	Country	Ref.
Enrique Iglesias	King of Latin Pop	Spain	
La India	The Princess of Salsa	Puerto Rico (US)	
Rhoma Irama	King of Dangdut	Indonesia	
IU	Nation's Little Sister	South Korea	
Lili Ivanova	Prima of Bulgarian Popular Music	Bulgaria	
Ivy Queen	Queen of Reggaetón	United States	

=== J ===
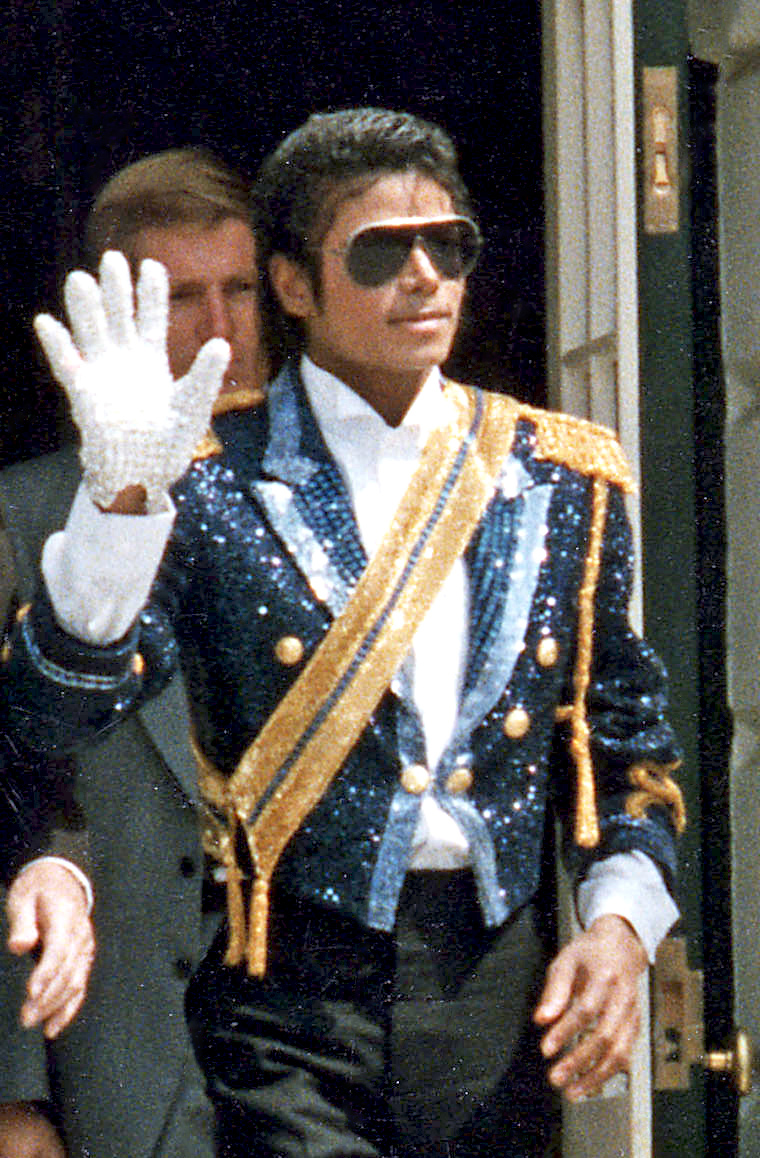
American singer and entertainer Michael Jackson is known as the "King of Pop".

Artist	Title	Country	Ref.
Janet Jackson	Queen of Pop	United States	
Mahalia Jackson	Queen of Gospel	United States	
Michael Jackson	King of Pop	United States	
Wanda Jackson	Queen of Rockabilly	United States	
James	Guru (Master)	Bangladesh	
James	Nagar Baul (Urban Baul)	Bangladesh	
Julio Jaramillo	Nightingale of America	Ecuador	
Jay R	Philippines' King of R&B	Philippines	
Jay-Z	King of Rap	United States	
Jaya	Philippine Queen of Soul	Philippines	
Noor Jehan	Queen of Melody	Pakistan	
Cui Jian	Godfather of Chinese Rock	China	
Joan Jett	Godmother of Punk	United States	
Robert Johnson	Grandfather of Rock and Roll	United States	
Sharon Jones	Godmother of Soul	United States	
Janis Joplin	Queen of Rock and Roll	United States	
Scott Joplin	King of Ragtime	United States	
Louis Jordan	King of the Jukebox	United States	
José José	The Prince of Song	Mexico	

=== K ===
Artist	Title	Country	Ref.
Hironobu Kageyama	Prince of the Anison World	Japan	
Shizuko Kasagi	Queen of Boogie	Japan	
R. Kelly	King of R&B	United States	
R. Kelly	King of Pop-Soul	United States	
Alicia Keys	Queen of R&B	United States	
Khaled	King of Raï	Algeria	
Chaka Khan	Queen of Funk	United States	
Nusrat Fateh Ali Khan	Emperor of Qawwali	Pakistan	
B.B. King	King of the Blues	United States	
Gladys Knight	Empress of Soul	United States	
Frankie Knuckles	Godfather of House	United States	
Joseph Koo	Godfather of Cantopop	Hong Kong	
Alexis Korner	Father of British Blues	United Kingdom	
Fubuki Koshiji	Queen of Chanson	Japan	
Koda Kumi	Queen of J-pop	Japan	
Fela Kuti	King of Afrobeat	Nigeria	
Kygo	King of Tropical House	Norway	
Kyla	Philippine Queen of R&B	Philippines	

=== L ===
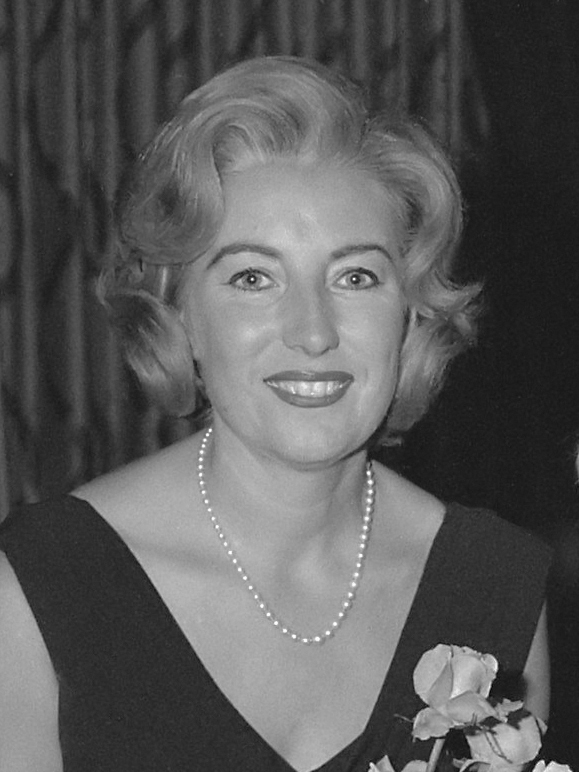
English singer Vera Lynn was known as the "Forces' Sweetheart" for her popularity among the armed forces during World War II.

Artist	Title	Country	Ref.
Patti LaBelle	Godmother of Soul	United States	
Lady Gaga	Queen of Pop	United States	
La Lupe	Queen of Latin Soul	Cuba	
Kendrick Lamar	King Kendrick	United States	
Franzl Lang	Yodel King or Yodler King (der Jodlerkönig)	Germany	
Cyndi Lauper	Queen of Quirky Pop	United States	
Avril Lavigne	Queen of Pop Punk	Canada	
Rita Lee	Queen of Brazilian Rock	Brazil	
Rita Lee	Queen of Pop	Brazil	
Lil Jon	King of Crunk	United States	
Lil' Kim	Queen of Rap	United States	
Little Richard	Architect of Rock and Roll	United States	
Kenny Loggins	King of the Movie Soundtrack	United States	
Jennifer Lopez	Queen of Dance	United States	
Lorde	Queen of Alternative	New Zealand	
Lucero	America's Girlfriend (La Novia de América)	Mexico	
Vera Lynn	Forces' Sweetheart	United Kingdom	

=== M ===
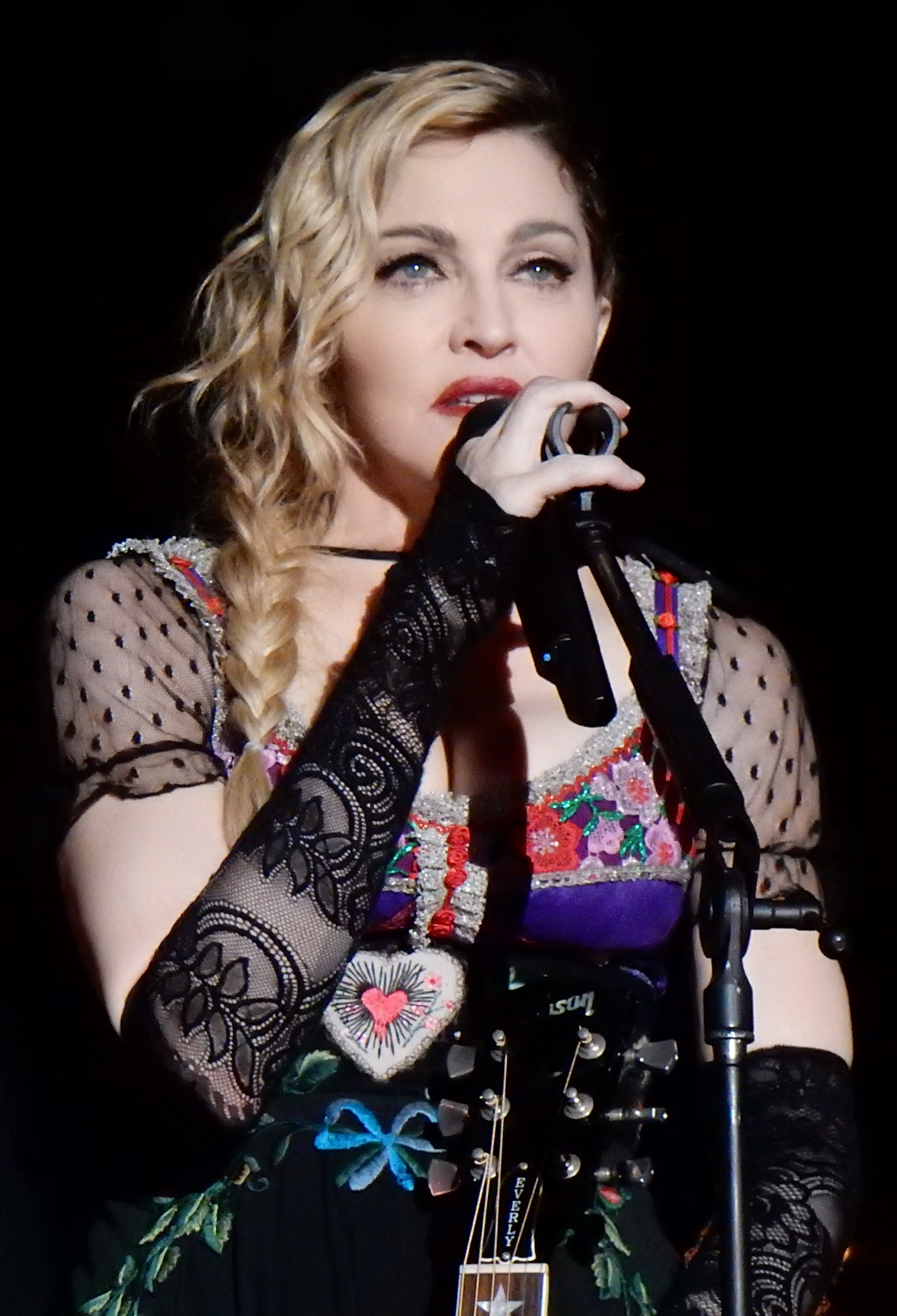
American singer-songwriter Madonna is known as the "Queen of Pop".

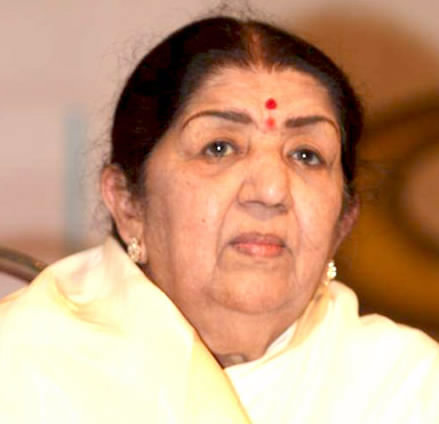
Indian singer Lata Mangeshkar is widely acknowledged as the "Queen of Melody".

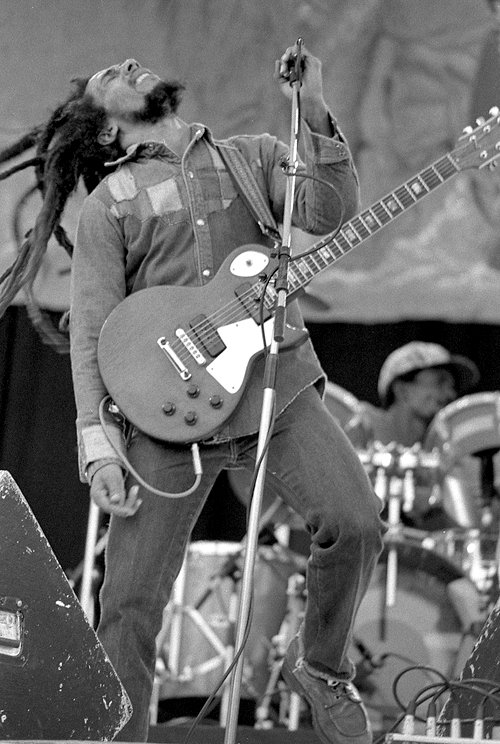
Jamaican musician Bob Marley is known as the "King of Reggae".

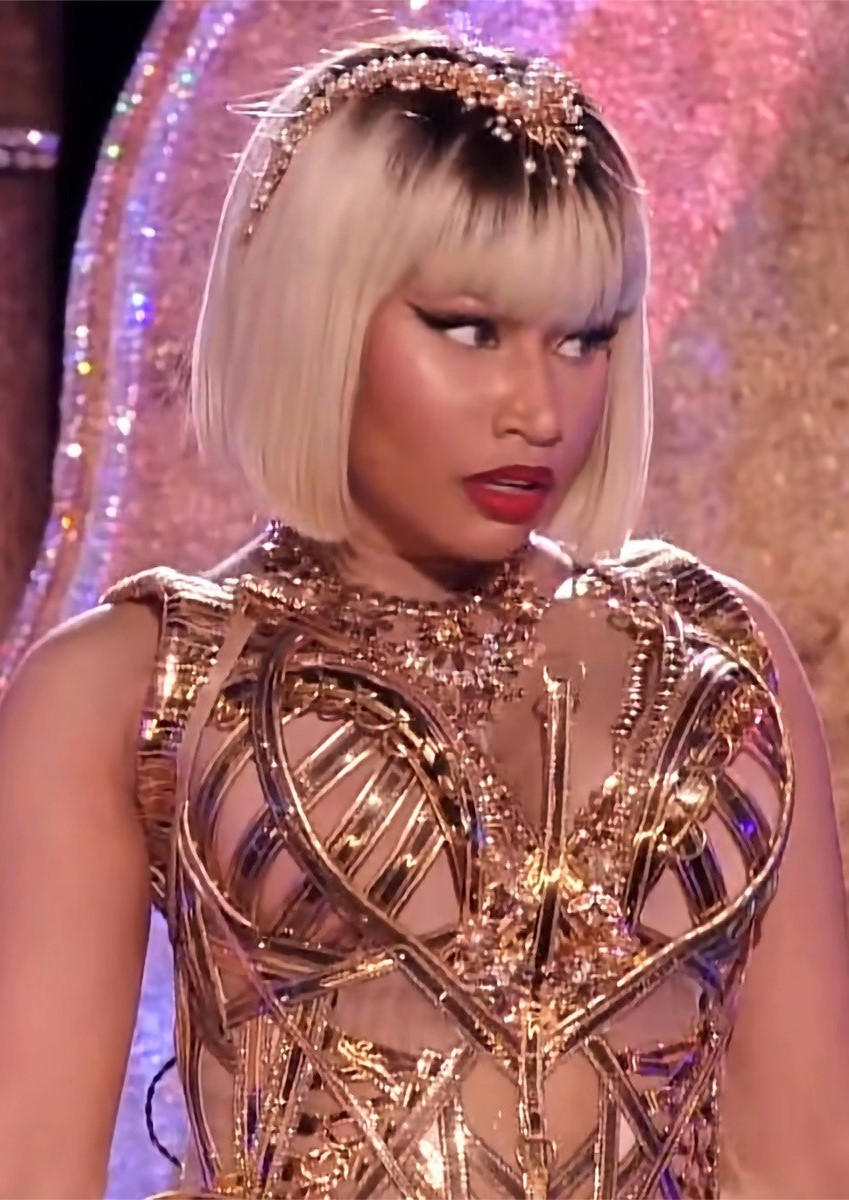
Trinidadian rapper and singer Nicki Minaj is known as the "Queen of Rap".

Artist	Title	Country	Ref.
Madonna	Queen of Pop	United States	
Jolina Magdangal	Queen of Philippine Pop Culture	Philippines	
Miriam Makeba	Mama Africa	South Africa	
Biz Markie	Clown Prince of Hip Hop	United States	
Bob Marley	King of Reggae	Jamaica	
Bruno Mars	Prince of Pop	United States	
Ricky Martin	King of Latin Pop	Puerto Rico (US)	
John Mayall	Godfather of British Blues	United Kingdom	
Freddie Mercury	The King of Queen	United Kingdom	
Mighty Sparrow	Calypso King of the World	Trinidad and Tobago	
Luis Miguel	El Sol de Mexico (The Sun of Mexico)	Mexico	
Slađana Milošević	Rock Princess	Yugoslavia/Serbia	
Nicki Minaj	Queen of Rap	Trinidad and Tobago/United States	
Nicki Minaj	Queen of Hip Hop	Trinidad and Tobago/United States	
Kylie Minogue	Princess of Pop	Australia	
Kylie Minogue	Queen of Pop	Australia	
Ichirō Mizuki	Emperor of Anime Songs	Japan	
Bill Monroe	Father of Bluegrass	United States	
Andy Montañez	The Godfather of the Salsa	Puerto Rico (US)	
Rudy Ray Moore	Godfather of Rap	United States	
Giorgio Moroder	Father of Disco	Italy	
Alanis Morissette	Queen of Alt-Rock Angst	Canada	
Anita Mui	Queen of Cantopop	Hong Kong	
Peter Murphy	Godfather of Goth	United Kingdom	
Dean Martin	King of Cool	United States	

=== N ===
Artist	Title	Country	Ref.
Nalepa Tadeusz	Father of Polish Blues	Poland	
Nate Dogg	King of Hooks	United States	
Emilio Navaira	King of Tejano	United States	
Grant Nelson	The Godfather of UK garage	United Kingdom	
Stevie Nicks	Queen of Rock and Roll	United States	
Nike Ardilla	Lady Rocker	Indonesia	
Maki Nomiya	Queen of Shibuya-kei	Japan	
The Notorious B.I.G.	The King of New York	United States	
Nujabes	The Godfather of Lo-fi hip hop	Japan	

=== O ===
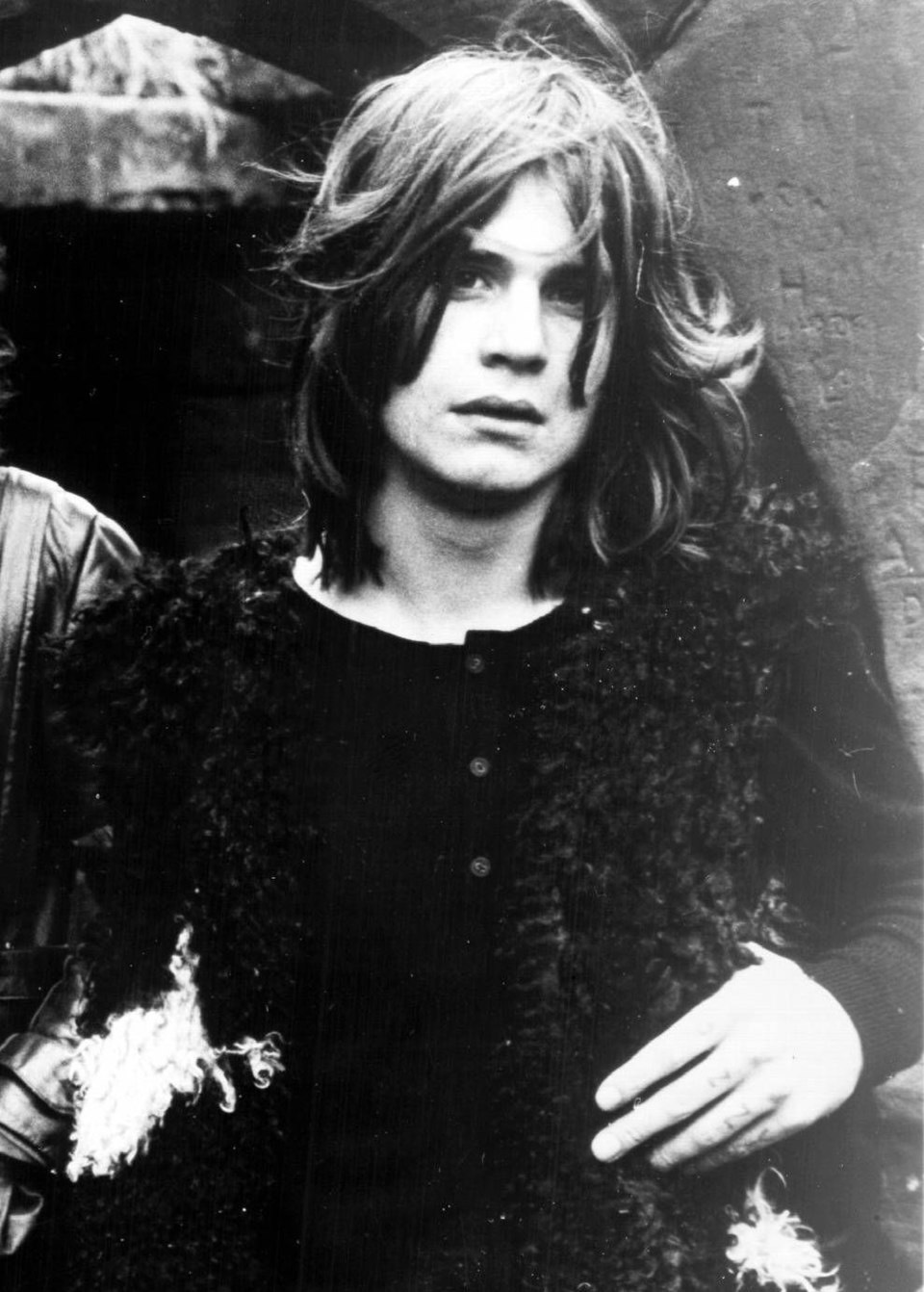
English singer Ozzy Osbourne has been identified as the "Godfather of Heavy Metal" and the "Prince of Darkness".

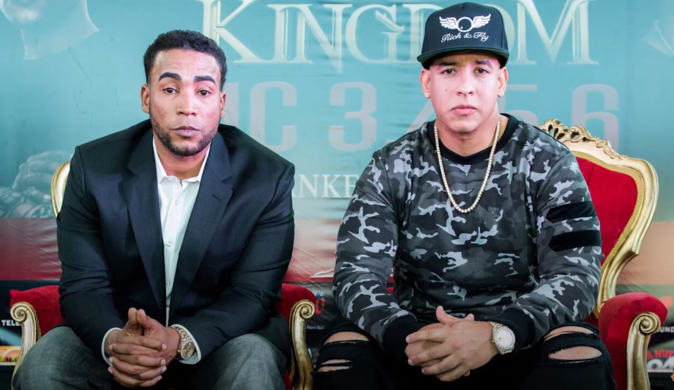
Puerto Rican singers Don Omar (left) and Daddy Yankee (right) are both referred to as the "King of Reggaeton".

Artist	Title	Country	Ref.
Odetta	Queen of American Folk Music	United States	
Nobuyasu Okabayashi	God of Folk	Japan	
Don Omar	King of Reggaeton	Puerto Rico (US)	
Ozzy Osbourne	Godfather of Heavy Metal	United Kingdom	
Ozzy Osbourne	Prince of Darkness	United Kingdom	
Johnny Otis	Godfather of Rhythm and Blues	United States	
Ozuna	New King of Reggaeton	Puerto Rico (US)	

=== P ===
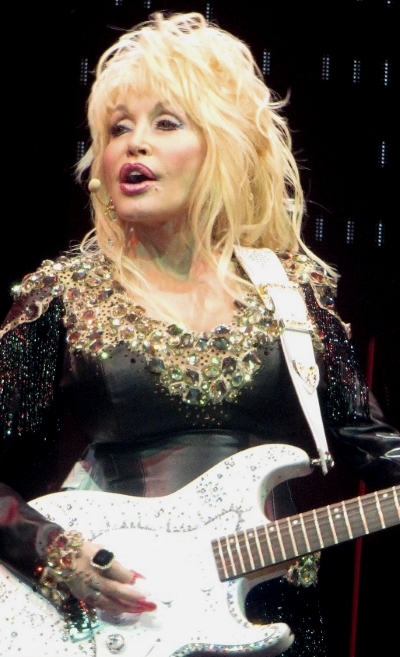
American singer Dolly Parton is widely acknowledged as the "Queen of Country".

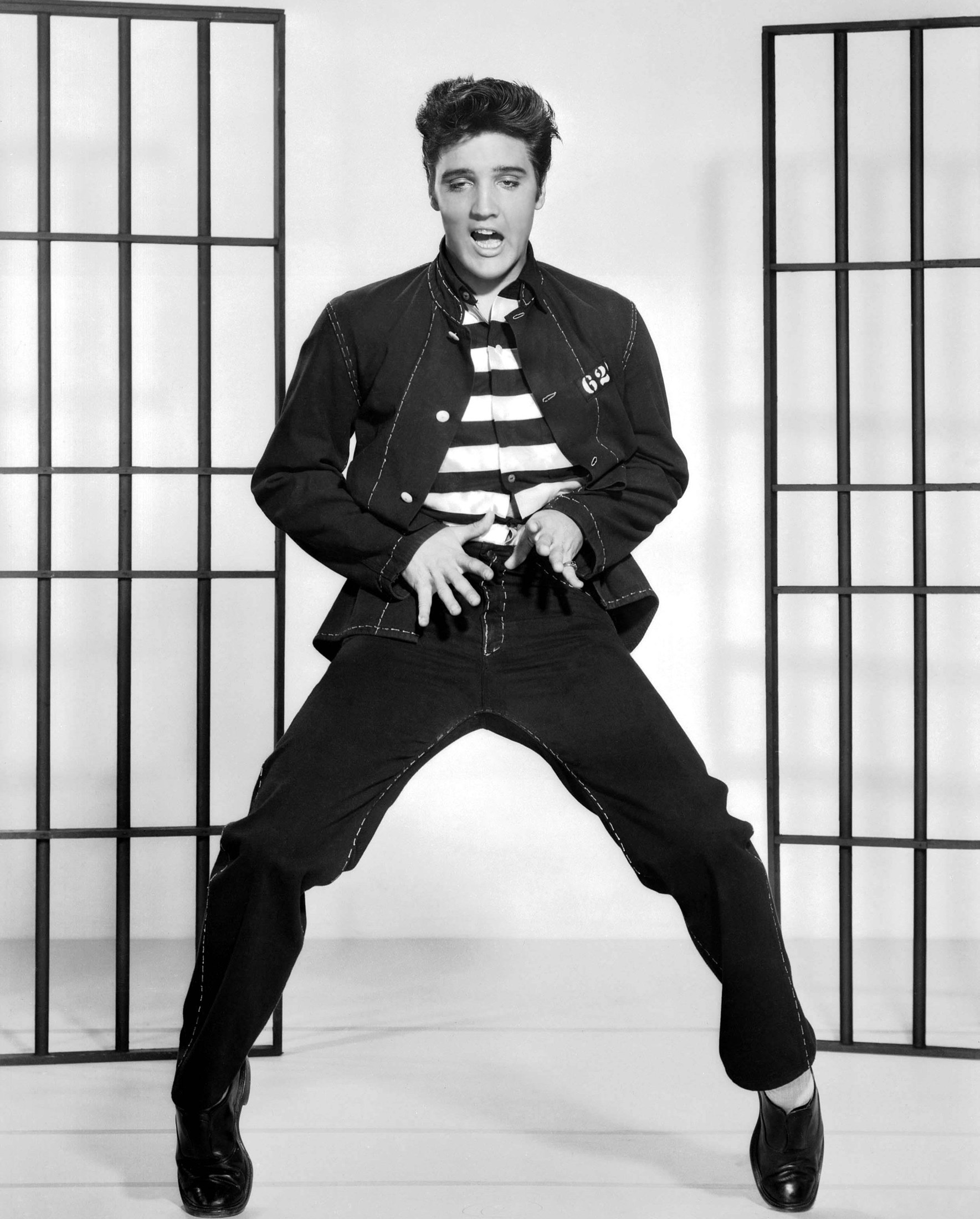
American singer Elvis Presley is known as the "King of Rock and Roll".

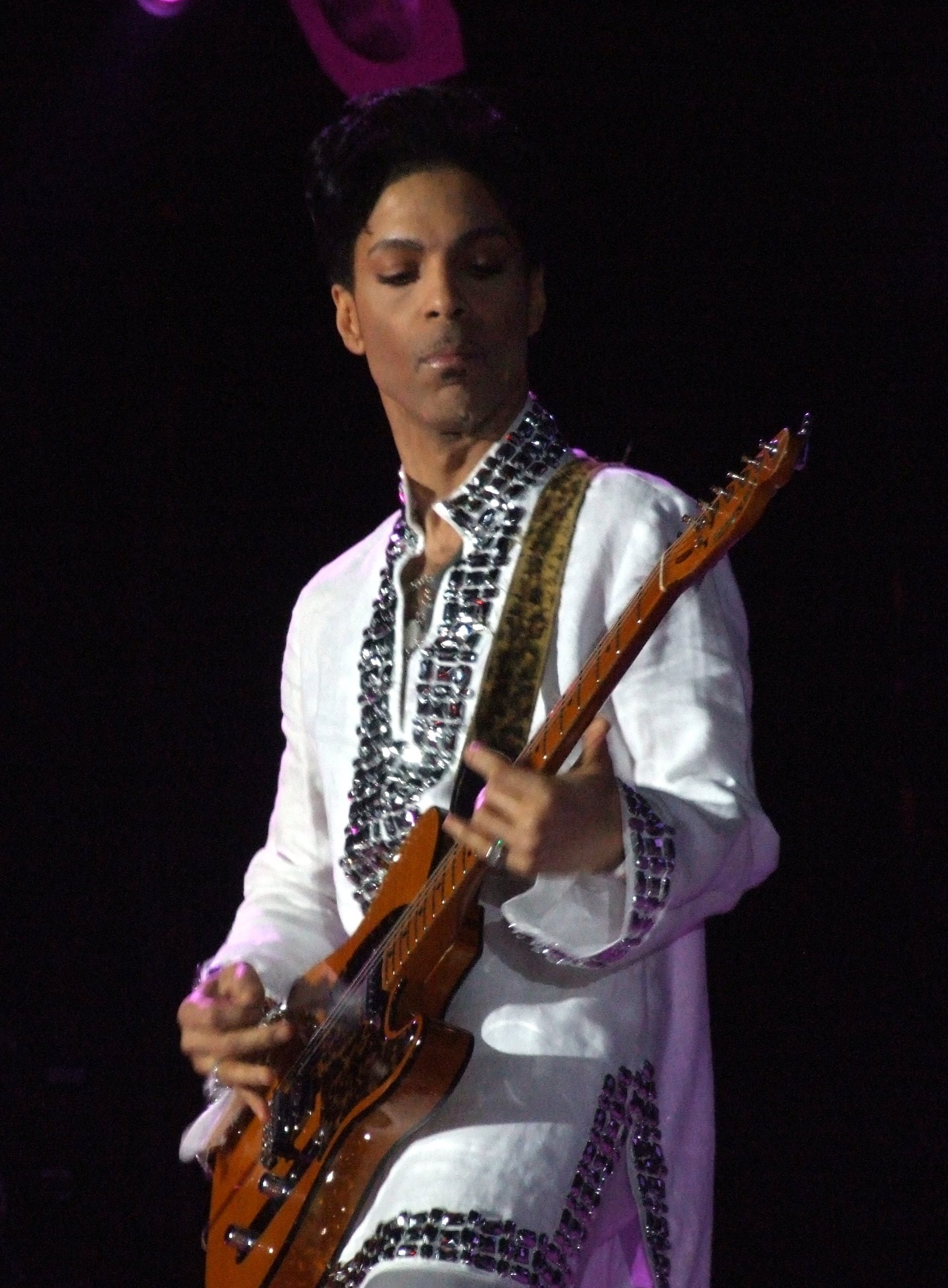
American musician Prince has been referred to as "The Artist", "The Purple One" and "His Royal Badness".

Artist	Title	Country	Ref.
Kyary Pamyu Pamyu	Princess of J-pop	Japan	
Dolly Parton	Queen of Country	United States	
Abida Parveen	Queen of Sufi Music	Pakistan	
Charley Patton	Father of the Delta Blues	United States	
Peret	King of Catalan Rumba	Spain	
Katy Perry	Queen of Camp	United States	
Iggy Pop	Godfather of Punk	United States	
Elvis Presley	King of Rock and Roll	United States	
Elvis Presley	The King	United States	
Lisa Marie Presley	Princess of Rock and Roll	United States	
Prince	The Artist	United States	
Alla Pugacheva	Queen of Russian Pop	Russia	

=== Q ===
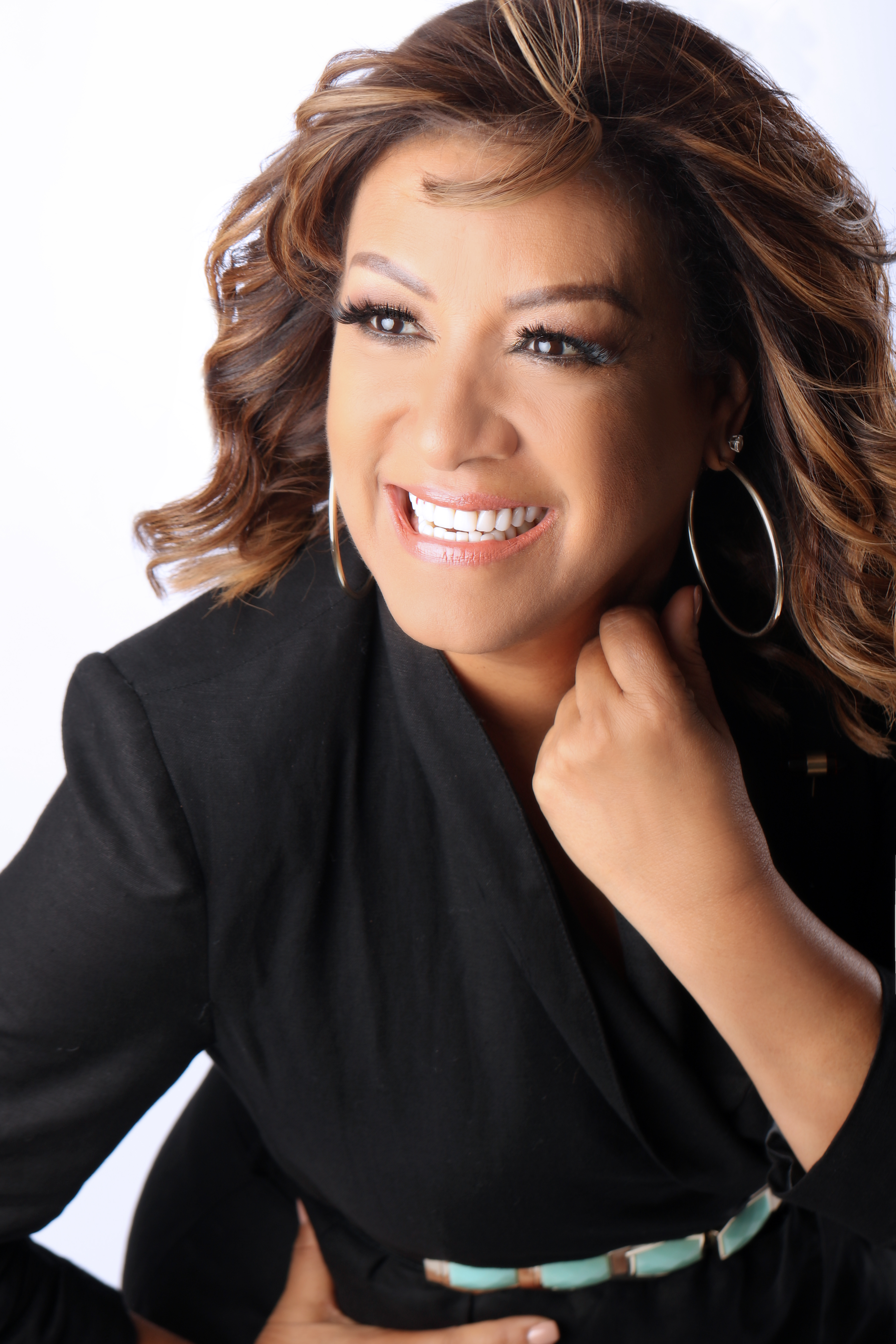
Dominican singer Milly Quezada is known as the "Queen of Merengue".

Artist	Title	Country	Ref.
Queen Latifah	Queen of Rap, Hip Hop	United States	
Milly Quezada	Queen of Merengue	Dominican Republic	
A.B. Quintanilla	King of Cumbia	United States	

=== R ===
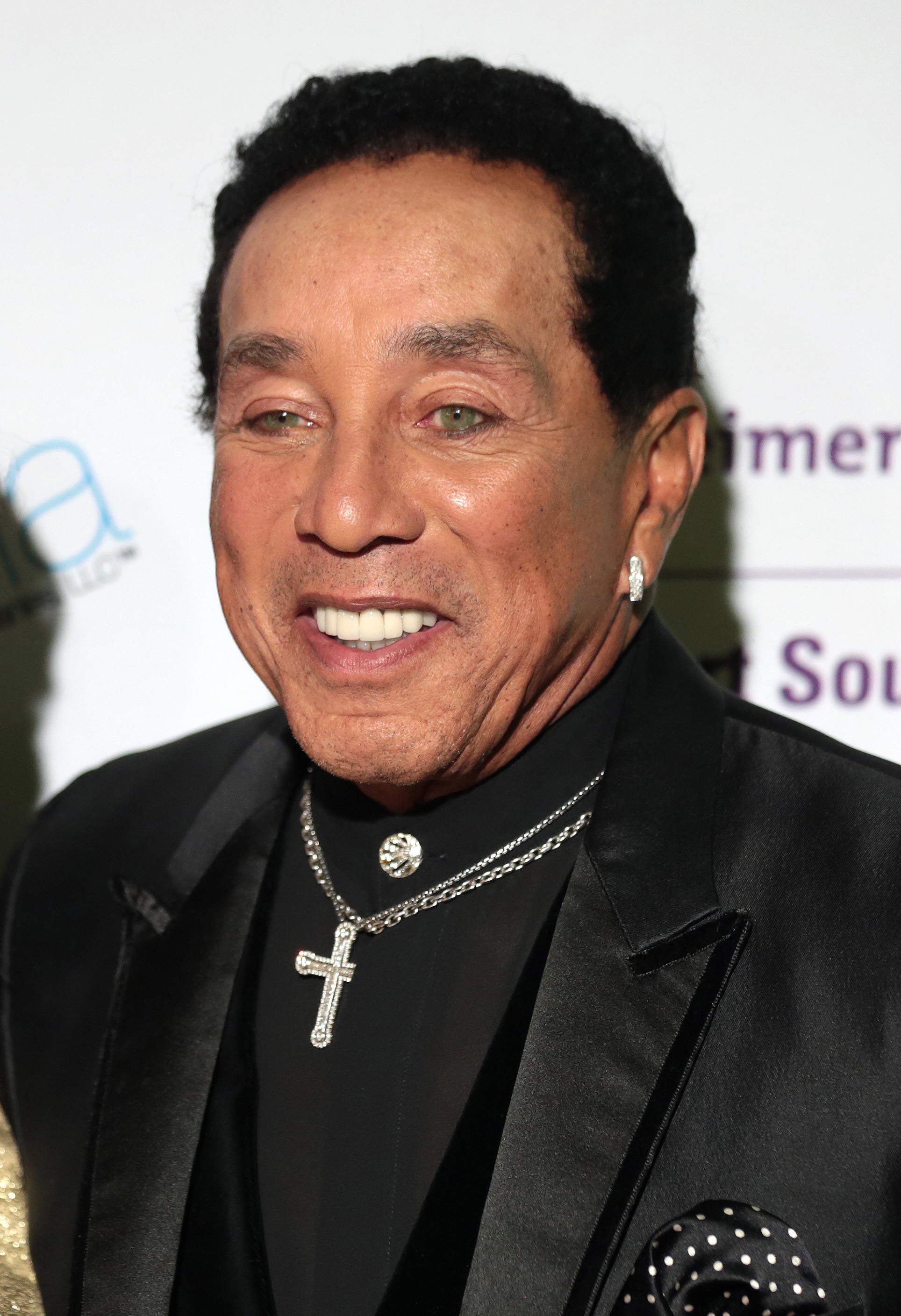
American singer Smokey Robinson has been called the "King of Motown".

Artist	Title	Country	Ref.
Ma Rainey	Mother of the Blues	United States	
Joey Ramone	Godfather of Punk	United States	
Otis Redding	King of Soul	United States	
Esma Redžepova	Queen of Gypsy Music	North Macedonia	
Lou Reed	Godfather of Punk	United States	
Frank Reyes	Prince of Bachata	Dominican Republic	
Rihanna	R&B Princess	Barbados	
Teddy Riley	King of New Jack Swing	United States	
Jenni Rivera	Diva de la Banda (Diva of Banda)	United States	
Chappell Roan	Midwest Princess	United States	
Ross Robinson	Godfather of Nu Metal	United States	
Smokey Robinson	King of Motown	United States	
Sylvia Robinson	Mother of Hip-Hop	United States	
Jimmie Rodgers	Father of Country Music	United States	
Amália Rodrigues	Queen of Fado	Portugal	
Rossa	Queen of Pop Indonesia	Indonesia	
Ahmed Rushdi	Magician of Voice	Pakistan	
Paulina Rubio	The Golden Girl	Mexico	
Paulina Rubio	Queen of Latin Pop	Mexico	
RuPaul	Queen of Drag	United States	

=== S ===
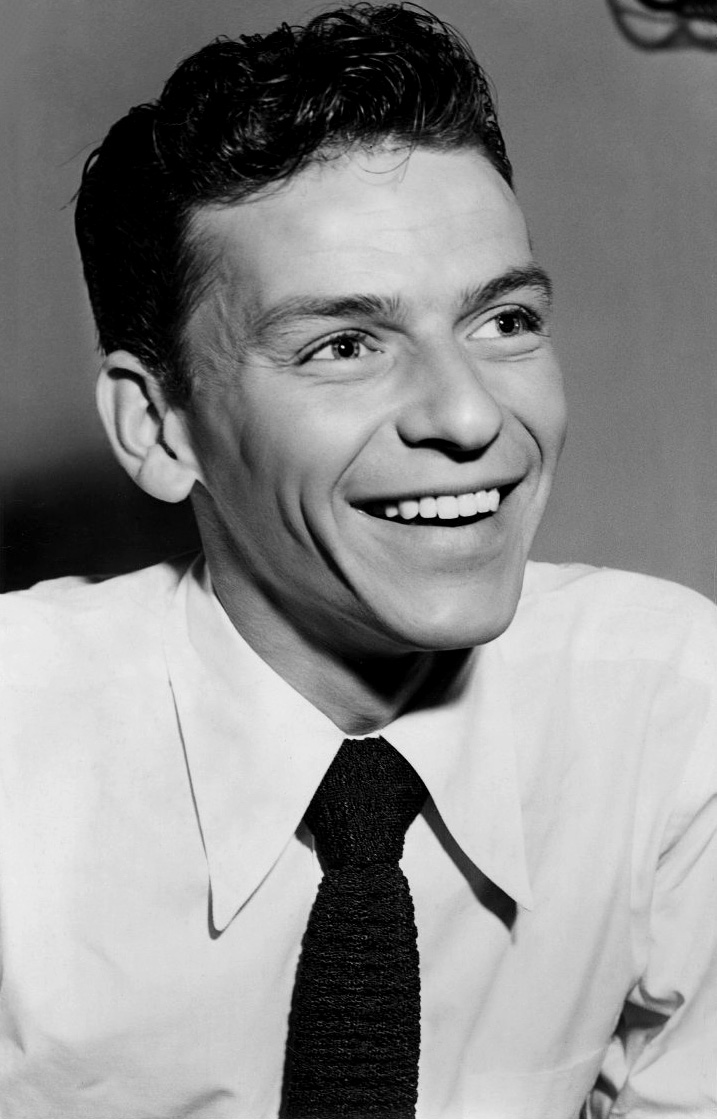
American singer, conductor, and actor Frank Sinatra was known as the "Chairman of the Board" and "The Voice".

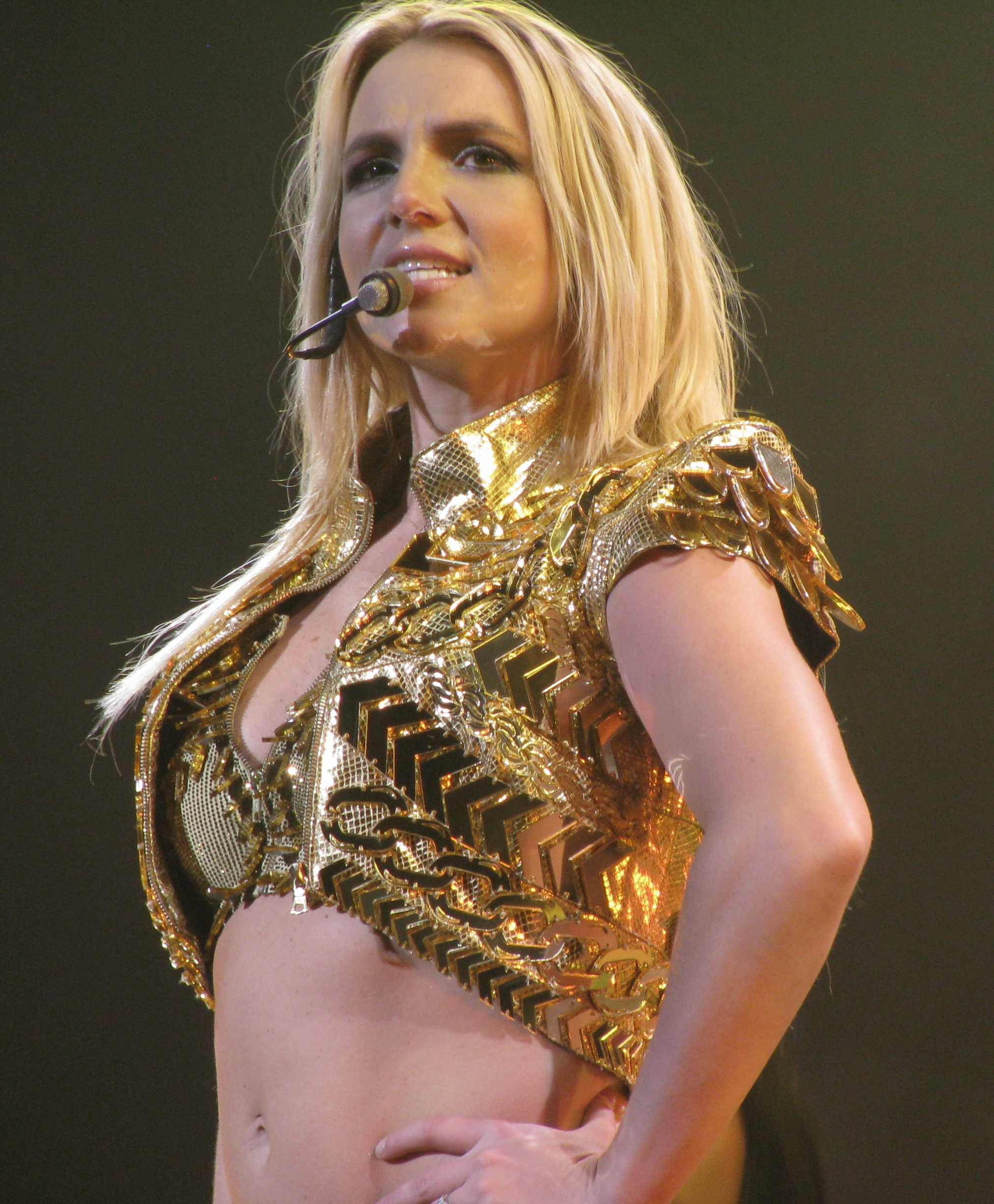
American singer Britney Spears is known as the "Princess of Pop".

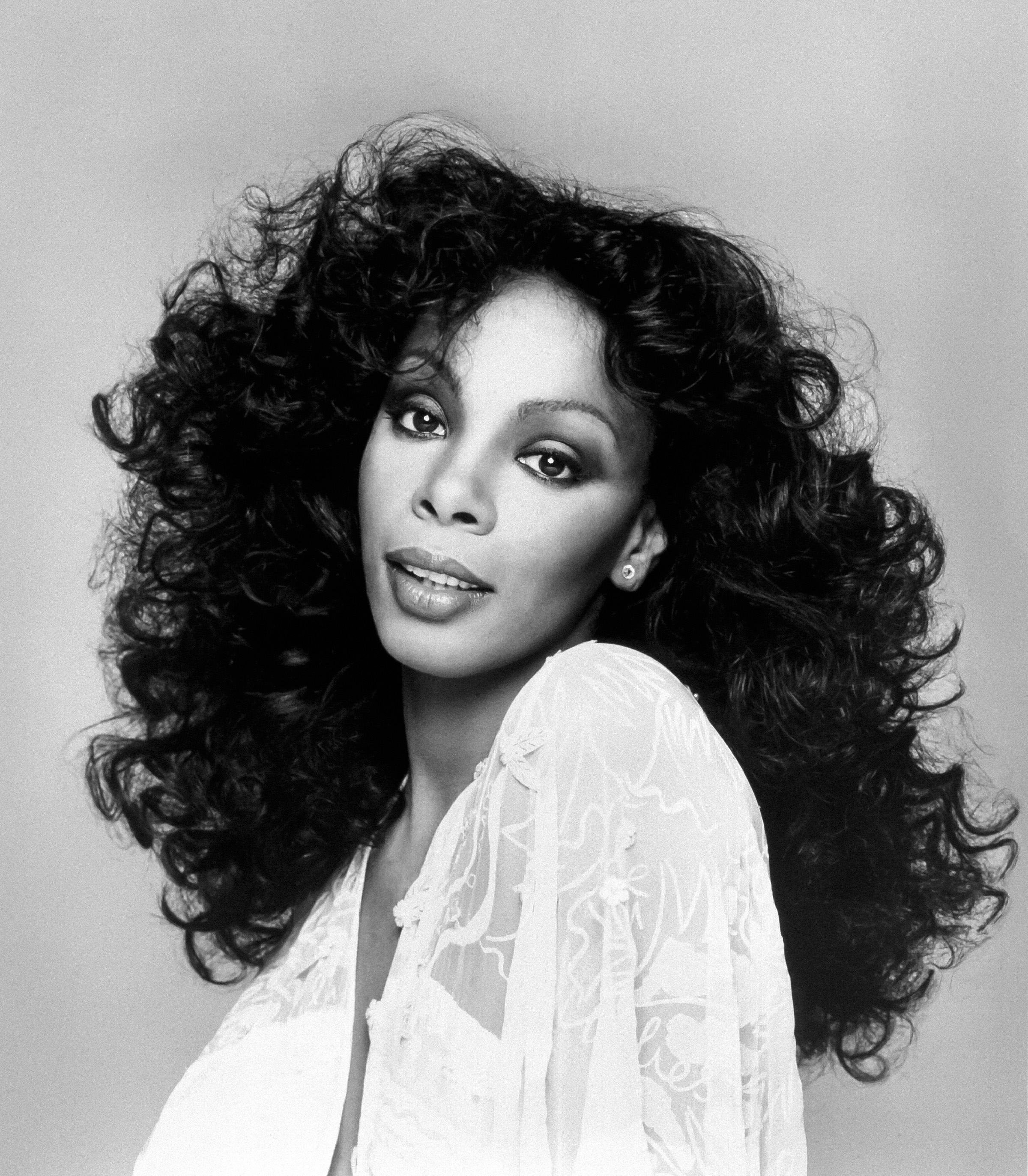
American singer Donna Summer is known as the "Queen of Disco".

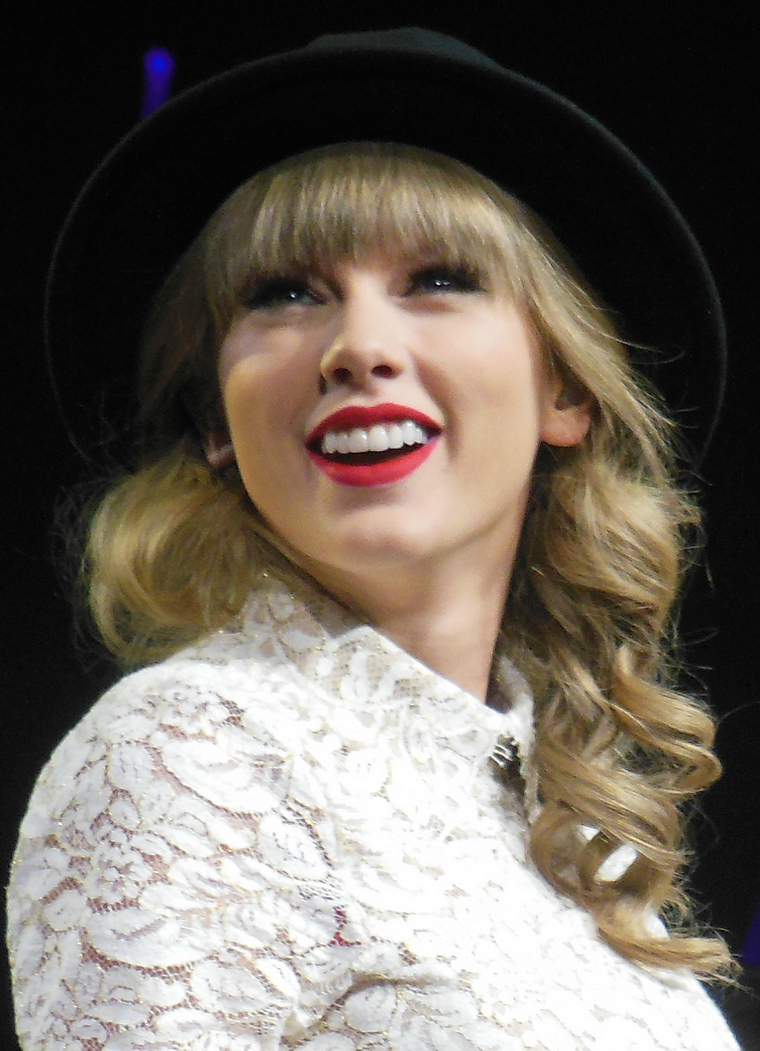
American singer-songwriter Taylor Swift has been referred to as "America's Sweetheart".

Artist	Title	Country	Ref.
Lea Salonga	Pride of the Philippines	Philippines	
Gilberto Santa Rosa	Gentleman of Salsa	Puerto Rico (US)	
Chalino Sánchez	El Rey del Corrido (The King of Ballads)	Mexico	
Šaban Šaulić	The King of Folk	Yugoslavia/Serbia	
Tiwa Savage	Queen of Afrobeats	Nigeria	
Lady Saw	Queen of Dancehall	Jamaica	
Chuck Schuldiner	Godfather of Death Metal	United States	
Shirley Scott	Queen of the Organ	United States	
Gil Scott-Heron	Godfather of Rap	United States	
Jeannie Seely	Miss Country Soul	United States	
Raul Seixas	Pai do Rock Brasileiro (Father of Brazilian Rock)	Brazil	
Selena	Queen of Tejano Music	United States	
Selena	Queen of Cumbia / Queen of Kumbia	United States	
Seo Taiji	President of Culture	South Korea	
Sha Sha	Queen of Amapiano	Zimbabwe	
Shakira	Queen of Latin Music	Colombia	
Shakira	Queen of World Cup	Colombia	
Ravi Shankar	Godfather of World Music	India	
Ros Serey Sothea	Queen with the Golden Voice	Cambodia	
Shin Joong-hyun	Korea's Godfather of Rock	South Korea	
Nina Simone	High Priestess of Soul	United States	
Frank Sinatra	The Chairman of the Board	United States	
Frank Sinatra	The Voice	United States	
Siti Nurhaliza	Voice of Asia	Malaysia	
Bessie Smith	Empress of the Blues	United States	
Patti Smith	Godmother of Punk	United States	
Javier Solís	El Rey del Bolero Ranchero (The King of Bolero Ranchero)	Mexico	
Mercedes Sosa	La Voz de América Latina (The Voice of Latin America)	Argentina	
Britney Spears	Princess of Pop	United States	
Spice	Queen of Dancehall	Jamaica	
Bruce Springsteen	The Boss	United States	
Candi Staton	First Lady of Southern Soul	United States	
George Strait	King of Country	United States	
Johann Strauss II	The Waltz King	Austria	
Suraphol Sombatcharoen	King of Luk Thung	Thailand	
Morton Subotnick	Godfather of Techno	United States	
L. Subramaniam	God of Indian Violin	India	
Elvy Sukaesih	Queen of Dangdut	Indonesia	
Yma Sumac	Queen of Exotica	Peru	
Donna Summer	Queen of Disco	United States	
Joan Sutherland	La Stupenda (The Stupendous One)	Australia	
Taylor Swift	America's Sweetheart	United States	

=== T ===
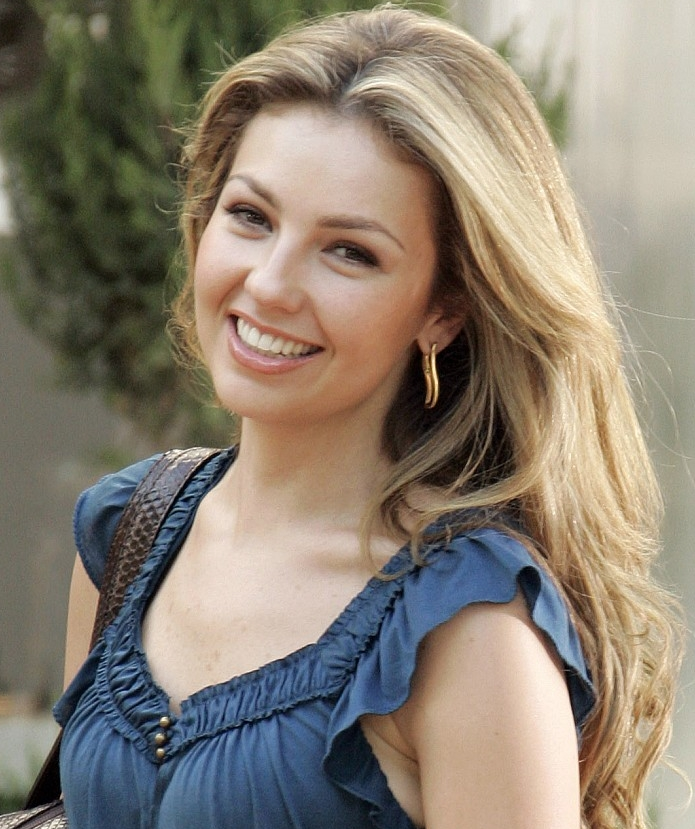
Mexican singer Thalía is known as the "Queen of Latin Pop".

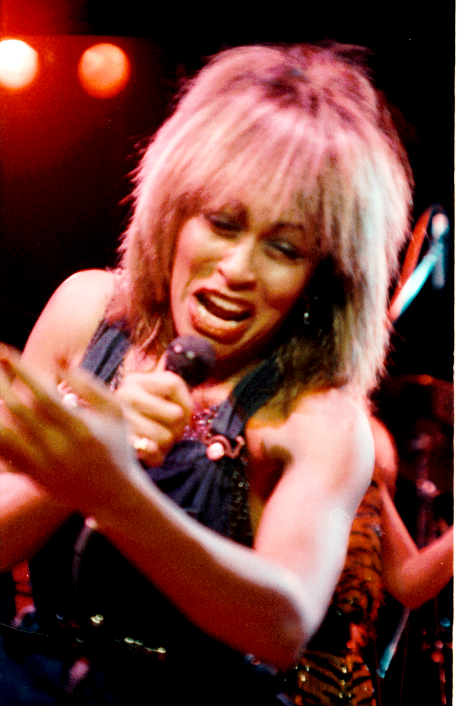
American singer Tina Turner is known as the "Queen of Rock and Roll".

Artist	Title	Country	Ref.
Mariya Takeuchi	Queen of City Pop	Japan	
Tarkan	King of Turkish Pop	Turkey	
Koko Taylor	Queen of the Blues	United States	
Mỹ Tâm	Queen of V-pop	Vietnam	
Teresa Teng	Asia's Eternal Queen of Pop	Taiwan	
Takeshi Terauchi	God of Electric Guitar	Japan	
Thalía	Queen of Latin Pop	Mexico	
Sister Rosetta Tharpe	Godmother of Rock and Roll	United States	
Irma Thomas	Soul Queen of New Orleans	United States	
Tiësto	Godfather of EDM	Netherlands	
Justin Timberlake	Prince of Pop	United States	
Gloria Trevi	Mexican Pop Queen	Mexico	
Jolin Tsai	Queen of C-pop	Taiwan	
Ike Turner	Father of Rock and Roll	United States	
Tina Turner	Queen of Rock and Roll	United States	
Sơn Tùng M-TP	Prince of V-pop	Vietnam	
Shania Twain	Queen of Country Pop	Canada	
Conway Twitty	The High Priest of Country Music	United States	
Tyla	Queen of Popiano	South Africa	

=== U ===
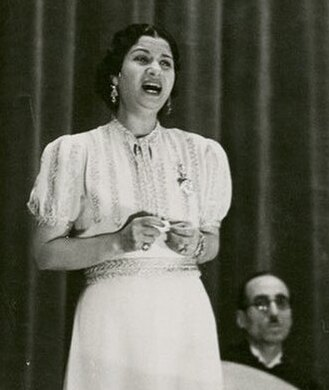
Egyptian singer Umm Kulthum is often referred to as the "Voice of Egypt".

Artist	Title	Country	Ref.
Umm Kulthum	The Voice of Egypt	Egypt	
Uncle Waffles	Princess of Amapiano	South Africa	
Carrie Underwood	Queen of Country	United States	
Usher	King of R&B	United States	
Hikaru Utada	Diva of the Heisei Period	Japan	

=== V ===
Artist	Title	Country	Ref.
Chavela Vargas	Queen of Ranchera	Mexico	
Dolores Vargas	La Terremoto, Queen of Catalan Rumba	Spain	
Luis Vargas	The Supreme King of Bachata	Dominican Republic	
Regine Velasquez	Asia's Songbird	Philippines	
Rui Veloso	Father of Portuguese Rock	Portugal	
Viguen	King of Persian Pop	Iran	

=== W ===
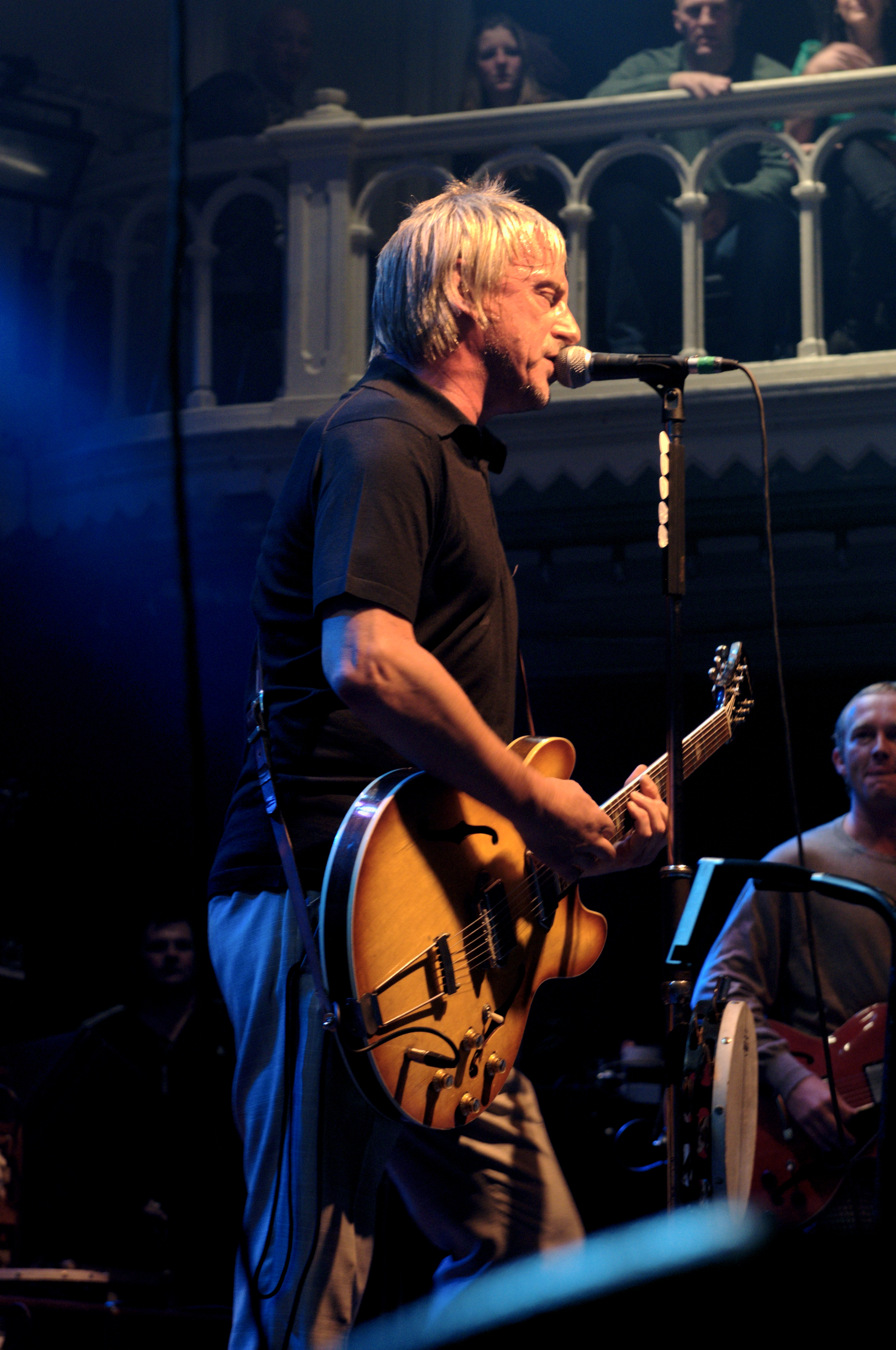
English musician Paul Weller is known as the "The Modfather".

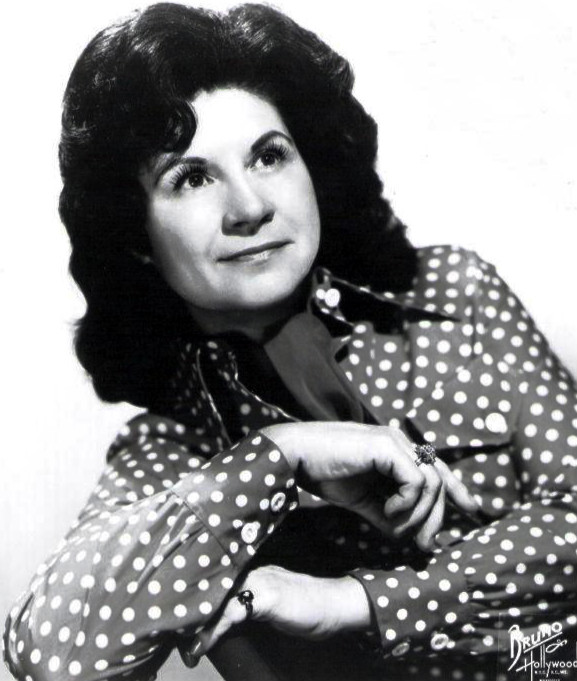
Kitty Wells is often referred to as the "Queen of Country Music".

Artist	Title	Country	Ref.
Paul Weller	The Modfather	United Kingdom	
Kitty Wells	Queen of Country Music	United States	
Paul Whiteman	King of Jazz	United States	
Clarence Wijewardena	Father of Sinhala Pop	Sri Lanka	
Wiley	Godfather of Grime	United Kingdom	
Charlotte de Witte	Queen of Techno	Belgium	
Faye Wong	Heavenly Queen (天后)	China	
Pongsri Woranuch	First Queen of Luk Thung	Thailand	
Tammy Wynette	First Lady of Country	United States	

=== X ===
Artist	Title	Country	Ref.
Nikos Xilouris	Archangel of Crete	Greece	

=== Y ===
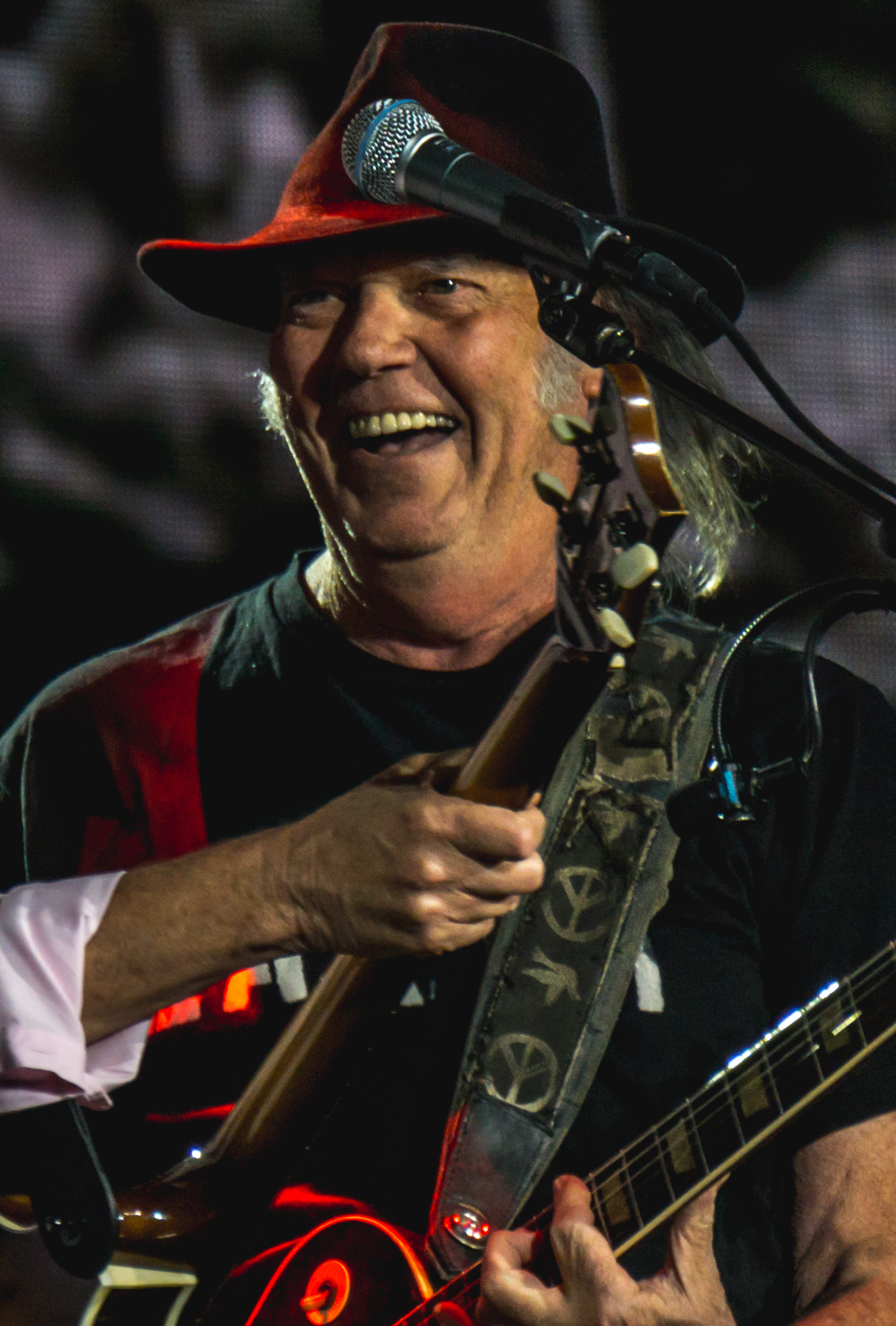
Canadian and American singer Neil Young is referred to as the "Godfather of Grunge".

Artist	Title	Country	Ref.
Daddy Yankee	King of Reggaeton	Puerto Rico (US)	
Tatsuro Yamashita	King of City Pop	Japan	
Neil Young	Godfather of Grunge	Canada/United States	

=== Z ===
Artist	Title	Country	Ref.
Jane Zhang	Dolphin Princess	China	
Yatta Zoe	Queen of Liberian Folk	Liberia	

== Group titles ==
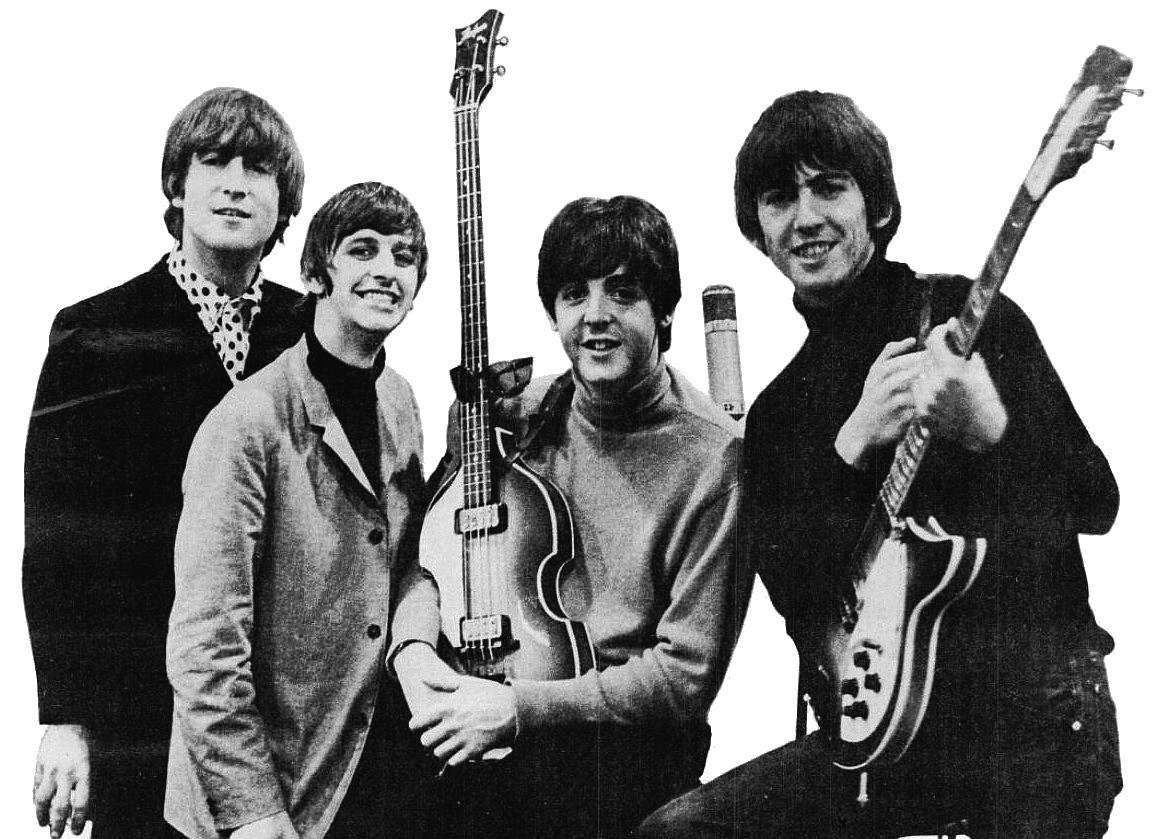
The Beatles are known as "The Fab Four".

Artist	Title	Country	Ref.
2NE1	Queens of K-pop	South Korea	
Aventura	Kings of Modern Bachata	Dominican Republic/United States	
The Beach Boys	America's Band	United States	
The Beatles	The Fab Four	United Kingdom	
Bee Gees	Disco Kings	United Kingdom	
BigBang	Kings of K-pop	South Korea	
Blackpink	Queens of K-pop	South Korea	
BTS	Kings of K-pop	South Korea	
Exo	Nation's Pick	South Korea	
Five Stairsteps	First Family of Soul	United States	
Girls' Generation	Nation's Girl Group	South Korea	
The Jackson 5	First Family of Soul	United States	
Los Ángeles Azules	Kings of Cumbia	Mexico	
Shinee	Princes of K-pop	South Korea	
Super Junior	King of Hallyu Wave	South Korea	
Twice	Nation's Girl Group	South Korea	
SB19	Kings of P-pop	Philippines	

== Collective titles for multiple artists ==
Title	Artists	Country	Ref.
The Belleville Three; The Godfathers of Techno	Juan Atkins	United States	
The Belleville Three; The Godfathers of Techno	Derrick May	United States	
The Belleville Three; The Godfathers of Techno	Kevin Saunderson	United States	
The "Big Four" of Britpop	Oasis	United Kingdom	
The "Big Four" of Britpop	Blur	United Kingdom	
The "Big Four" of Britpop	Suede	United Kingdom	
The "Big Four" of Britpop	Pulp	United Kingdom	
The "Big Four" of Grunge	Nirvana	United States	
The "Big Four" of Grunge	Alice in Chains	United States	
The "Big Four" of Grunge	Pearl Jam	United States	
The "Big Four" of Grunge	Soundgarden	United States	
The "Big Four" of Thrash Metal	Metallica	United States	
The "Big Four" of Thrash Metal	Slayer	United States	
The "Big Four" of Thrash Metal	Megadeth	United States	
The "Big Four" of Thrash Metal	Anthrax	United States	
The Big Three Divas of Japanese Pop	Namie Amuro	Japan	
The Big Three Divas of Japanese Pop	Ayumi Hamasaki	Japan	
The Big Three Divas of Japanese Pop	Hikaru Utada	Japan	
The Emo Trinity	My Chemical Romance	United States	
The Emo Trinity	Fall Out Boy	United States	
The Emo Trinity	Panic! at the Disco	United States	
The Father, the Son, and the Holy Ghost	Buddy Holly	United States	
The Father, the Son, and the Holy Ghost	Ritchie Valens	United States	
The Father, the Son, and the Holy Ghost	The Big Bopper	United States	
The Five Mighty Pop Divas of the Sixties	Aretha Franklin	United States	
The Five Mighty Pop Divas of the Sixties	Martha Reeves	United States	
The Five Mighty Pop Divas of the Sixties	Diana Ross	United States	
The Five Mighty Pop Divas of the Sixties	Dusty Springfield	United Kingdom	
The Five Mighty Pop Divas of the Sixties	Dionne Warwick	United States	
The Four Divas of Vietnam	Mỹ Linh	Vietnam	
The Four Divas of Vietnam	Thanh Lam	Vietnam	
The Four Divas of Vietnam	Hồng Nhung	Vietnam	
The Four Divas of Vietnam	Trần Thu Hà	Vietnam	
The Four Heavenly Kings of Chinese Pop	Jacky Cheung	Hong Kong	
The Four Heavenly Kings of Chinese Pop	Aaron Kwok	Hong Kong	
The Four Heavenly Kings of Chinese Pop	Leon Lai	Hong Kong	
The Four Heavenly Kings of Chinese Pop	Andy Lau	Hong Kong	
The Four Heavenly Kings of Visual Kei	Fanatic Crisis	Japan	
The Four Heavenly Kings of Visual Kei	La'cryma Christi	Japan	
The Four Heavenly Kings of Visual Kei	Malice Mizer	Japan	
The Four Heavenly Kings of Visual Kei	Shazna	Japan	
The Holy Trinity of Pop	Michael Jackson	United States	
The Holy Trinity of Pop	Madonna	United States	
The Holy Trinity of Pop	Prince	United States	
The Holy Trinity of R&B	Rihanna	Barbados	
The Holy Trinity of R&B	Nicki Minaj	Trinidad and Tobago	
The Holy Trinity of R&B	Beyoncé	United States	
The Unholy Trinity of British Hard Rock and Heavy Metal	Black Sabbath	United Kingdom	
The Unholy Trinity of British Hard Rock and Heavy Metal	Deep Purple	United Kingdom	
The Unholy Trinity of British Hard Rock and Heavy Metal	Led Zeppelin	United Kingdom	
The Vocal Trinity	Whitney Houston	United States	
The Vocal Trinity	Mariah Carey	United States	
The Vocal Trinity	Celine Dion	Canada	

== See also ==
- Jazz royalty
- Lists of nicknames
- Madonna (nickname)
- Sobriquet
- Teen idol
- Voice of a generation
