= Tarlov =

Tarlov is a surname. Notable people with the surname include:

- Isadore Tarlov, American neurosurgeon and researcher
- Mark Tarlov, American film producer

- Jessica Tarlov, American political strategist, daughter of Mark Tarlov
- Molly Tarlov, American actress, daughter of Mark Tarlov

== See also ==
- Tarloff
- Tarłów
- Tarlow
