= BNN =

BNN may refer to:

- National Anti-Narcotics Agency (Indonesia) (Badan Narkotika Nasional), a national anti-narcotics agency in Indonesia
- Banana News Network, a comedy TV Show
- Baltic News Network, a business news portal
- BNN (Dutch broadcaster), a radio and television broadcasting organization in the Netherlands
- BNN (Transjakarta), former name of a bus station in Jakarta, Indonesia
- Bayesian neural network, a kind of artificial neural network
- Binary neural network, a kind of artificial neural network
- Boston Neighborhood Network
- BNN Bloomberg (formerly Business News Network), a Canadian financial news channel
- BNN Breaking, a news company headquartered in Hong Kong founded by entrepreneur Gurbaksh Chahal in 2022
- Brønnøysund Airport (by IATA code)
- The radio navigation station upon which the Bovingdon stack (a section of airspace near London) is located
- Bunun language (by ISO 639-3 code)
- Barium sodium niobate
