= Madonna (nickname) =

Singers' nickname derived from Madonna

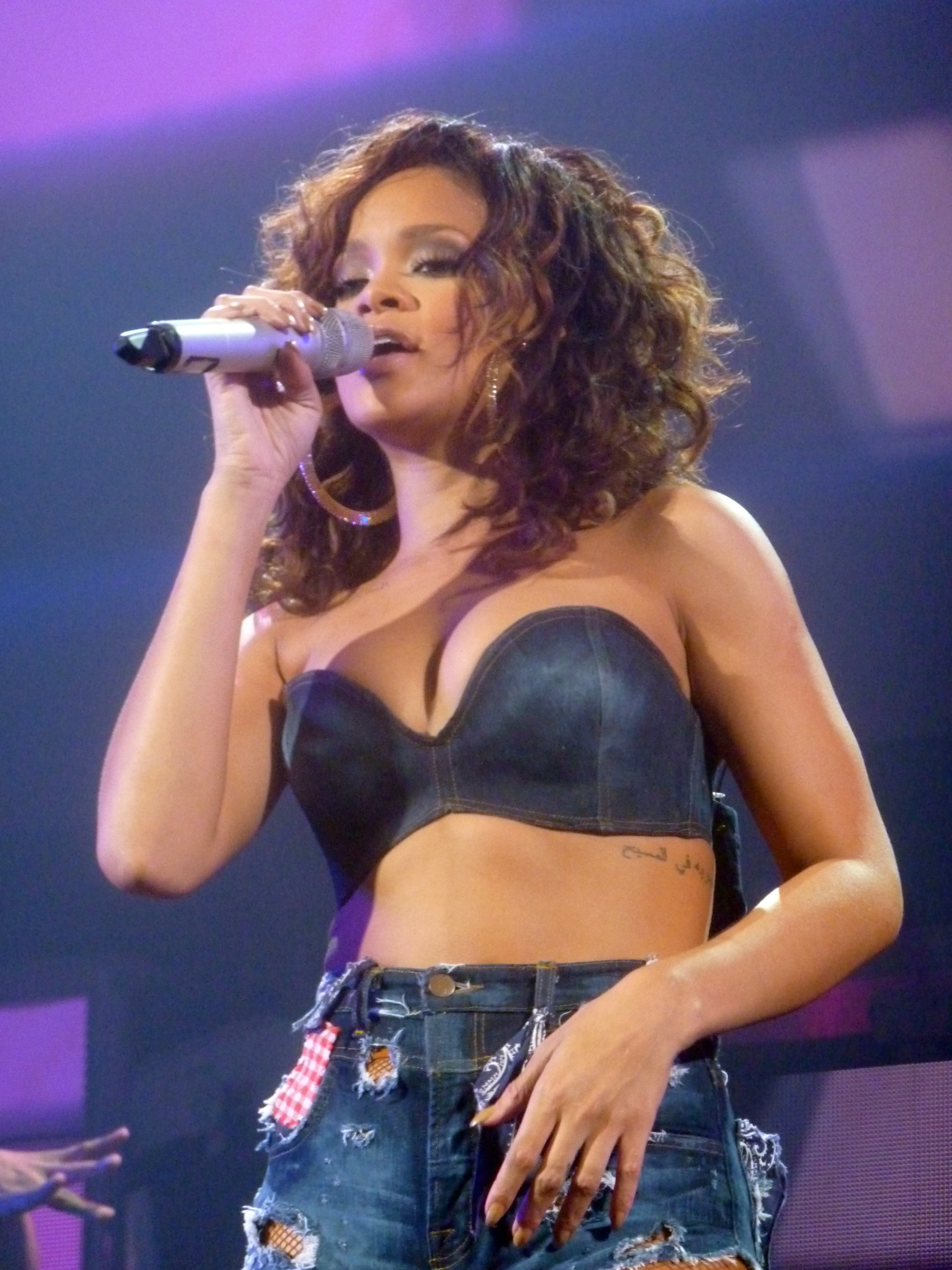
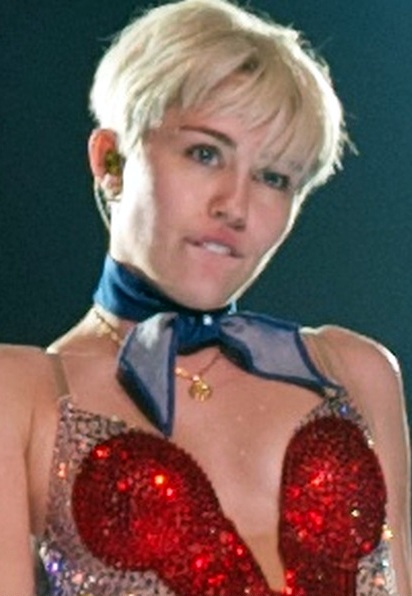
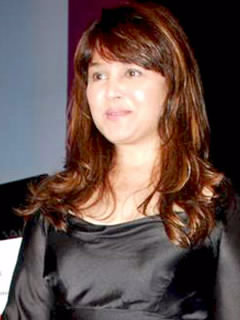
Many artists have been labelled with Madonna-associated nicknames, some of whom are self-declared such as (from left to right) Rihanna as the "Black Madonna", Miley Cyrus as the "Next Madonna", and Alisha Chinai as the "Madonna of India".

In a multi-decades long period, many individuals, mostly female singers received a nickname associated with the name of the American singer-songwriter Madonna (born 1958). Simultaneously, several artists have been identified with the same nickname, and many others have received more than one.

Moniker's visibility is found in devoted articles from publications like Billboard discussing what it means to be a Madonna while others discussed why there exists many artists with the label. Music critic Steven Hyden explains she was often regarded as an archetype in female popular music. Reviewers often addressed comparisons from different measurements and generally all sorts of things attributed to the original Madonna.

The label became visible in the profile of various performers, to which some of them have responded with mixed comments towards the moniker and comparisons with Madonna. Others declared themselves as such or wanted to be a Madonna and media followed suit. More than one performer in the late 20th century, were planned or slightly promoted as a Madonna in their debut by their record labels, according to some of them or media outlets. In the early 21st century, music journalism and authors set a race to find "Madonna's successor", calling in the journey to various as the "next" or "new Madonna". Madonna herself labeled Kanye West either as the "new" or "Black Madonna". References of the label are found in some musical pieces, including songs' titles, or a mention in Eminem's "Fubba U cubba cubba".

== Context ==
=== Critical and media attention ===
You've probably noticed that around the year 2000 the music press began the hunt for the Next Madonna. The original has had a solid thirty-year run as arguably the most successful female pop star in the world, but now the world seems ready for a newer model...
What does it mean to call someone the Next Madonna? How will we recognize the Next Madonna when we see her? And what is the old Madonna to do when we force her to retire?

— Courtney E. Smith in Record Collecting For Girls (2011) discussing the press coverage on this

The nicknames appeared as soon Madonna gained international recognition, commonly dated in 1985. Perhaps one of the first artists who received a Madonna-related moniker was Marie Osmond whom Los Angeles Times named her the "Mormon Madonna" in 1985. Many of the Madonna-associated nicknames in the career of several individuals derived from comparison. Taking Britney Spears as example, Canadian philosopher Paul Thagard explained that "when people say that [Spears] is the new Madonna, they do not literally mean that [she] is Madonna. Rather, they are pointing out some systematic similarities between the two". In 2006, Dorian Lynskey from The Guardian felt and commented that "most female pop stars try to emulate Madonna at some point". French academic Georges-Claude Guilbert wrote in Madonna as Postmodern Myth (2002), "the press never stops comparing female singers to Madonna". The Sydney Morning Herald's Christine Sams similarly commented in 2013: "In the music industry, there have long been comparisons to Madonna thrown around - a pop single here, a fashion look there". In 2011, while commenting the comparison Lady Gaga has faced with Madonna, Rolling Stone described Madonna as "a hard shadow to escape".

In early 2010s, Dutch academics from University of Amsterdam commented female artists "are very often measured against the yardstick that Madonna has become". In 2021, biographers Isa Muguruza and Los Prieto Flores commented that every so often "there is a Mexican, a Latina Madonna and even a Black Madonna" because "she transcended her own figure" and she became in "almost a powerful adjective that translates into a way of doing things". American music critic Steven Hyden opined that "Madonna is regarded as an archetype for pop singers, an example to follow to immortality. If you can change it up like Madonna, maybe you can be Madonna". In 2014, Orlando Sentinel music critic Jim Abbott describe New Madonna as "a necessary pop-culture occupation if ever there was one... [whose] job descriptions are constantly changing." Meanwhile, Reyhan Harmanci from San Francisco Chronicle described this trend:

For decades now, the media have been on a quest to anoint "the next Madonna." A quick Google search unearths more than 79,000 hits for that phrase -- everyone from Rosie Perez to Rihanna has been mentioned. Madonna herself has participated in the search from time to time, while still making albums, releasing videos, bedding young models, scaring the world with the tightest quads in the music business -- in general, still being Madonna... Who knew that mental stability was in the job description to replace Madonna?

=== Aspects ===
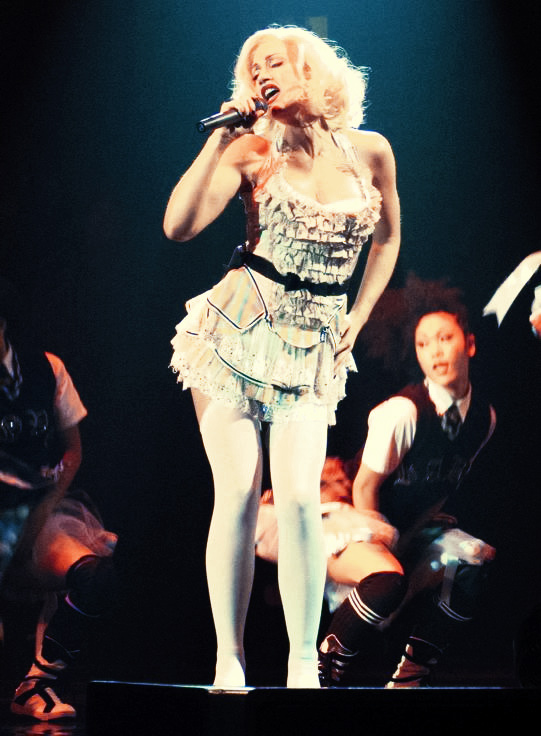
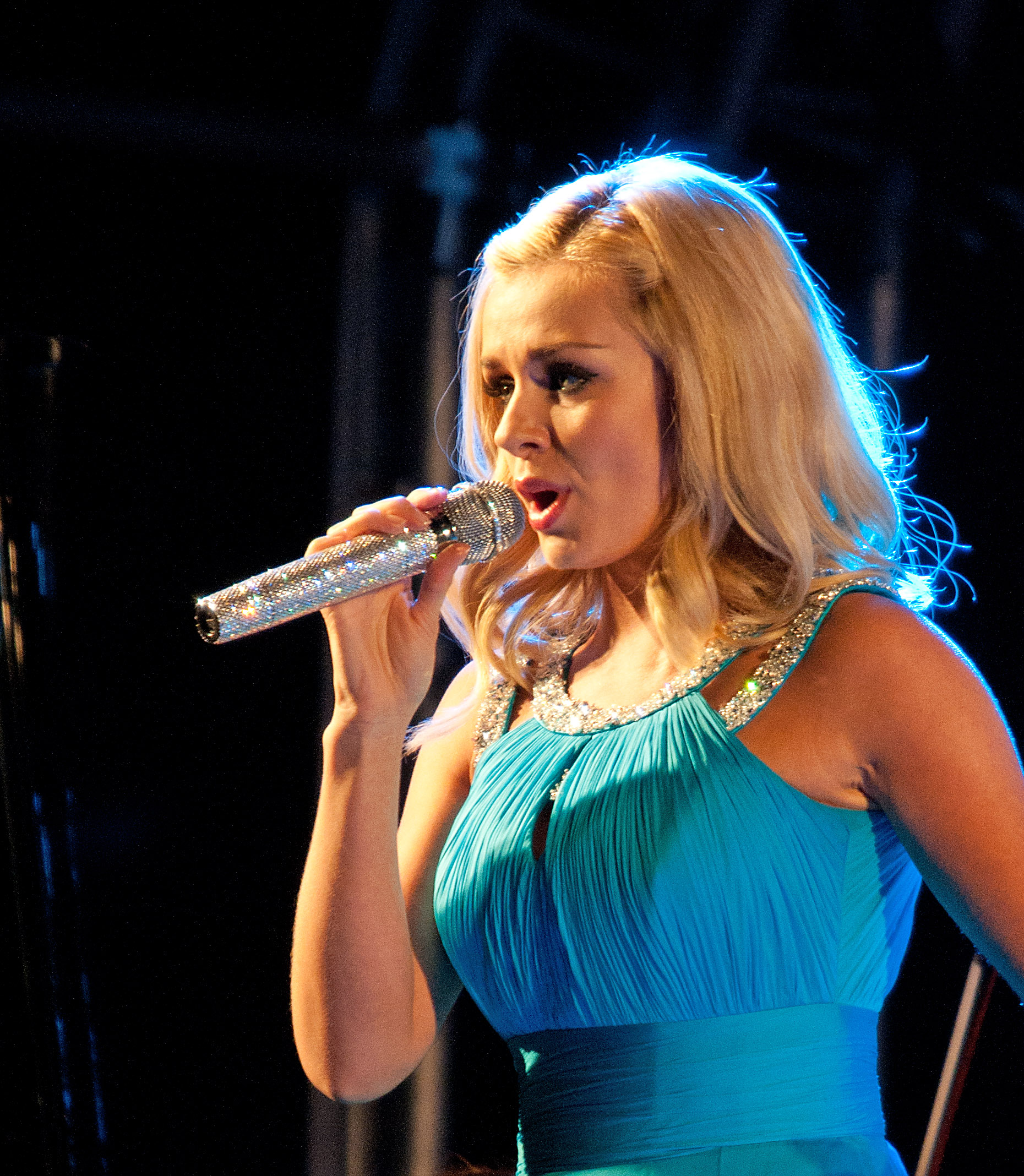
At one time, critics "often compared" to Madonna several artists. From pop stars such as Gwen Stefani (left) to opera singers such as Katherine Jenkins (right).

Beyond comparisons, some media outlets described the reason of calling a performer a Madonna. In 2017, while reviewing Rihanna as the "Black Madonna", Billboard devoted its article explaining what it means be a Madonna. They explained a Madonna has "to assume the role of a commander standing at the frontlines for womanhood", as well "the controversial complexities of human sexuality, despite the inevitable backlash to ensue" to further add a Madonna has "to be a trend-setter" and a muse for producers, songwriters, fashion designers or directors alike and match both her record sales or achievements. Sams, while compared also Rihanna's multi-metric achievements with that of Madonna in her article "Rihanna the new Madonna? In her own way" for The Sydney Morning Herald in 2013, referred, "encompass the scope and success, and global fame of Madonna? That's another league entirely".

In his explanation while mentioned Gaga, Reyhan Harmanci from San Francisco Chronicle saw her as the closer example "than any past wannabes, to further adds aspects such as "iconic style" and "staying power". About her, according to author Tim Delaney (2015), "most popular culture analysts view Lady Gaga as the new Madonna" Others similar claims included "popularity". Is the case of Aidin Vaziri of the same publication regarding the Iranian singer Googoosh, or authors of Encyclopedia of African Peoples and Billboard with Oumou Sangaré ("Madonna of Mali"). Madonna-like impact was also a source for other outlets to call a Madonna other non-pop musicians. This was the case of Cecilia Bartoli and her impact in the classical music stage. Bartoli herself, called Malibran as the "Madonna of her age". While there exists many other reasons, other group called Madonna to artists like Anita Mui with descriptions such as reinvention of image, behavior and boldness. Thus Richard Corliss from Time attributed to Mui, the nickname because "her boldness was not just a sensation but an affront" in the world of Hong Kong popular music.

=== Sourcing and scope ===
Nicknames related to Madonna have been found in publications outside music world. An example is US-government agency USGPO referring to Nune Yesayan as the "Armenian Madonna" in 1999.

The label was used by mass media, outside of music-related publications. A performer like Mylène Farmer have even their Madonna-associated nickname in their biography profile by their record label (Universal Music France). Media often described it as a "nickname", "moniker" or "title" using descriptions such as "dubbed", "named", "widely", "sometimes", "frequently", "known", "hailed" or "branded" by "many" or "by some". Such illustrative examples of previous claims include film director Deeyah Khan to singers Anitta, Brenda Fassie, Mylène Farmer, Pandora and Anita Mui from an array sources such as The Independent, The Guardian, BBC News, News24, Billboard and O Globo among many others. Korean Broadcasting System commented with Uhm Jung-hwa, that she is "often praised" as "the Korean Madonna".

Some nicknames, however, were applied in a determined region, or from an international perspective instead of their own country or vice versa. In Russia Beyond, Vasily Shumov wrote the examples of Russian female pop singers, explaining they don't have an "equivalent" Russian female musician with famous West music figures such as Madonna. Conversely, many Russian female singers were called a Madonna by overseas press, from Alla Pugacheva to Anna Netrebko and Irene Nelson among many others. In 2004, two articles from Czech newspaper Mladá fronta DNES similarly discussed they still missing to have a national-equivalent Madonna (Česká Madonna). Names proposed ranged from Anna K, Dara Rolins to Helena Vondráčková, Petra Janů and Bára Basiková among others. With Vondráčková it was said that "would not be out of the question in the future"; in Basiková's case, Czech website Musicserver discussed her possibility. In Latvia, journalist and founder of Mikrofona ieraksti, Elita Mīlgrāve told Baltic News Network, that they don't have a "Latvian Madonna" but they might have one day.

Cases like Natalia Oreiro were associated with a Madonna-moniker but applied to the region where she was popular despite her cultural roots. She was called such as "Eastern European Madonna", "Argentine Madonna" or a "Russian Madonna" due her success in the latter country. Similarly, American-born singers like Selena and Lisa Lisa, were called "Mexican Madonna" or "Hispanic Madonna". In Selena's case, according to authors of Afterlife as Afterimage: Understanding Posthumous Fame (2005) it was "presumably to provide a vivid referent to non-Latinos".

Many individuals declared themselves as to be a Madonna or wanted to be one, while media outlets followed suit in many of them. Courtney E. Smith includes Miley Cyrus, Rihanna, and Avril Lavigne as examples. Others such as Pixie Lott, Christina Aguilera and Wendy Sulca have also declared wanted to be a Madonna at some stage of their career. Sulca reminded that many artists want to be a Madonna. Another example is Jamaican singer Tifa, who declared wanted to be the "Jamaican Madonna". In 2007, Soraya Arnelas declared not be ready to be a Madonna but almost a decade later, in 2016, she described herself as the "Spanish Madonna". American rapper Lil' Kim also called herself the "Black Madonna". In 2018, Azealia Banks explained in Twitter why she feels like "the Black Madonna": "I'm really the Black Madonna [...] Y'all thought Gaga was the new supreme after Madonna but it's really me. You will learn very soon".

Others were called by an individual as a Madonna but perhaps were not followed by other media reports. In 2019 for instance, designer Marko Monroe deemed Lizzo as the "Madonna of her generation", while Farina also considered Tokischa as the Madonna-equivalent to the urban music of her generation. Robert Christgau called Sinéad O'Connor a "folkie Madonna", while Whitney Houston was called the "Black Madonna" in 1988 by El País's Santiago Alcanda. Mónica Naranjo was a similar example, as her hairdresser wanted to present her as the "Spanish Madonna". Before fame, others called themselves as such. Toni Braxton, recalls: "In high school, I was trying to be the Black Madonna".

== Impact ==
Terri Rupar from Washington Post asked: Does every country have a Madonna?.

=== On artists' careers ===
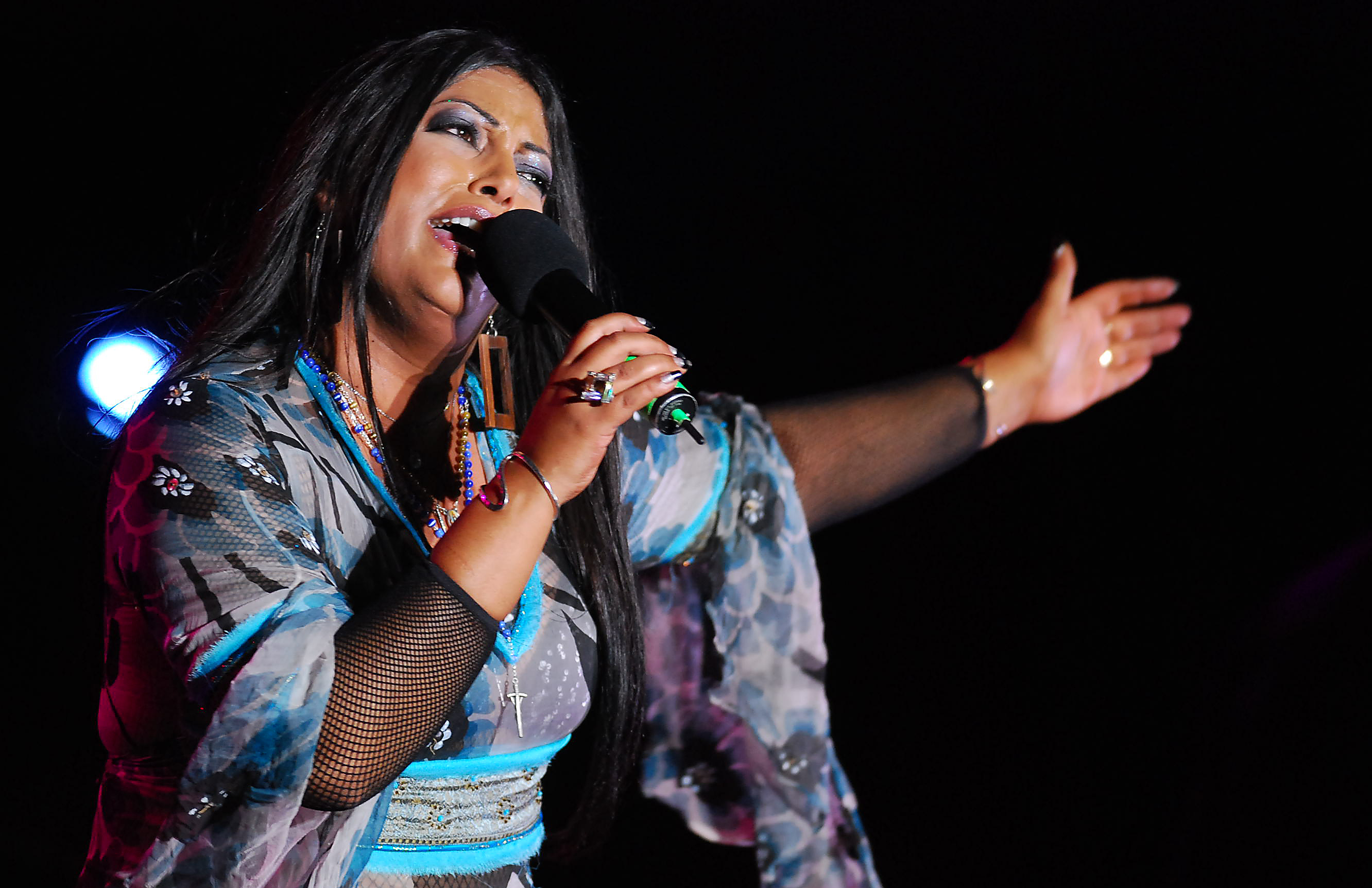
Planned to be a Madonna-equivalent by her record label Reprise Records, La India later chose her stage name to refute this idea.

According to media reports or some artists themselves, a bunch of artists were planned by their managers or record labels to be marketed as a Madonna or an associated style. This has been the case with Martika by CBS Records, Byanka from Mexico, and La India by Reprise; La India commented that this inspired her to choose her stage name because she avoided that label. Ana Curra also said that her label Hispavox planned to promote her as the "Spanish Madonna". Other artists slightly "promoted" as Madonnas, were Natasha Alexandrovna called the "Russian Madonna", and according to Ioannis Polychronakis from Linköping University, Anna Vissi was "loudly promoted as the 'Greek Madonna'". In other reports, some artists like Lisa Lisa were "billed" as a Madonna. British opera singer Lesley Garrett was promoted by her record company with a "Madonna of the opera stage image"; various media outlets like Time magazine compared her with Madonna, and others dubbed her the "Madonna of the opera world". On the report of Opera magazine in 2001, she once confessed that she planned to "emulate Madonna Ciccone".

In Music and Capitalism: A History of the Present (2016), author referred that various non-Western musicians decades ago attempted to fashion themselves into the next Madonna or Michael Jackson. In a 1993 interview with Los Angeles Times, Gloria Trevi said: "Many artists in Mexico fight to be the Latina Madonna". Back in 1986, Singaporean newspaper The Straits Times discussed how a number of artists in Asia were compared to Madonna, receiving a Madonna-moniker, but also explored how it helped boost their popularity. They described:

THE Madonna fever has spread to the East and we see young female singers emerging in the likes of the superstar. Whether they do it intentionally or not, the Madonna image has certainly helped them attract attention from fans and the media.... The other "Madonna" [...] Anna Ueyama [...] does not mind being named after a superstar as it helps boost her popularity, too.

According to Time magazine, one local paper even reprinted (verbatim) an interview with Madonna, replacing her name with South African artist Brenda Fassie. On the other hand, scholars Gregory Booth and Bradley Shope, noticed that Alisha Chinai "gained notoriety as the 'Indian Madonna'", while ethnomusicologist Bruno Nettl opined that she earned a reputation by catering to the South Asian interest in Madonna, "recasting both the image and the music of the global star in South Asian cultural terms and in the Hindi language". According to Mirna Abdulaal of Egyptian Streets, in the case of Egyptian singer Simone Philip Kamel "countless producers wanted to put their hands" in Kamel, noted her as a "Madonna" lookalike, and for which "Madonna Masr" later came to be one of her nicknames in the country.

=== Artists' reactions ===
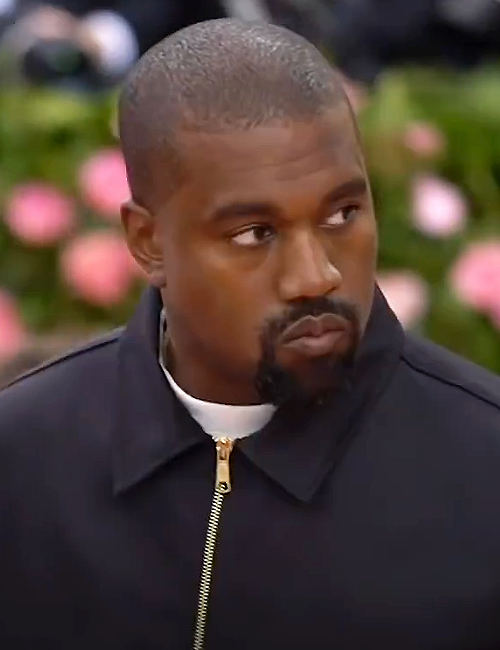
Madonna called Kanye West (pictured) "the new Madonna" and "the Black Madonna".

In 2015, Madonna was quoted as saying Kanye West was either the "new" or "Black Madonna". As a visible label to many, various of these performers have commented the comparison and nickname with mixed responses. In her case, Lady Gaga recalls: "I always used to say to people, when they would say, 'Oh, she's the next Madonna.' No, I'm the next Iron Maiden". Insooni also denied her Madonna-nickname saying: "I'm Korea's Insooni, and always will be". Others similarly refuted the tag, or comparison, including Argentine singer Patricia Sosa, English soprano singer Sarah Brightman, American singer Hilary Duff, and Australian musician Kylie Minogue.

In positive reactions, Jolin Tsai whose has been called a Madonna, responded to El País the comparison saying that "Madonna is a goal", and is a reflection of a woman who does what she sets out to do. In a conversation with German magazine Focus, Serbian singer Jelena Karleuša accepted the nickname associated with Madonna. American rapper Lil' Kim also did it. Brazilian artist Anitta deemed it as an "honor", and similar feelings was shared by Mexican singer Paulina Rubio saying she was "proud" since are her fans "who decide it". BBC News let Ayi Jihu known of her nickname "China's Madonna" calling it as an "accolade" and with Jihu responding "I'm very honoured".

Other artists declared to be "tired" of being compared and receiving a moniker related to her, such as Latina singers Gloria Estefan or Gloria Trevi. Estefan confessed in 1989: "I'm getting bored being compared to Madonna". In a similar situation, Spanish singer Marta Sánchez reported that even when she lived in New York, people called her "Madonna" all the time. While she found "flattering" being compared to her, also commented it was exhausted saying "I don't want to be a Madonna".

Other artists felt flattered by the comparison, admiring Madonna but not liking the moniker. Albanian singer Bleona which publicly discussed this association is part of this group. Italian singer, Ivana Spagna said: "I never wanted to be another Madonna, even though some people compared me to her. Madonna is Madonna, and nobody else could be like that". German singer Nena was neutral towards the comparison. South African singer, Brenda Fassie, according to Time magazine liked Madonna but doesn't understand the comparison. "Maybe it's because of the way we dress", she said.

=== Criticisms ===
Sergio del Amo, editor of El País, observed the year 2017 as the political correctness era in the pop stardom, with several female singers releasing records and presenting a softer image such as Miley Cyrus (Younger Now), Lady Gaga (Joanne) and Kesha (Rainbow)—as Madonna did with Something to Remember and Bedtime Stories. This led the author to conclude that "nobody wants to be Madonna anymore" as the price to pay of a sexual image is "much higher" than it think. Writing for the Washington Post, Richard Harrington called it a "dreadful nickname" when referring PJ Harvey's moniker of "the indie Madonna". After being called a Madonna, Christina Rosenvinge criticized "female music has become a slutty contest".

Some journalists seemed a "meaningless analogy" comparison with Madonna. Is the case of British journalist Nigel Williamson with Oumou Sangare. As "Madonna" was a common nickname in the case of American singer Selena, music executive José Behar questioned that she would not be "comfortable" with that; and the only thing she had in common with Madonna was the bustiers. According to Guilbert, Celine Dion was often hailed as the "anti–Madonna".

=== References ===
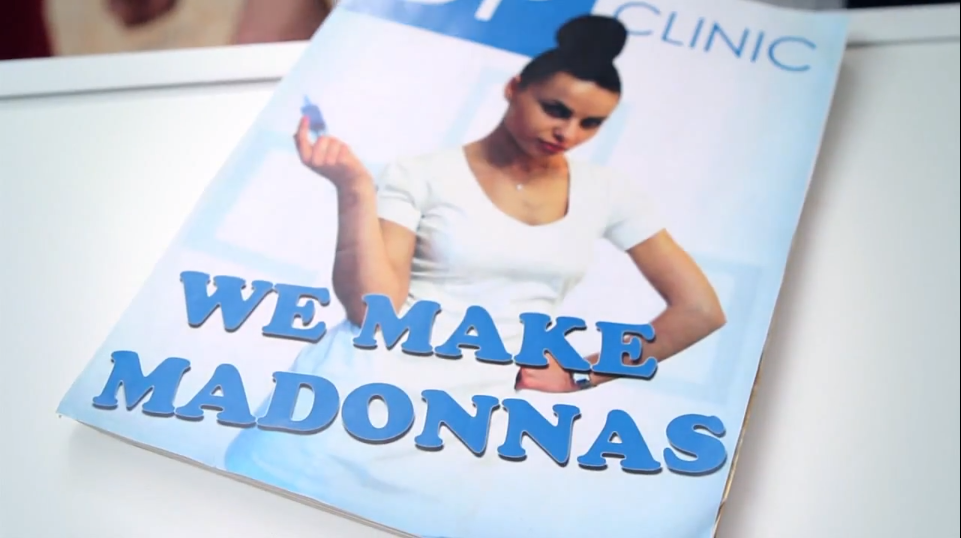
A screenshot of music video "I Wanna Be Madonna" by No Comment Band, 2011

Artists such as Venus D-Lite, Sarit Hadad or Hi Fashion have released songs with the title "I'm Not Madonna". Indian rapper Baba Sehgal titled an album Main Bhi Madonna (I Am Also Madonna), while Eminem included a verse in "Fubba U cubba cubba". Alisha Chinai named her 1992 album as Madonna of India. Collins COBUILD Advanced Dictionary (2016), included a sentence referring to a singer as "billed as the next Madonna".

In 2024, Bryce Vine and electronic duo Cash Cash promoted and released their song "New Madonna". However, its reception at streaming services such as Spotify, was compared by Jenesaispop's Francisco Gámiz, with other tracks inspired by Madonna, such as Drake's "Madonna" (2015), Bausa's "Madonna" (2017) and Natanael Cano and Óscar Maydon's "Madonna", a song released also on 2024, and which was called by the editor as the most famous "Madonna song" not sung by Madonna.

=== Outside of music industry ===
This label transcended both the music and entertainment industries. Politicians such as Donald Trump and Hillary Clinton were discussed as to be a Madonna with the same analogy of doing things or a Madonna-like impact in their areas. Eva Perón was called the political Madonna of Argentina in a 1997 article of The Baltimore Sun. U.S. News & World Report called Dennis Rodman, "a black and male version of Madonna". Argentines plastic artists Sergio De Loof or Marta Minujín were nicknamed or declared themselves to be a Madonna. Len Blavatnik, was called "Madonna of billionaires". In a 1999 article, Slate magazine, listed as the "Madonnas" of the age of stock market, and celebration of the entrepreneur to individuals from Bill Gates to Steve Ballmer. Shiva Rea, nicknamed "the Madonna of yoga", dismissed the tag. How to Fail as a Popstar is an adaptation about character's lifelong dreams of becoming "a brown Madonna".

== Selected list ==
Various artists received more than one nickname related-to-Madonna; those with more than one nickname are highlighted in bold. Male are distinguished with the gender symbol (♂).

=== By region ===
Title (Note: Rarely figured as Madonna's answer to a specific nation or genre. Also as the "local version".)	Individual(s)	Ref.
"Asian Madonna" "Madonna of Asia"	A-Mei; Anita Mui; BoA; Christina Aguilar; Jolin Tsai; Namie Amuro; Sa Dingding	
"Central Asian Madonna" "Madonna of Central Asia"	Gulnara Karimova ("GooGooSha"); Yulduz Usmonova	
"African Madonna" "Madonna of Africa"	Brenda Fassie; Oumou Sangaré	
"the Madonna of West Africa"	Angélique Kidjo	
"the Madonna of Middle East" "Madonna of East"	**Anita Mui**; Ofra Haza; Nancy Ajram; Noa; Sabah	
"European Madonna" "Madonna of Europe"	Sandra	
"Balkan Madonna" "Madonna of Balkans"	Azis ♂; Ceca Ražnatović; Jelena Karleuša; Marina Arsenijevic	
"Soviet Madonna"	Alla Pugacheva; Laima Vaikule (a.k.a. "Vaikule"); Natali (a.k.a. "Natalia")	
"Yugoslavian Madonna" "Madonna of Yugoslavia"	Lepa Brena	
"Comecon Madonna" "Madonna of the Comecon"	Maryla Rodowicz	
"South American Madonna" (la Madonna de América del Sur)	Xuxa	

=== By nationality ===
Title	Individual(s)	Country	Language original-title	Ref.
"Albanian Madonna" "Madonna of Albania"	Bleona	Albania	Unknown	
"Australian Madonna" "Madonna of Australia"	Kylie Minogue	Australia	—N/a	
"Armenian Madonna" "Madonna of Armenia"	Nune Yesayan (a.k.a. "Nune")	Armenia	Unknown	
Local version of Madonna (Benin)	**Angélique Kidjo**	Benin	Unknown	
"Belgian Madonna"	Petra de Steur	Belgium	Belgische Madonna	
"Brazilian Madonna" "Madonna of Brazil"	Anitta; Daniela Mercury; Gretchen; Joelma; Regina Restelli; Tati Quebra-Barraco; **Xuxa**	Brazil	Madonna brasileira	
Local version of Madonna (Bulgaria)	Azis ♂	Bulgaria	Unknown	
"Canadian Madonna" "Madonna of Canada" "Quebec's Madonna"	Mitsou	Canada	—N/a	
"Chilean Madonna" "Madonna of Chile"	Javiera Mena	Chile	Madonna de Chile la Madonna chilena	
"Colombian Madonna" "Madonna of Colombia"	Shakira	Colombia	Madonna de Colombia la Madonna colombiana	
"Cuban Madonna" "Madonna of Cuba"	Albita	Cuba	Madonna cubana la Madonna de Cuba	
"Madonna of Croatia" "Croatian Madonna"	Severina; Tatiana Cameron ("Tajči")	Croatia	Unknown	
"Chinese Madonna" "Madonna of China"	**A-Mei**; **Anita Mui**; Ayi Jihu; **Jolin Tsai**; **Sa Dingding**; Wei Wei	China	中国麦当娜	
"Madonna Mars"; Madonna of Egypt	Simone Philip Kamel	Egypt	Unknown	
"French Madonna" "Madonna of France"	Mylène Farmer; Patricia Kaas	France	Madonna française	
"German Madonna" "Madonna of Germany"	Marianne Rosenberg; **Sandra**	Germany	Deutsche Madonna	
"Greek Madonna" "Madonna of Greece"	Anna Vissi; Nana Mouskouri	Greece	Unknown	
"Madonna's Hong Kong" "Madonna of Hong Kong"	Amy Yip; **Anita Mui**	Hong Kong	香港麥當娜	
"Indian Madonna" "Madonna of India"	Alisha Chinai; Asha Bhosle	India	Unknown	
"Iranian Madonna" "Madonna of Iran"	Googoosh (b. Faegheh Atashin)	Iran	Unknown	
"Israeli Madonna" "Madonna of Israel"	**Ofra Haza**; Rita; Sarit Hadad	Israel	Unknown	
"Jamaican Madonna" "Madonna of Jamaica"	Lady Saw (b. Marion Hall)	Jamaica	—N/a	
"Japanese Madonna" "Madonna of Japan"	Ayumi Hamasaki; Hikaru Utada; Minako Honda; **Namie Amuro**; Nokko	Japan	Unknown	
"Lebanese Madonna" "Madonna of Lebanon"	Elissa	Lebanon	مادونا اللبنانية	
"Mexican Madonna" "Madonna of Mexico"	Alejandra Guzmán; Gloria Trevi; Marisela; Paulina Rubio; Selena; Thalía; Yuri	Mexico; United States	Madonna de Mexico la Madonna mexicana	
"Mali's Madonna" "Madonna of Mali"	**Oumou Sangaré**	Mali	Unknown	
"Madonna of Norway"	Morten Abel ♂	Norway	Norges Madonna	
"Pakistani Madonna" "Madonna of Pakistan"	Humaira Arshad	Pakistan	Unknown	
"Romanian Madonna" "Madonna of Romania"	Loredana Groza	Romania	Madonna României; Madonna de România	
"Russian Madonna" "Madonna of Russia"	**Alla Pugacheva**; Anna Netrebko; Irene Nelson; Masha Rasputina (a.k.a. Maria Rasputina); Natasha Alexandrovna; Sadie Nine; Sasha Gradiva; Valeriya	Russia	Pусская Мадонна	
"Madonna of Serbia"	Dragana Mirković	Serbia	Unknown	
"Korean Madonna" "Madonna of Korea"	Insooni; Kim Wan-sun; Seo In-young; Uhm Jung-hwa	South Korea	Unknown	
"Spanish Madonna" "Madonna of Spain"	Alaska; Christina Rosenvinge; Leticia Sabater; Luz Casal; Marta Sánchez	Spain	Madonna de España la Madonna española	
"South African Madonna" "Madonna of South Africa"	**Brenda Fassie**	South Africa	Unknown	
"Sudan's Madonna" "Madonna of Sudan"	Hana Bulu-Bulu	Sudan	Unknown	
"Madonna of Sweden" "Swedish Madonna"	Pandora; Robyn	Sweden	Sveriges Madonna	
"Madonna of Taiwan"	**A-Mei**	Taiwan	臺灣瑪丹娜	
"Madonna of Thailand" "Thai's Madonna"	**Christina Aguilar**; Mai Charoenpura	Thailand	Unknown	
"Turkish Madonna" "Madonna of Turkey"	Aleyna Tilki; Banu Alkan; Gülşen; Hande Yener; Sezen Aksu; Yonca Evcimik	Turkey	Türkiye'nin Madonna; Türk Madonnası; Türkiye’nin Madonnası	
"Ukrainian Madonna" "Madonna of Ukraine"	Ruslana	Ukraine	Unknown	
"Madonna of Uzbekistan"	Yulduz Usmonova	Uzbekistan	Unknown	
"Venezuelan Madonna" "Madonna of Venezuela"	Melissa Griffiths	Venezuela	Madonna de Venezuela la Madonna venezolana	
"Madonna of Vietnam" "Vietnamese Madonna"	Lynda Trang Đài	Vietnam	Madonna của Việt	
"Madonna of Zimbabwe"	Portia Gwanzura	Zimbabwe	Unknown	

=== By race and ethnicity ===
Title	Individual(s)	Ref.
"Arab's Madonna"	Haifa Wehbe	
"Black Madonna" (or "African-American Madonna")	Beyoncé (Note: In 2017, during her pregnancy she was referenced as a Black Madonna, because the religious theme. However, international media outlets have called her a Madonna since the early-2000s in reference to the singer.); **Brenda Fassie**; Lil' Kim; Rihanna	
"Latin Madonna" (Madonna latina)	Gloria Estefan; **Gloria Trevi**; **Marisela**; **Paulina Rubio**; **Selena**; **Shakira**; **Thalía**; **Xuxa**; **Yuri**	
"Hispanic Madonna" (Madonna hispana)	**Gloria Estefan**; Lisa Lisa; **Selena**; **Yuri**	

=== By music genres ===
Artist(s)	Title(s)	Ref.
Amy Grant	"Madonna of gospel music" "Madonna of contemporary gospel"	
**Ayumi Hamasaki**	"Madonna of J-Pop"	
**Brenda Fassie**	"Madonna of South African music"	
Cecilia Bartoli	"Madonna of the classical music"	
**Hanan Bulu-Bulu**	"Madonna of the Sudanese pop"	
Ivy Queen	"Madonna of the Reggaeton"	
Lesley Garrett	"Madonna of opera"	
**Lil' Kim**	"Madonna of Hip hop music"	
Marilyn Manson ♂	"Madonna of metal music"	
Martirio	"Flamenco Madonna"	
PJ Harvey	"the indie Madonna"	
Salt-N-Pepa	"Madonnas of rap music"	
**Selena**	"Tejano Madonna" "Tex-Mex Madonna"	
Tarja Turunen	"Madonna of metal music"	
Tairrie B	"Madonna of rap music"	
Vanessa-Mae	"Madonna of classical music"	

=== By generation ===
Titles	Artists	Ref.
"New/Next Madonna" the "future Madonna" "Modern Madonna" "Madonna of the Millennium"	Avril Lavigne; Britney Spears; Christina Aguilera; Gwen Stefani; Ivana Spagna; Lady Gaga; Miley Cyrus; Nelly Furtado; Martika	
"Madonna of our generation" "Madonna of Generation Z" this "generation's Madonna" "Madonna of streaming era"	**Anitta**; Billie Eilish; Dua Lipa; Pink; Taylor Swift	
"Madonna of children" "Madonna of teenagers" "Teenager Madonna" "Grandma Madonna of India"	Cristina D'Avena; Tini Stoessel; **Xuxa**; Asha Bhosle	
"Madonna before Madonna"	Betty Davis	

=== By beliefs and professions ===
Individual	Title(s)	Ref.
Camille Paglia	"Madonna of academe"	
Deeyah Khan (a.k.a. Deepika Thathaal)	"Muslim Madonna"	
Hillary Clinton	"Madonna of American politics"	
Len Blavatnik ♂	"Madonna of billionaires"	
Madhuri Dixit	"Madonna of Bollywood dance"	
Marie Osmond	"Mormon Madonna"	
Marta Minujín	"the Madonna of arts"	
Shiva Rea	"the Madonna of yoga"	

== See also ==
- Madonna wannabe
- Madonna impersonator
- Honorific nicknames in popular music

== Book sources ==
- Ainley, Rosa (2002). New Frontiers of Space, Bodies and Gender. Routledge. ISBN 1134732805.
- Arena, James (2017). Europe's Stars of '80s Dance Pop: 32 International Music Legends Discuss Their Careers. McFarland. ISBN 978-1476630144.
- Aspinall, Julie (2008). Kylie. John Blake. ISBN 978-1843586937.
- Barash, Jeffrey Andrew (2016). Collective Memory and the Historical Past. University of Chicago Press. ISBN 978-0226399294.
- Besher, Alexander; Wilcock, John (1991). The Pacific Rim Almanac. Harper Perennial. ISBN 0062715240.
- Booth, Gregory D.; Shope, Bradley (2014). More Than Bollywood: Studies in Indian Popular Music. Oxford University Press. ISBN 978-0199928835.
- Boyd Jones, Veda (2013). Selena. Infobase Publishing. ISBN 978-1438146379.
- Burgan, Michael (2007). Teens in Israel. Capstone Publishers. ISBN 978-0756524432.
- Clark, Robert P. (2002). Global Awareness: Thinking Systematically about the World. Rowman & Littlefield. ISBN 0742515931.
- Chan, Kwok-Bun (2014). Chinese Entertainment. Routledge. ISBN 978-1317977988.
- Connell, John; Gibson, Chris (2003). Sound Tracks: Popular Music Identity and Place. Routledge. ISBN 1134699123.
- Davis, Edward Lawrence (2005). Encyclopedia of Contemporary Chinese Culture. Taylor & Francis. ISBN 041577716X.
- Davis, Craig S. (2003). The Middle East For Dummies. Wiley. ISBN 0764554832.
- Delaney, Tim (2015). Connecting Sociology to Our Lives: An Introduction to Sociology. Routledge. ISBN 978-1317262138.
- Evans, David T. (2018). Phantasmagoria: Sociology of Opera. Routledge. ISBN 978-0429757686.
- Fuhr, Michael (2015). Globalization and Popular Music in South Korea. Taylor & Francis. ISBN 978-1317556909.
- Fryer, Paul (2014). Opera in the Media Age: Essays on Art, Technology and Popular Culture. McFarland. ISBN 978-0786473298.
- Gage, Simon (2002). Queer: The Ultimate User's Guide. Unanimous. ISBN 1903318475.
- Goren, Lilly J. (2009). You've Come A Long Way, Baby: Women, Politics, and Popular Culture. University Press of Kentucky. ISBN 978-0813173405.
- Guilbert, Georges-Claude (2015). Madonna as Postmodern Myth. McFarland. ISBN 978-0-786-48071-5.
- Guilbert, Georges-Claude (2018). Gay Icons. McFarland. ISBN 978-1476633015.
- Harper Collins Publishers (2016). Collins Cobuild Advanced Dictionary of English. Gramedia Pustaka Utama. ISBN 978-6020323299.
- Hoffmann, Frank W. (2005). Rhythm and Blues, Rap, and Hip-hop. Facts On File. ISBN 0816069808.
- Hoppenstand, Gary (2007). The Greenwood Encyclopedia of World Popular Culture. Vol. 4. Greenwood Press. ISBN 978-0313332746.
- Irvin, Jim (2007). The Mojo Collection. Vol. 4. Canongate Books. ISBN 978-1847676436.
- Jeffries, Stan (2003). Encyclopedia of World Pop Music, 1980-2001. Greenwood Press. ISBN 0313315477.
- Johannesson, Ika (2012). Min mardröm är att bli en Madonna - Ett reportage om Robyn ur magasinet Filter (in Swedish). Leopard förlag. ISBN 978-9185279173.
- Jones, Steve; Jensen, Joli (2005). Afterlife as Afterimage: Understanding Posthumous Fame. Peter Lang. ISBN 0820463655.
- Joseph, Gilbert M.; Henderson, Timothy J. (2002). The Mexico Reader: History, Culture, Politics. Duke University Press. ISBN 0822330423.
- Kaeter, Margaret (2004). The Caucasian republics. Facts On File. ISBN 0816052689.
- Keaton, Diane (2014). Let's Just Say It Wasn't Pretty. Random House Publishing Group. ISBN 978-0812994278.
- Kumar, Raj (2003). Essays on Indian Music. Discovery Publishing House. ISBN 8171417191.
- Lazerine, Devin; Lazerine, Cameron (2008). Rap-Up: The Ultimate Guide to Hip-Hop and R&B. UK Hachette. ISBN 978-0446511629.
- Leibetseder, Doris (2016). Queer Tracks: Subversive Strategies in Rock and Pop Music. Taylor & Francis. ISBN 978-1317072584.
- Lewis, Glen (2007). Virtual Thailand: The Media and Cultural Politics in Thailand, Malaysia and Singapore. Taylor & Francis. ISBN 978-1134217670.
- MacFadyen, David (2002). Estrada?!. McGill-Queen's University Press. ISBN 0773523715.
- Martínez, Ruben (1992). The Other Side: Fault Lines, Guerrilla Saints, and the True Heart of Rock 'n' Roll. Verso Books. ISBN 0860913708.
- Masterton, James (2019). Chart Watch UK – Hits of 1989. James Masterton. ISBN 978-0-463-13857-1.
- Nettl, Bruno (1998). The Garland Encyclopedia of World Music: South Asia : the Indian subcontinent. Taylor & Francis. ISBN 0824049462.
- O'Brien, Lucy (1996). She Bop: The Definitive History of Women in Rock, Pop, and Soul. Penguin Books. ISBN 0140251553.
- Parish, James Robert (2009). Gloria Estefan. Facts On File. ISBN 978-1438111865.
- Pride, William M.; Ferrell, O. C. (2003). Marketing Concepts and Strategies. Houghton Mifflin Company. ISBN 0618192425.
- Poniatowska, Elena (1990). Todo México. Vol. 5. Editorial Diana. ISBN 9681331761.
- Rodden, John (2001). Performing the Literary Interview: How Writers Craft Their Public Selves. University of Nebraska Press. ISBN 0803239394.
- Rossides, Nicos (2020). Exploring Japanese Culture: Not Inscrutable After All. Troubador Publishing. ISBN 978-1838593346.
- Richardson, Elaine (2006). Hiphop Literacies. Routledge. ISBN 1134331622.
- Salzman, Marian; Matathia, Ira (2015). Next Now: Trends for the Future. St. Martin's Publishing Group. ISBN 978-1250086334.
- Samson, Jim (2013). Music in the Balkans. Brill. ISBN 978-9004250383.
- Shepherd, John; Horn, David; Laing, Dave; Oliver, Paul; Wicke, Peter (2003). Continuum Encyclopedia of Popular Music of the World, Volume 1: Media, Industry, Society. Vol. 1. A & C Black. ISBN 184714473X.
- Smith, Courtney E. (2011). Record collecting for girls: unleashing your inner music nerd, one album at a time. Houghton Mifflin Harcourt. ISBN 978-0547502236.
- Stein, Seymour; Murphy, Gareth (2018). Siren Song: My Life in Music. St. Martin's Publishing Group. ISBN 978-1250116857.
- Stratton, Allegra (2006). Muhajababes. Melbourne Univ. Publishing. ISBN 0522853250.
- Strong, Martin Charles; Griffin, Brendon (2008). Lights, camera, sound tracks. Canongate Books. ISBN 978-1847670038.
- Taylor, Timothy D. (2016). Music and Capitalism: A History of the Present. University of Chicago Press. ISBN 978-0226311975.
- Telgen, Diane; Kamp, Jim (1996). Latinas! Women of Achievement. Visible Ink Press. ISBN 0787608831.
- Thagard, Paul (2005). Language. MIT Press. ISBN 0-262-70109-X.
- The Diagram Group (2013). Encyclopedia of African Peoples. Routledge. ISBN 978-1135963347.
- Varma, Pavan K. (2005). Being Indian. Penguin Books. ISBN 0143033425.
- Weintraub, Andrew N.; Barendregt, Bart; Lau, Frederick (2017). Vamping the Stage: Female Voices of Asian Modernities. University of Hawaii Press. ISBN 978-0824874193.
- Weithz, Jesper (2020). 2020 (in Swedish). Ordfront. ISBN 978-9174415544.
- Yaqub, Nadia; Quawas, Rula (2017). Bad Girls of the Arab World. University of Texas Press. ISBN 978-1477313367.
