= Erganian =

Erganyan (Armenian: Երկանյան, Western Armenian Յակոբեան) is an Armenian surname

The surname may refer to:

- Leslie Erganian is an American artist and author.
- Sarkis Erganian (1870 - 1950) was an Ottoman Armenian painter.

== See also ==
Aram Yerganian
