= Jessica Tarlov =

American political strategist (born 1984)

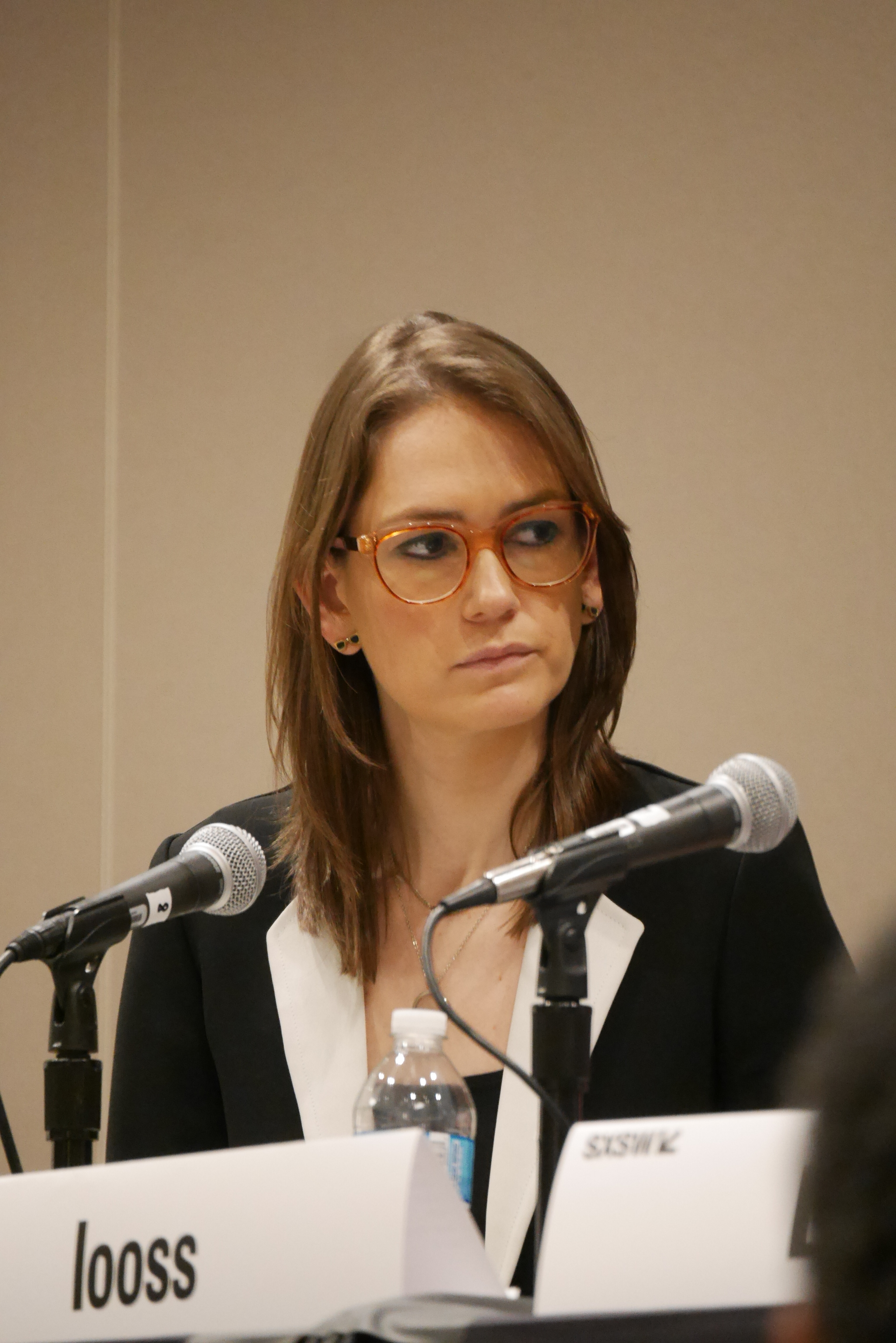
- Tarlov at South by Southwest, 2018
- Born: March 9, 1984 (age 42); New York City, U.S
- Education: Bryn Mawr College (BA); London School of Economics (MPP, MRes, PhD)
- Occupation: Television host
- Employer: Fox News
- Political party: Democratic
- Spouse: Brian McKenna (m. 2021)
- Children: 2
- Parents: Mark Tarlov (father); Judith Roberts (mother)
- Relatives: Molly Tarlov (sister)

Jessica Tarlov (born March 9, 1984) is an American political strategist for the Democratic Party who is a rotating co-host of The Five on Fox News.

== Background ==
Tarlov was raised in Tribeca, Manhattan, the daughter of Judith (née Roberts), a screenwriter, and Mark Tarlov, an attorney and film producer. She is of Jewish descent.

Tarlov attended the Dalton School and earned her B.A. degree in history from Bryn Mawr College. She then went on to study at the London School of Economics and Political Science and received a Master of Science degree in public policy and administration, a Master of Research degree in political science, and a Doctorate in political science and government. Her dissertation examines the degree to which scandals affected electoral outcomes for members of parliament.

== Career ==
Tarlov worked on Boris Johnson's 2008 London mayoral campaign.

Tarlov was Vice President of Research & Consumer Insights at the Bustle Digital Group until 2024.

In 2008, she served as research assistant for political analyst and regular Fox News contributor Douglas Schoen who encouraged the network to put her on the air. Tarlov made her first appearance on Fox News in 2014, becoming a frequent guest. She has appeared on shows such as Hannity, Your World with Neil Cavuto, The Five, Outnumbered, Fox & Friends, Kennedy, Watters World, and more. She officially was named contributor in 2017.

In January 2022, Tarlov was named co-host on The Five, where she serves as a rotating co-host along with Harold Ford Jr. On March 28, 2024, it was reported that Tony Bobulinski was filing suit against Tarlov for $30 million after comments she made on The Five regarding allegations that a Trump Super PAC was paying Bobulinski's legal bills, a claim he denied. Tarlov made an on-air correction the day after making the allegation, stating, "I have seen no indication those payments were made in connection with Mr. Bobulinski's legal fees and he denies that they were."

In October 2024, Tarlov told The New York Times that her goals at Fox News include presenting to its viewers "a reasonable and data-driven representative of the left," while also demonstrating to the majority of American people, "[except for] MAGA die-hards", that "ideological foes can get along".

== Personal life ==
Tarlov's mother, Judith Roberts, wrote the screenplay for the 1999 rom-com Simply Irresistible, and her father, Mark Tarlov, directed the film. He was an attorney and movie producer, who died from cancer in 2021.

During the COVID-19 pandemic, Tarlov began dating her next-door neighbor, hedge-fund executive Brian McKenna. She announced her engagement to McKenna on the Kennedy program on the Fox Business Network in April 2021. The two married weeks later, and Tarlov gave birth to her daughter Cleo in December 2021. On January 10, 2024, she announced on Fox News' The Five that she was expecting her second child, a girl, in April. On April 15, 2024, Tarlov's second daughter, Teddy, was born.

== Books ==
- Tarlov, Jessica (2026). I Disagree: Winning Arguments Without Losing Friends (First hardcover ed.). New York: Random House. ISBN 9798217154135. OCLC 1613015884.
