= G.B.F. (film) =

2013 American teen comedy film

- Theatrical release poster
- Directed by: Darren Stein
- Written by: George Northy
- Produced by: Stephen Israel; Richard Bever; Darren Stein; George Northy
- Starring: Michael J. Willett; Paul Iacono; Sasha Pieterse; Andrea Bowen; Xosha Roquemore; Molly Tarlov; Evanna Lynch; Joanna "JoJo" Levesque; Natasha Lyonne; Rebecca Gayheart; Jonathan Silverman; Horatio Sanz; Megan Mullally
- Cinematography: Jonathan Hall
- Edited by: Phillip J. Bartell
- Music by: Brian H. Kim
- Production companies: Logolite Entertainment; Parting Shots Media; School Pictures
- Distributed by: Vertical Entertainment
- Release dates: April 19, 2013 (Tribeca); January 17, 2014 (United States)
- Running time: 94 minutes
- Country: United States
- Language: English
- Budget: $3.2 million

G.B.F. (Gay Best Friend) is a 2013 American teen comedy film directed by Darren Stein and produced by School Pictures, Parting Shots Media, and Logolite Entertainment. The film had its first official screening at the 2013 Tribeca Film Festival in April 2013 and was released theatrically on January 17, 2014, by Vertical Entertainment. G.B.F. focuses on closeted gay high school students Tanner and Brent. When Tanner is outed, he is picked up by the cool girls. He begins to surpass still-closeted Brent in popularity.

The film stars Michael J. Willett, Paul Iacono, Sasha Pieterse, Andrea Bowen, Xosha Roquemore, Molly Tarlov, Evanna Lynch, Joanna "JoJo" Levesque, and Megan Mullally. G.B.F's soundtrack includes new compositions by "Hi Fashion" and "Veva".

== Plot ==
Tanner Daniels and Brent Van Camp are two closeted teenage high school students. The three most popular girls in the school, Fawcett Brooks, Caprice Winters, and 'Shley Osgood, are in charge of the three feuding cliques that rule North Gateway High in suburban California. Fawcett Brooks rules over the wealthy and fashionable, Caprice Winters rules over drama, choir, and the minority students, and 'Shley Osgood rules over the conservative and religious Christian students, specifically Mormons. Brent hatches a plan to out himself at prom, which will make him the most popular boy at school since the latest trend, according to teen girl magazines, is a GBF – a gay best friend.

Meanwhile, Soledad Braunstein is told by teacher Ms. Hoegel that their Gay-Straight Alliance (GSA) cannot exist if there is no gay student in the club. Fawcett helps Soledad track down any potential gay students in the school by downloading a hook-up app for gay men. Brent previously persuaded Tanner to download the app on his phone. Soledad and her friends track Tanner down, forcing him to come out in front of the whole school. This attracts the attention of Fawcett, 'Shley, and Caprice, who all believe having a GBF will secure their bid for prom queen.

Angry, Tanner confronts Brent for not coming out as well, and in revenge, harshly outs Brent in front of his overbearing mother Mrs. van Camp. Tanner quickly regrets it, but Brent is no longer speaking to him. Tanner reluctantly agrees to be friends with Fawcett, Caprice, and 'Shley, as the three girls protect him from homophobic bullying led by Fawcett's ex-boyfriend Hamilton. However, the girls express their disappointment that Tanner is not like the stereotypical gay men they have seen on television and make him over to their liking. Brent is annoyed at all the attention Tanner is getting, especially since Tanner has become nominated for Prom King. Likewise, 'Shley's conservative best friend McKenzie Pryce tries to persuade 'Shley that homosexuality is sinful.

At a party, Caprice sets Tanner up with Christian, a gay friend of hers, who is willing to be his prom date. However, McKenzie refuses to allow Tanner to buy a couple's prom ticket, insisting they are exclusive to heterosexual couples. Tanner agrees to join Soledad's GSA since she is the only one willing to help him fight the school policy. Tanner chastises Fawcett, 'Shley, and Caprice for only caring about him when it benefits them. Chagrined, Fawcett also joins the GSA, but Ms. Hoegel quickly sees that Tanner is being used by the girls as a prize. Fawcett offers to hold an alternative prom, which pleases Tanner but enrages Caprice who is annoyed that Tanner is endorsing Fawcett. Brent, believing that he is Tanner's prom date, is disappointed to learn that Tanner is going with Christian. He teams up with Caprice who plans on being queen of the school-endorsed prom and offers to be her prom king. Tanner and Brent's old friends, Sophie and Glenn, confront them and reveal how they are being used. Tanner asks Fawcett if this is true. Fawcett admits that she was, but she now does consider him a real friend. She also tells Tanner she created the second prom to win since most of the school dislikes her. Tanner agrees to help her win prom queen after hearing this.

Brent manages the publicity department for the school-sanctioned prom and uses explicitly anti-gay posters. The principal cancels the school prom due to the ensuing public backlash and supports the alternative prom. Tanner and Fawcett win prom king and queen. Tanner makes a speech at the dance, saying that he is tired of being seen as an object or a symbol. He apologizes to his true friends for dumping them. Tanner dances with Brent and they make up. They decide to stay friends, instead of being romantically involved and risking an already strong friendship.

== Cast ==
- Michael J. Willett as Tanner Daniels, a comic book geek who is the first "out of the closet gay" at his school.
- Paul Iacono as Brent Van Camp, Tanner's best friend who is very feminine and sassy
- Sasha Pieterse as Fawcett Brooks, a rich and popular girl who is the hottest girl in school and rules over the wealthy in-crowd
- Andrea Bowen as 'Shley Osgood, a sweet-natured, open-minded Mormon queen bee who rules the school's conservative and religious students
- Xosha Roquemore as Caprice Winters, a talented, charismatic, and popular African American girl gifted in the performing arts who is in charge of the high school's singers, drama students and ethnic minorities
- Molly Tarlov as Sophie Aster
- Evanna Lynch as McKenzie Pryce, a mean-spirited, Christian extremist, who believes the LGBT community is evil
- Derek Mio as Glenn Cho
- Mia Rose Frampton as Mindie
- Joanna "JoJo" Levesque as Soledad Braunstein, president of the school's Gay-Straight Alliance
- Taylor Frey as Topher, Shley's closeted gay Mormon boyfriend
- Brock Harris as Hamilton
- Anthony Garland as Christian
- Megan Mullally as Mrs. Van Camp
- Natasha Lyonne as Ms. Hoegel
- Rebecca Gayheart as Mrs. Daniels
- Jonathan Silverman as Mr. Daniels
- Horatio Sanz as Principal Crowe

== Production ==
=== Development ===
George Northy was working at an ad agency and chipping away at a screenplay, G.B.F., about a school with a new trend: All the girls need to have this season's hottest accessory of a gay best friend. Northy searched the Internet for LGBT screenwriting competitions and turned up listings for Outfest's Screenwriting Lab and NewFest's NewDraft Screenplay Contest. By the time both festivals came around last summer, Northy was a finalist for both. Guinevere Turner, with the Outfest Lab, sent the script for G.B.F. to Darren Stein. Stein told Indiewire, "I thought, since it came from Guinevere, that it would be a dark script. I read it and I was laughing out loud. It felt like a classic teen movie. It jumped off the page in a way that most screenplays don't. It was so snarky and smart, about something close to my heart and culturally relevant. It wasn't message-y or preachy. I was very, very excited. It's very rare to laugh out loud reading a script."

After reading the script, Stein decided to direct the film and passed it on to his manager who got investors involved with the project. Raven-Symoné was in talks to star in the film following the table read however eventually passed on the project.

=== Filming ===
Principal photography took place in Los Angeles over 18 days.

=== Rating ===
The film received an R rating from the MPAA for "sexual references". Director Stein responded to the rating by saying, "I always thought of G.B.F. as a PG-13 movie, but we were given an R 'For Sexual References' while not having a single F-bomb, hint of nudity or violence in the film. Perhaps the ratings box should more accurately read 'For Homosexual References' or 'Too Many Scenes of Gay Teens Kissing.' I look forward to a world where queer teens can express their humor and desire in a sweet, fun teen film that doesn't get tagged with a cautionary R."

== Release ==
G.B.F. had its official Hollywood premiere at Chinese 6 Theater in Los Angeles, California on November 19, 2013. Prior to its theatrical release, the film was screened at many film festivals.

=== Critical reception ===
The film has a score of 80% on the review-aggregate website Rotten Tomatoes based on 41 reviews, with an average rating of 6.39/10. The site's consensus reads, "G.B.F. explores high school relationship dynamics and teen stereotypes with a refreshingly humorous touch - and surprisingly subtle smarts".

On Metacritic, the film has a 56 out of 100 rating based on 14 critics, indicating "mixed or average" reviews.

== Home media ==
The film was released on DVD on February 11, 2014, in the US.

== Soundtrack ==
Gay Best Friend (Original Motion Picture Soundtrack)

Soundtrack album by Various artists
- Released: January 14, 2014
- Recorded: 2013
- Genres: Pop, EDM
- Length: 54:09
- Label: Lakeshore Records

The soundtrack was released by Lakeshore Records to all digital retailers on January 14, 2014. The thirteen-track album was originally scheduled to include new compositions by JoJo, Michael J. Willett, Hi Fashion, and Veva. However, after the track listing had been announced, both JoJo and Willett were not included on the final cut for unknown reasons.

No.	Title	Music	Length
1.	"Our Summer"	Dragonette	4:20
2.	"H.E.R."	Veva/Matthew Paul	4:13
3.	"Body Work"	Morgan Page, Tegan and Sara	3:59
4.	"Go!" (Club Mix)	Tones on Tail	4:26
5.	"Friday Nights" (Jesse Andrews Remix)	French Horn Rebellion, Viceroy	5:30
6.	"Hey Daydreamer"	Neil Halstead	3:22
7.	"Alala"	CSS	3:58
8.	"Too Hot"	Hey Willpower	3:38
9.	"Wild"	Royal Teeth	4:33
10.	"Lighthouse"	Hi Fashion	5:45
11.	"Closer"	Tegan and Sara	3:29
12.	"Gay Best Friend"	Heven' Helen Vergara	2:42
13.	"True"	Glacial Walls	4:14
Total length:			54:09
