= Hohodza =

UK-based Zimbabwean band

Portia Gwanzura & Hohodza Band is a UK based Zimbabwean band formed in 1992. One of its main aims is to promote Zimbabwean culture.

== History ==
=== Formation ===
The band members were mainly self-taught, drawing heavily on their traditional musical and dancing roots. Their first show was in 1992 in Harare.

=== (1997-2001) ===
Release 7 more albums (including Dzorai Moyo, Hupenyu, and Zvinoda Kushinga)

== Bandmembers ==
- Portia P. Gwanzura and Simbarashe "Simba" Mudzingwa – lead vocals
- various other musicians and dancers.

== Tours ==
=== UK ===
- Ashbourne Festival 2005.
- Manchester 2002 Commonwealth Games 2002.
