= Tarlow (surname) =

Tarlow is a surname. Notable people with the surname include:

- Karen Tarlow, American composer and music teacher
- Peter Tarlow (born 1946), American rabbi
- Rose Tarlow, American interior designer
- Sara Alpern-Tarlow or Sara Alpern, Professor of United States history
- Sarah Tarlow, British archaeologist

== See also ==
- Tarłów
- Tarloff
- Tarlov
