= Leslie Erganian =

American artist and author

- Born: Chicago, Illinois
- Education: University of Illinois, Urbana-Champaign
- Alma mater: UCLA School of Theater, Film and Television (MFA 1993)
- Occupations: Artist and Author
- Notable work: New West: Innovating at the Intersection (book)
- Spouses: Wolfgang Wagener, AIA, RIBA
- Relatives: David McHattie Forbes (Maternal Great grandfather Lougher Pedigree); Sarkis Erganian (first-cousin twice removed)

Leslie Erganian is an American artist and author. Her work as an artist includes photography, collage, assemblage, and animation. She is the co-author of the book NEW WEST: Innovating at the Intersection.

== Life ==
Leslie Erganian was born in Oak Park, Illinois, attended William Fremd High School, and began her undergraduate studies as a pre-med biology student at the University of Illinois, Urbana-Champaign. In her sophomore year, she transferred to the University of California, Riverside where she found her calling in the arts, studying photography under Joe Deal and art history under Dr. Richard Carrott. She received a BA with a dual major in fine art and art history. She returned to Illinois to obtain a MFA in photography under Jerry Savage and Barbara Degenevieve, and thereafter found representation by the Phyllis Needleman Gallery in Chicago where she exhibited a series of hand painted photographic self-portraits exploring fairy tale mythology.

Her maternal ancestry includes her Great Grandfather David McHattie Forbes, a foreman Forrester in Scotland and Hawai’i, and her Welsh maternal Great Grandmother, Catherine Lougher Forbes.

She returned to California on a graduate fellowship to obtain a second MFA from the UCLA Film School and representation by the Marilyn Pink Gallery in Los Angeles.

In 1994, Erganian first appeared on film in Radio Inside starring Elisabeth Shue, a film that she also art directed. Additional project contributions were for clients including Warner Bros., MGM, DreamWorks, NBC, MTV and PBS. These include Babylon 5, Speechless, and Looney Tunes for Warner Bros. Animation.

In 1996, she established her own label, Lost Continents, creating fine and functional art and interiors for clients in the entertainment industry as well as for select stores throughout Los Angeles.

In 1998, she began appearing regularly on television as a creative consiglieri. Her first guest appearance on Discovery Channel's The Christopher Lowell Show led to regular contributions to the show. In 2000, she appeared on NBC's The Rosie O'Donnell Show, and in 2002 she became a regular correspondent for the Hallmark Channel weekday morning show New Morning, appearing in 31 episodes over five seasons in a series entitled "Soul of a House.”

In 2008, she established the website Leslieness as a platform for increasing art access and visual awareness through writings & photography about art, life, and beauty. In the same year, she was a participating artist in "Department Store: A Collaboration with J. Morgan Puett", the inaugural exhibit of the Sullivan Center at the School of the Art Institute of Chicago.

Erganian taught classes in film design at UCLA and photography at the University of Illinois, earning two awards for outstanding teaching.

She has lent her voice to advancing verbal and visual literacy as a performer through SAG Foundation in Los Angeles, and for the Deaf Media Arts Council in conjunction with the U.S. Department of Education. She has become increasingly engaged with museum education through a series of ongoing programs with the Metropolitan Museum of Art, believing that the role American museums play in the advancement of art education to learners of all ages is a vital national resource for the 21st century.

She contributed to the architectural monograph Raphael Soriano, published by Phaidon Press.

In 2019, she co-authored the book NEW WEST: Innovating at the Intersection with Wolfgang Wagener, which was published by Hirmer Publishers in October, and which in 2020, earned five gold design awards from PubWest for best book design.

Erganian is a member of SAG-AFTRA, and lifetime member of the Society of Architectural Historians.
