= RadiumOne =

- Type: Private
- Industry: Online Advertising
- Founded: September 2009
- Headquarters: San Francisco, California, US
- Area served: International
- Key people: Gurbaksh Chahal (Founder); Bill Lonergan (CEO)
- Products: RadiumOne Sharing Analytics; RadiumOne Mobile Analytics; RadiumOne Smart Links
- Services: RTB online advertising Mobile Analytics; Social Analytics
- Website: www.radiumone.io

RadiumOne is a marketing company that provides online display, mobile, video, and social advertising services through programmatic marketing campaigns. It was first launched in 2009 by Gurbaksh Chahal.

== Overview ==
The company buys advertising space from websites and mobile applications and resells it in targeted packages to advertisers and agencies. It also creates software that automates the process of media buying for digital marketers. Headquartered in San Francisco, the firm has offices across North America, Europe and Asia.

== History ==
The company was launched in 2009 by Gurbaksh Chahal as gWallet, a loyalty and rewards program. After CEO Gurbaksh Chahal pleaded guilty to domestic violence battery on April 23, 2014, there were calls for him to step down as CEO. He was fired and immediately replaced by COO Bill Lonergan on April 27, 2014.

RadiumOne utilizes data taken from social networking sites such as Twitter and Facebook and uses it to tailor online, video, social and mobile consumer advertising using real-time bidding. The startup had initially raised $33.5 million from venture capital funds.

In June 2017, RhythmOne acquired the assets of data-driven marketing platform RadiumOne for US$22m.
