= Gurbaksh Chahal =

American businessman

Gurbaksh Singh Chahal
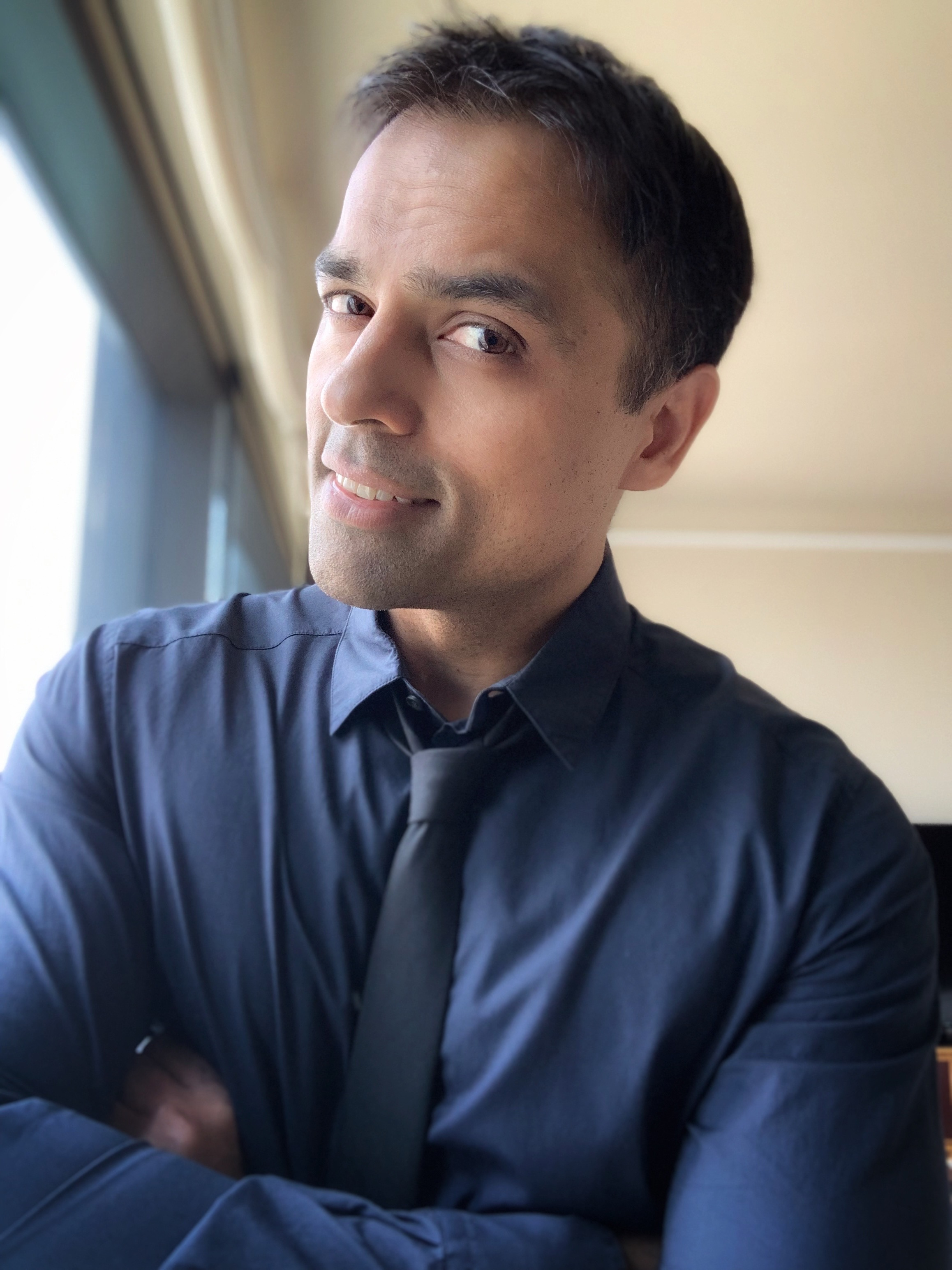
- Chahal in 2019
- Born: July 17, 1982 (age 44); Tarn Taran Sahib, Punjab, India
- Occupation: Entrepreneur
- Years active: 1998–present
- Known for: Founder of ClickAgents, BlueLithium, RadiumOne, Gravity4, Taara Labs, RedLotus, and VendorCloud
- Political party: Democratic Party
- Spouse: Rubina Bajwa (m. 2022)
- Parents: Avtar Singh (father); Arjinder Chahal (mother)
- Website: GurbakshChahal.com

Gurbaksh Singh Chahal (born July 17, 1982) is an Indian-American entrepreneur who has founded, managed, and frequently sold several internet advertising companies.

Chahal founded his first advertising network at the age of 16 and two years later became a millionaire after selling it to ValueClick for nearly $40 million. In 2004, he co-founded BlueLithium, which went on to become the fifth-largest internet advertising network in the United States before being sold to Yahoo in a $300 million deal. Chahal has since founded other internet-based companies including RadiumOne, Gravity4, and BNN Breaking. He is currently the CEO of VendorCloud and RedLotus.

In 2010, Bloomberg Businessweek named him to its list of the 15 best young entrepreneurs of the year. In April 2011, Men's Health called him one of "The World’s Richest and Fittest Guys", reporting his net worth to be $150 million. The next year, Chahal was listed among the 25 richest entrepreneurs under the age of 30 by Complex magazine, and in 2013 he was one of Ernst and Young's entrepreneurs of the year.

Also in 2013, Chahal went to trial on charges of domestic violence and battery; although he pleaded not guilty, he was convicted and sentenced to probation. He was fired as CEO of RadiumOne by the board of directors. In 2016, after he was charged with domestic violence against a second woman, his probation was revoked. He resigned as CEO of Gravity4 and served six months in jail.

== Early life ==
Chahal was born on July 17, 1982, in Tarn Taran Sahib, a city near Amritsar in India's Punjab state, in a Sikh family. He was the youngest of four children. His father, Avtar Singh, was a police officer and mother, Arjinder Chahal, was a nurse in Tarn Taran Sahib. In 1985, during the aftermath of the Khalistani insurgency, Chahal's parents emigrated to the United States, his father having won a green card lottery. Chahal was raised by his grandmother for a short time. He emigrated the following year, at age four. The family lived in a one-bedroom apartment in San Jose, California. His father took a job with the Postal Service and his mother worked as an nurse's assistant. He has two elder sisters — Nirmal and Kamal, and an elder brother Taj Chahal; the latter two had worked with Chahal in his ventures. His family were devout followers of Sikhism and Chahal and his brother used to wear a turban, a type of headwear based on cloth winding. He has said that he was the subject of intense racial bullying from the age of 5 in the local elementary school. At the age of 10, he was forced to remove his turban, at knife-point.

Chahal was an average student during schooling, earning B and C grades in his studies. To support his family, he bought second hand printers from the local market for $50 and resold printers on eBay for $200 at the age of 15. Chahal bought the Dell.net and HP.net domain names in 1997 and sent a letter to the companies offering to sell the names back to them for ten thousand dollars. He started receiving cease-and-desist letters and had to give the domains back. All of his family members had to work double shifts after his father incurred losses in stock market trading.

== Education ==
Although his parents hoped he would become a doctor, 16-year-old Chahal dropped out of Independence High School in 1998 to pursue a career in internet advertising. While still in high school, he had taken college-level computer courses on the campus of what is now Evergreen Valley College. After leaving high school, Chahal launched a digital advertising company called ClickAgents, which as recently as 2008 he asserted was the riskiest decision he has ever made.

== Career ==
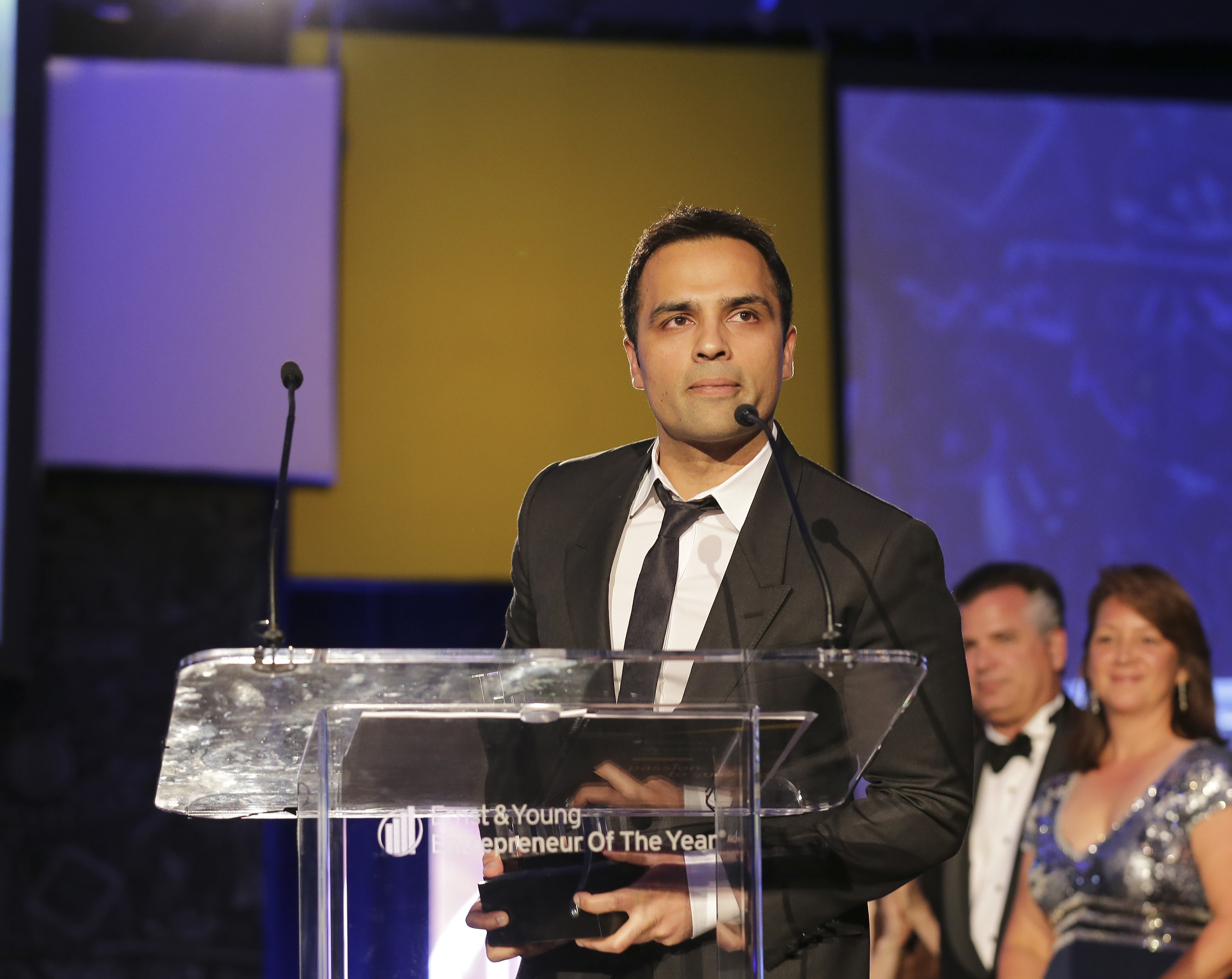
Gurbaksh Chahal accepting the E&Y Entrepreneur of the Year Award for RadiumOne, 2013

Chahal started his career buying and reselling printers on eBay, after being turned away from a job at McDonald's. His initial forays into the business world were to support his family and largely derived from his father's interests in stock trading.

=== ClickAgents ===
In 1998, at the age of 16, Chahal founded ClickAgents, which was among the first pay-per-click networks. It started as an advertising network focused on performance-based advertising, on the lines of DoubleClick. By 2000, it had numerous customers and had 34 employees. It was acquired by ValueClick in November 2000 in an all-stock deal valued at nearly $40 million, which made Chahal an overnight millionaire.

=== BlueLithium and MingleNow ===
In 2004, Chahal founded BlueLithium, a company that specialized in behavioral targeting, a technique whereby web users' online habits are tracked in order to show customized ads. The ad-tech industry praised it with Business 2.0 listing it among the 11 most disruptive innovations of 2006, and by the same year, it had expanded operations to other countries, having purchased AdRevolver. The same year, the company again received the title of Top Innovator of the Year for 2006.

MingleNow, a social network was simultaneously launched, which was accorded a partnership deal by Anheuser-Busch. It was named among the top 100 private companies of America by AlwaysOn for three consecutive years and in 2007, Yahoo! bought it for $300 million in cash; Chahal remained CEO during interim period. It was the fifth largest ad-network in the United States and the second largest in the UK at the time of sale.

=== GWallet to RadiumOne ===
In 2009, Chahal launched gWallet, a venture that partnered with brand and game developers to bring users virtual currency offers. The startup worked directly with brands instead of using any kind of affiliate model. It used branded video campaigns to engage with consumers. Disney, Best Buy, K-Mart, Nestle, and The History Channel used their video campaigns on the social network. The startup's research showed that only 2-4% of users chose to pause a video game and opt to explore brand engagement and any offers like earning a virtual currency. This meant that the current method of advertisement and engagement by most games was not very effective and lacked the required engagement from its users. gWallet instead introduced its own concept of a brand bar which was supposed to be an ingame concept. The brand bar would act as a top menu bar on the game play screen which would allow the users to view advertisements while playing a game, or access options to earn virtual currency while playing the game. With this model, in its contrast to existing separate menus for such engagements, gWallet eventually raised $10 million in funding.

In 2010, Chahal founded RadiumOne, another online ad company of a slightly different genre, which started as a loyalty and rewards program but later migrated to the targeted-advertising domain, having acquired multiple social-media-centered startups. It garnered reputation for its patented ad-technology with Chahal being poised to be a billionaire, and was valued at about US$500 million at its peak. In 2017 it was purchased by RhythmOne, a public company on the London Stock exchange, for US$22 million.

Chahal was nominated and awarded the E&Y Entrepreneur of the Year Award for RadiumOne in 2013.

=== Gravity4 ===
In July 2014, Chahal launched Gravity4 (since renamed to DaVinci Marketing Cloud). The company attempted but failed bid to buy back RadiumOne and closed in 2017. Gravity4's main area of business was gathering customer data regarding user experiences to allow marketers to improve their ad targets.

In 2015, an employee of Gravity4 sued Chahal, claiming that Gravity4 never paid him and that he was the subject of abuse and harassment by Chahal.

=== TaaraLabs and RedLotus ===
In 2019, Chahal founded TaaraLabs, an incubator helping build companies to address problems in the fields of artificial intelligence, IoT, and data sciences. The lab is connected to over 7 billion IoT devices globally. In the same year, he founded RedLotus in Hong Kong, which specializes in AI-based targeted advertising. This service was provided mainly in the form of customer engagement through this AI platform. This company went in for its initial funding of $50 million, intending to use this initial capital for R&D and expansion worldwide.

=== ProcureNet ===
In 2020, Chahal founded ProcureNet and is its CEO. It is a supplier of pharmaceutical materials and vaccines consumables and a subsidiary of VendorCloud.

=== Chahal Foundation ===
Chahal has been the Chairman of the Chahal Foundation since August 2012. The Foundation supports the families of hate crime victims, educational scholarship, combat child trafficking in India, and helps in disaster relief efforts in India.

=== BNN Breaking and Trimfeed ===
In 2022, Chahal founded the now-defunct news website and aggregator BNN Breaking in Hong Kong. The website was subject to several controversies regarding the accuracy of its reporting, and all of its accounts were suspended from Twitter in June 2022 for violations of the site's policy on spam and platform manipulation. As of March 2024, Google appeared to no longer show search results for the website. The BNN website was deleted and moved to the website TrimFeed. Trimfeed was temporarily closed after The New York Times informed Chahal they were doing a report on BNN.

== Honors and philanthropy ==
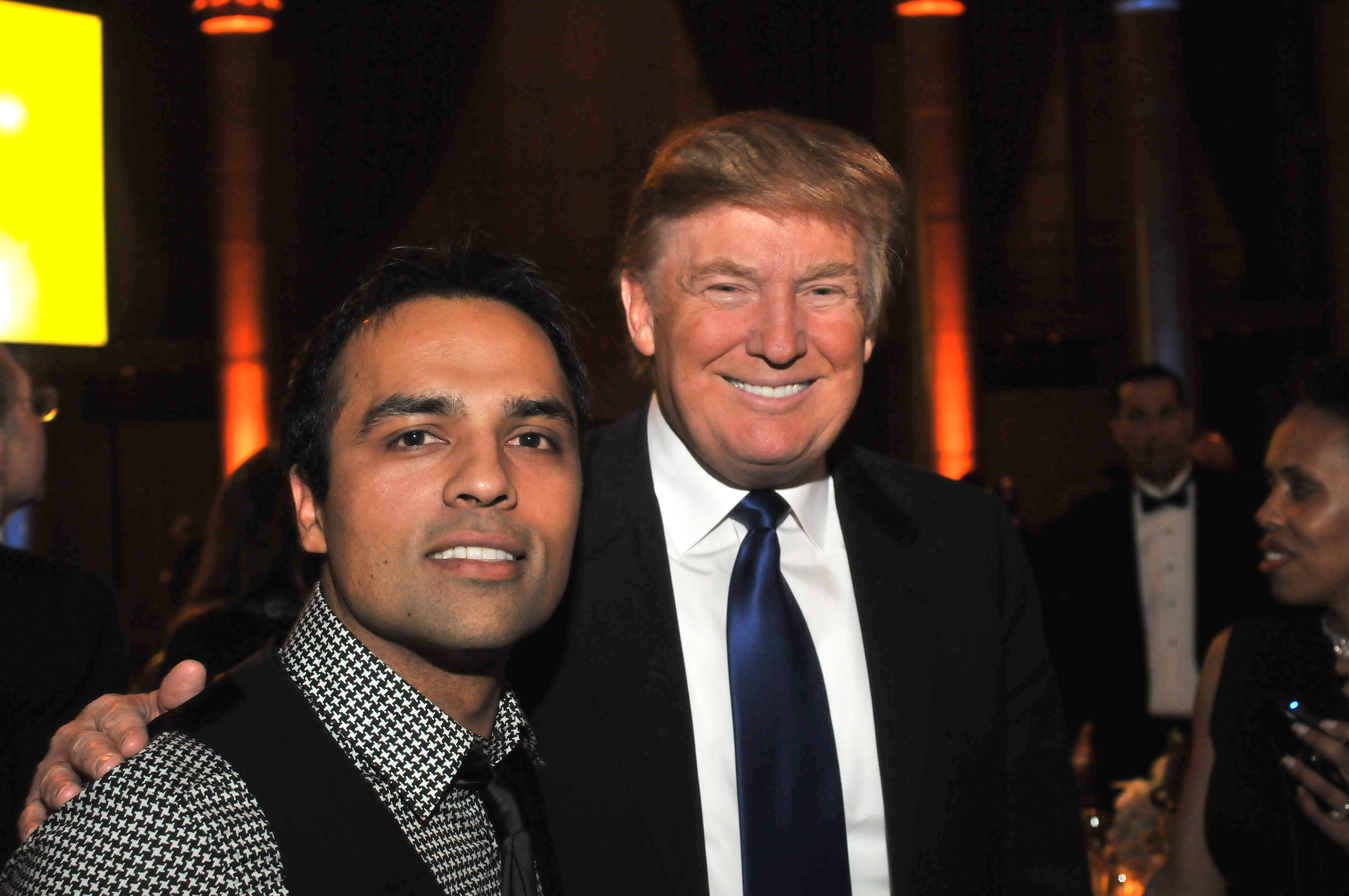
Chahal with Donald Trump at the 2009 Leaders in Management Award function, Pace University

In 2010, Bloomberg Businessweek named Chahal among the 15 best young entrepreneurs of the year.

In the same year, Chahal's alma mater Evergreen Valley College awarded him an honorary degree in Business Administration, and Pace University conferred the Leaders in Management Award and an Honorary Doctorate in Commercial Sciences; he had earlier established an endowed entrepreneurial scholarship program at the university.

Business Insider included him in their "30 under 30 to watch" list in 2011. In 2012, Complex magazine named him in a list of the 25 richest entrepreneurs under the age of 30. In the same year, he received the Light of India Amrapali Young Achievers award. In 2013, he was named as one of the Ernst and Young entrepreneurs of the year and was awarded the Technology Entrepreneur of the Decade at Anokhi's Prestige Awards 2013.

The following year, Complex noted him among the top 10 technology entrepreneurs of the year. He was recognized as an "Entrepreneur Extraordinaire" in January 2014 by Darpan Magazine. In 2019, Delhi Sikh Gurdwara Management Committee honored him for contributions made to the field of entrepreneurship.

In 2012, after the Wisconsin Sikh temple shooting, he committed US$1 million to found BeProud (since renamed to Chahal Foundation), a charitable foundation that supports the families of hate crime victims and combats child trafficking in India. It had liaised with the Church of Jesus Christ of Latter-day Saints to provide employment scopes for rural women in Maharashtra, India.

In 2020, Chahal donated face masks, test kits, personal protective equipment and ventilators to hospitals across several countries (including Hong Kong and India) during the Coronavirus pandemic, and extended procurement networks to help governments in mitigating the supply-chain chaos.

== Personal life ==
Chahal once resided in San Francisco Bay Area but is as of 2019 based in Hong Kong.

Chahal has attracted attention for his physique and extravagant lifestyle, including a fleet of luxurious cars and a penthouse apartment. He was featured in The Secret Millionaire, where he went undercover in San Francisco and gave away $110,000 of his wealth. In 2011, Men's Health awarded him the seventh spot in the list of the world's fittest and richest men.

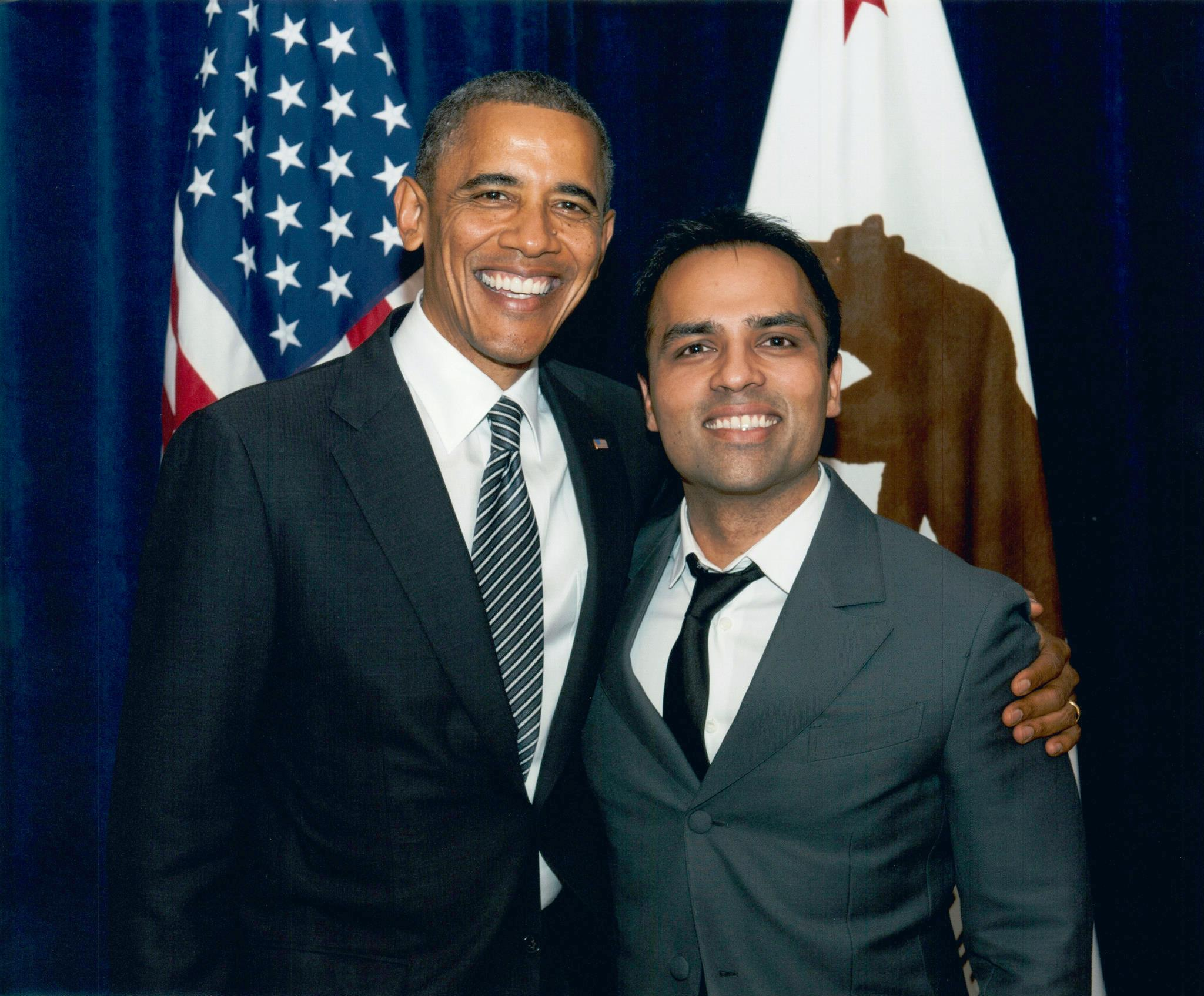
Chahal with Barack Obama at a Fundraising Dinner in San Francisco, 2012

Chahal professed to be a devout Sikh, and was largely inspired by his grandmother.

Chahal was a regular donor to Democratic Party candidates; he was twice invited to the White House during Barack Obama's presidency.

He is also a motivational speaker, advocates one-dollar salary for CEOs, and has written an autobiography called The Dream.

In 2019, Chahal started a relationship with Punjabi film actress Rubina Bajwa. On October 23, 2021, Chahal and Bajwa became engaged in San Francisco and on 26 October 2022, they got married with a private ceremony in Mexico.

=== Domestic violence and battery conviction ===
Chahal was arrested in 2013 and charged with 45 felonies following an attack on his then-girlfriend. Video footage of the assault, taken by a camera in Chahal's bedroom ceiling, showed Chahal smothering the woman with a pillow and hitting and kicking her 117 times over a half hour period.

In August 2013, the San Francisco District Attorney's Office (SFDA) charged Chahal with committing acts of domestic violence against his girlfriend. The video of the incident was ruled inadmissible in the case as there had been no warrant for its seizure. Chahal proclaimed his innocence but nevertheless entered into a no contest plea to one charge of domestic violence battery and one charge of battery. He was sentenced to three years' probation, ordered to pay a fine, and compelled to undergo a 52-week domestic violence training course along with 25 hours of community service. Subsequently, he was fired from his position as CEO of RadiumOne (Chahal alleged that his guilty plea was coerced by the board of RadiumOne).

In 2016, after he committed acts of domestic violence against a second woman, the San Francisco County Superior Court found Chahal guilty of violating the terms of his September 2014 probation. The court sentenced him to one year in jail; he resigned from his position as CEO of Gravity4. The California Courts of Appeal upheld the verdict in April 2018 and Chahal served six months in San Francisco County Jail.

== Publications ==
- The Dream: How I Learned the Risks and Rewards of Entrepreneurship and Made Millions, Palgrave Macmillan (October 23, 2008) ISBN 0-230-61095-1
