= Molly Tarlov =

American actress (born 1986)

- Born: September 12, 1986 (age 40); Manhattan, New York, U.S.
- Occupation: Actress
- Years active: 1999–present
- Known for: Awkward
- Spouse: Alexander Noyes (m. 2017)
- Children: 1
- Parents: Mark Tarlov (father); Judith Roberts (mother)
- Relatives: Jessica Tarlov (sister)

Molly Tarlov (born September 12, 1986) is an American actress. She played the role of Sadie Saxton on MTV's TV series Awkward.

== Early life ==
Tarlov was born and raised in Manhattan, in New York City, to film producer, attorney and wine maker Mark Tarlov and mother Judy Roberts. She is the younger of two daughters. On her mother's side, both of her grandparents were Jewish immigrants, her grandfather from Russia, and her grandmother escaping Europe on the last boat from France prior to World War II.

As a child, Tarlov appeared in the musical Bye Bye Birdie at the Little Red School House. She attended the arts camp, Interlochen Center for the Arts and a NYU summer program in Paris. Tarlov graduated from Bennington College with a B.A. in Theatre Arts in 2008.

After college, Tarlov attended the Atlantic Theater Company and LAByrinth Theater Company, where she wrote as well as acted in the LAByrinth Master Class.

== Career ==
=== Television ===
Tarlov's television debut was a bit part on iCarly in 2009. In 2010, she appeared in the role of Caitlin on the ABC Family series Huge, which was written and created by My So-Called Life's Winnie Holzman and her daughter Savannah Dooley.

Tarlov's breakthrough role was as mean girl Sadie Saxton in the MTV original series, Awkward, which debuted in 2011. Tarlov's character was notable for her intense dislike of the main character, Jenna, played by Ashley Rickards, and for her complex struggles with weight and her own neuroses and insecurities. Sadie was also noteworthy for nasty putdowns that were followed by her signature, "You're Welcome!" on topics from bulimia, being gay, and appropriate behavior. The character inspired Twitter feeds and GIFs.

=== Film ===
In 1999, Tarlov had a role in the feature film, Simply Irresistible, which was directed by her father.

In 2014, Tarlov starred in the movie G.B.F., a teen comedy written by George Northy and directed by Darren Stein (Jawbreaker).

=== Other work ===
In August 2012, Tarlov recorded an It Gets Better Project video clip.

In May 2015, Tarlov, along with her co-stars from Awkward and other MTV shows did a stylized promo for the Scream where they were all shown bloodied and killed. Tarlov was skewered by a fire poker against a wall behind Katie Stevens from Faking It.

In July 2015, Tarlov co-starred in Eden xo's music video for the single "The Weekend." The video also featured Bonnie McKee and Ricky Dillon.

== Personal life ==
On June 23, 2015, Tarlov revealed that she was engaged to trailer editor and former drummer Alexander Noyes, who was in the bands Honor Society and Jonas Brothers. They were married on March 4, 2017. Tarlov and Noyes welcomed their first son in August, 2020.

Tarlov's sister, Jessica Tarlov, is a Democratic strategist who is a political commentator and is also a rotating co-host of The Five.

== Filmography ==
=== Film ===
Year	Title	Role	Notes
1999	Simply Irresistible	Molly	
2013	G.B.F.	Sophie	
2014	Era Apocrypha		Short film
2016	Everlasting	Liz	
2018	Haunting on Fraternity Row	Maggie	

=== Television ===
Year	Title	Role	Notes
2009	iCarly	Lisa	Episode: "iThink They Kissed"
2010	Gravity	Customer	Episode: "Suicide Dummies"
2010	Huge	Caitlin	Episode: "Hello, I Must Be Going"
2011–2016	Awkward	Sadie Saxton	Main role, 87 episodes
2015	Scream	Sadie Saxton	The promotional campaigns of Season 1 of the series
2017	Nasty Habits	Misty	Episode: "Misty, It's Friday Night"
2017	No, That's Okay. I'm Good.	Molly	Episode: "Molly Tarlov & Matthew Scott Montgomery"
2018	On Hiatus with Monty Geer	Dolly	Episode: "The Hook... Up"

=== Music videos ===
Year	Title	Artist	Notes
2015	"The Weekend"	Eden xo	
2024	"Forever 21"	Bonnie McKee	
