= Radio Inside =

- Directed by: Jeffrey Bell
- Written by: Jeffrey Bell
- Produced by: Joseph M. Caracciolo Jr. John Fiedler; Mark Tarlov
- Starring: William McNamara; Elisabeth Shue; Dylan Walsh
- Cinematography: Brian Capener
- Edited by: Jim Clark
- Music by: Gil Goldstein
- Production company: Polar Entertainment Capitol Films
- Distributed by: Metro-Goldwyn-Mayer
- Release date: March 15, 1994
- Running time: 91 minutes
- Country: United States
- Language: English

Radio Inside is a 1994 American drama film, written and directed by Jeffrey Bell.

== Plot ==
Having graduated from college, Matthew Anderson travels to Florida to spend some time with his older brother while deciding what career to pursue. He is not motivated by money or desire for worldly success; he spends a great deal of time observing marine creatures at the local marine life observation station, and successfully defends his right (against the landlady) to have a small aquarium in the rented apartment. He also earns a significant paycheck by writing radio advertisements, but that sort of work repels him. Urged by his brother to get a job, he becomes a lifeguard at the municipal swimming pool.

In flashback scenes the audience learns that the boys used to spend pleasant summers at a Wisconsin lake with their family, often swimming across the lake for sport. The final such summer ended in tragedy - Michael had been busy with his career by then and was not at the lake; Matthew and his father began swimming across the lake but the father suffered cramps midway and drowned despite Matthew's frantic efforts to save him.

Much of the film is devoted to Matthew's inner thoughts, including his conversations and visits with Jesus. Matthew tells us at the film's beginning that his stream-of-consciousness thoughts are like having a radio inside, with the dial being constantly tuned across the spectrum of available stations.

Michael is dating a girl, Natalie, and is considering asking her hand in marriage. However, he is often insensitive to her emotional needs, a fact which his younger brother recognizes and tries to help with. Matthew then becomes emotionally attached to Natalie, but finally realizes that in order to keep his brother, he must give Natalie up, much as he gave up his father. The heaviness of this realization drives him to a suicide attempt. He concludes that God wants people to give everything to God, at least everything they value dearly.

== Cast ==
- William McNamara as Matthew Anderson
- Elisabeth Shue as Natalie
- Dylan Walsh as Michael Anderson
- Peewee Love as T.J.
- Leslie Erganian as Mrs. Anderson
- Steve Zurk as Mr. Anderson
- Ilse Earl as Mrs. Piccalo, the landlady
- Ara Madzounian as Jesus
- Tony Fabozzi as Ford
- Brett Murray as Young Matthew Anderson
- Justin Taylor as Young Michael Anderson
