= Barium sodium niobate =

Names
- IUPAC name Barium sodium pentaniobate
- Other names BNN; banana

Identifiers
3D model (JSmol)	Interactive image
ChemSpider	17340490
PubChem CID	16212681
- InChI: InChI=1S/2Ba.Na.5Nb.15O/q2*+2;+1;;;;;;;;;;;;;;;;5*-1 Key: YGDAIEWZARDCHJ-UHFFFAOYSA-N
- SMILES: [O-][Nb]1(=O)O[Nb](=O)(O[Nb](=O)(O[Nb](=O)(O[Nb](=O)(O1)[O-])[O-])[O-])[O-].[Na+].[Ba+2].[Ba+2]

Properties
Chemical formula	Ba_{2}NaNb_{5}O_{15}
Appearance	Colourless to pale yellow transparent crystals
Solubility in water	Insoluble

Structure
Crystal structure	Tetragonal tungsten bronze (filled)
Space group	Ama2 (room temperature)
Point group	mm2
- Except where otherwise noted, data are given for materials in their standard state (at 25 °C [77 °F], 100 kPa). Infobox references

Barium sodium niobate (BNN) (Ba_{2}NaNb_{5}O_{15}) is a ferroelectric crystal of the family of materials known as tetragonal tungsten bronzes (TTBs). This material has an orthorhombic crystal structure with room temperature point symmetry of mm2. It has large nonlinear optical coefficients and exhibits great electro-optic properties. The simple name given to this compound in the materials science community is "banana".

The BNN material exhibits a ferroelectric phase transition around 570 °C (Curie temperature). Above this temperature the paraelectric tetragonal phase takes over in the BNN and this phase transition is a first order transition. The BNN crystals possess a high resistance to optically induced degradation of the refractive index (a problem which occurs in the related compound lithium niobate), a high spontaneous polarization and high electro-optical properties.

BNN is an interesting material due to its application in nonlinear optics, electro-optic devices and thin film ferroelectrics. Although the crystal structure of BNN was determined in 1969 by Jamieson, Abrahams, and Bernstein, the space group was unclear until 2023 when it could be clearly determined using powder diffraction and density functional theory calculations.

== Crystal structure ==
Barium sodium niobate has a tetragonal tungsten bronze (TTB) structure composed of corner sharing NbO_{6} octahedra that form triangular, square and pentagonal channels which contain various metal cation compositions. The general formula for these structures is A_{2}^{2+}A^{1+}CB^{1+}B_{2}^{4+}O_{15}. In filled TTB (BNN) structures A2 sites (pentagonal channels) are dominated by Ba^{2+} ions and A1 sites (square channels) are dominated by Na^{+} ions. There is also a vacant triangular site (C). These compounds have been found to show some disorder in their Na/Ba cations between A1 and A2 sites.

BNN exhibits a structural phase transition. Above ~840K (~570 °C) the crystal structure transforms to a non-polar aristotype tetragonal structure with space group P4/mbm (No. 127). At this temperature it becomes ferroelectric with a polar tetragonal crystal structure with space group P4bm (No. 100). A phase transition occurs at ~540K (~270 °C) to a ferroelastic orthorhombic crystal structure.

The room temperature space group has been highly controversial, with an initial room temperature structure being solved by Jamieson, Abrahams and Bernstein in 1969. This gave a space group of Cmm2 (No.35). Other groups have since proposed other space groups such as Ccm2 (No.36) and Bbm2 (No. 40). A powder x-ray diffraction and density functional theory study by Aamlid, Selbach and Grande in 2020 has proven that the room temperature structure is actually Cmm2 with significant cation disorder. However, a study by Grendal, Evans and Aamlid in 2023 has used high resolution synchrotron x-ray and neutron powder diffraction and density functional theory to show that the average structure of BNN is best described with the space group Ama2 (standard setting of Bbm2). They observed no extra phase transitions below the ferroelastic phase transition, however they note that this doesn't rule out the Ama2 space group as it can be considered as just an approximate space group for an incommensurate structure.

The incommensurate phase has been observed in some studies through the presence of satellite reflections corresponding to an incommensurate structure. However, as of 2023 there is no literature on any structural solution to the incommensurate phase.

== Physical properties ==
=== Ferroelectric and ferroelastic properties ===
The material is a uniaxial ferroelectric, possessing a large spontaneous polarization along the tetragonal c-axis. The Curie temperature is typically around 585 °C depending upon thermal history of the crystal. This transition is sharp/first order and leads to an expansion of the ferroelectric unit cell along the c-direction. There is also a ferroelastic second order phase transition that occurs at around 270 °C. This transition is unrelated to the ferroelectric order parameter and occurs perpendicular to the c-axis and within the ab-plane. This has no effect on the spontaneous polarization. The spontaneous polarization of BNN is about 40 μC/cm^{2} and the dielectric constant along the c-axis is about 51.

The ferroelectric phase transition in the BNN is considered to be an order-disorder type. This is inferred from strong central peak in the broadband Brillouin scattering results near TC (560 °C) and slowing down of relaxation time near TC. The presence of polarization fluctuations along c-axis with no optical soft mode (signature of order-disorder type phase transition) also supports that the phase transition is of order-disorder type.

=== Nonlinear optical and electro-optic properties ===
It can be estimated that the nonlinear optical coefficients of BNN are double those of LiNbO_{3}. BNN also shows a significant benefit over LiNbO3 as there is no evidence of refractive index inhomogeneities (optical damage) due to optical energy at room temperature. Additionally, unique and repeatable phase matching temperatures have been recorded for nonlinear optical applications. An Electro-Optic Half Wave Voltage of 1570V has been found in the optimal direction.

== History ==
The first report on the nonlinear optical properties of Ba_{2}NaNb_{5}O_{15} was published by J. E. Geusic, H. J. Levinstein, J. J. Rubin, S. Singh and L. G. Van Uitert from Bell Laboratories in 1967. The nonlinear optical coefficients were found to be approximately double those of LiNbO_{3}. It was also found that the crystal exhibited no optical damage at room temperature. In 1968 J. E. Geusic, from Bell Laboratories, Richard Smith, J.E. Geusic H.J. Levinstein, J.J. Rubin, S. Singh and L.G. Van Uitert developed the first continuous wave optical parametric oscillator using BNN as a nonlinear material. This was tunable over a wide frequency range. The first crystal structure of BNN was published in 1969 by G.A. Jamieson and his team (W.B. Abrahams and W.N. Bernstein) in the Journal of Chemical Physics. They determined the tetragonal tungsten bronze structure and the positions of Ba and Na atoms.

Over the following decades BNN became of scientific interest due to its electro-optical and second harmonic generation properties. Similar solid solutions in the BNN-family were studied by Soviet Scientists in the 1970's. The main focus was on the potassium doped BNN family solid solutions (K_{x}Na_{1-x}Ba_{2}Nb_{5}O_{15}). The temperature of phase-match, curie-temperature and half-wave-voltage was determined over the complete composition range.

The competing space groups were Cmm2, Ccm21 and Bbm2 (default : Ama2). There has been some controversy surrounding its room temperature structure for decades since the crystal structure was published by Jamieson. However, due to recent work by Grendal, Evans and Aamlid in 2023 using high-resolution synchrotron x-ray and neutron powder diffraction along with density functional theory it has been determined that an average structure is best represented under the Ama2 space group at room temperature.

== Applications ==
=== Nonlinear optics and frequency conversion ===
BNN has also shown to be useful as a nonlinear crystal for second harmonic generation (infrared to visible) conversions. It has double the nonlinear optical coefficients compared to LiNbO_{3} and since it has a high laser induced damage threshold it has potential to be used in high laser intensity environments. Where LiNbO_{3} would be damaged by photorefractive effects due to the laser intensity, BNN can withstand a higher intensity. This was attributed to the fact that BNN has a filled TTB structure with all the A sites filled. In 1968 BNN was shown to be useful as a nonlinear material in a continuous wave tunable optical parametric oscillator. This is only an example of many useful tungsten-bronze ferroelectrics. These are a large group of materials with many useful properties which have many applications in telecommunication uses such as electro-optics, photorefractivity and nonlinear optics including second harmonic generation.

=== Electro-optic and photorefractive applications ===
BNN has also been investigated for application to an electro-optic modulator. The half-wave voltage for this BNN in the optimum direction has been reported to have an electro-optic half-wave voltage of 1570 V.

=== Thin films ===
A thin film of BNN was fabricated for application to a nonvolatile ferroelectric memory and electro-optic application. A 450 nm thin film was fabricated using the H-MOD process of the hybrid metal-organic decomposition method on silicon and platinized silicon substrates. However, the main problem associated with bulk crystals is cracking when cooled through the Curie temperature (ca. 570 °C) due to the large thermal expansion in the c-axis at the phase transition.

=== Laser gain media ===
Single crystals of BNN doped with neodymium (Nd^{3+}) were investigated as laser gain media. The dielectric anomalies of Nd^{3+} doped BNN single crystals can be affected by their thermal history.

== Synthesis and crystal growth ==
Schematic of the Czochralski process, used to grow single crystals of Ba₂NaNb₅O₁₅.

Optic grade large BNN single crystals can be grown by the so-called Czochralski technique: pulling a single crystal from a melt along the tetragonal axis. However, a main obstacle for the industrial-scale fabrication of bulk BNN single crystals is the cracking of the crystals during cooling from the growth temperature down to the Curie temperature at which the BNN is obtained (~570°C), since the much larger c-axis expands. Therefore, while crystal has excellent optical properties, it is still to be used in industrial applications.

Nanocrystalline BNN powders were also prepared by a citrate-assisted sol-gel process, the procedure being known for providing phases with significantly lower heat treatment temperature than that of the solid-state reaction method. By this procedure, BNN was also obtained by Kundu and Varma in 2013 at about 923K. The authors found the orthorhombic lattice after annealing the powders for 10 hours at 923K, with strong photoluminescence emissions under visible light at room temperature.

BNN thin films were synthesized using the hybrid metal organic decomposition (H-MOD) method. BNN thin films were deposited on bare silicon and platinized silicon substrates. The deposited thin films were crack-free and measured around 450 nm in thickness. Crystalline of stoichiometric BNN thin films was attained by annealing at 1000 °C that formed a single phase tungsten bronze.

== Ongoing research ==
BNN at room temperature has remained contentious for nearly fifty years concerning its space group. Grendal et al (2023) have proved that the Ama2 space group of BNN was the best model for the high resolution synchrotron X-ray and neutron powder diffraction data by using symmetry mode analysis and density functional theory. This data effectively has ended the controversy of the space group of BNN at room temperature. However the data cannot rule out completely that the Ama2 is an averaged model of the incommensurate structure.

However, measurements of sample below the ferroelastic transition revealed incommensurate structural modulations (satellites reflections). A full structural solution of the incommensurate phase(s) in BNN has not been published as of 2023.

A symmetry mode analysis was performed by Grendal et. Al. (2023) that confirmed an active anti-polar mode (44, irrep M5) existing in the Ama2 structure. The authors suggested that the glassy microstructure, the memory effects, and the rate-dependent properties described in the literature can be tied to the formation and annihilation of anti-polar correlation in the ferroelastic domains.

The ferroelectric instability in BNN is of order-disorder type, unlike most of the oxide ferroelectrics currently studied. No optical soft mode has so far been observed in BNN. However, broadband Brillouin scattering measurements have uncovered a prominent critical slowing down of the polarization relaxation time near T C =560 °C, consistent with an order-disorder phase transition.
