= Hi Fashion =

American electropop duo

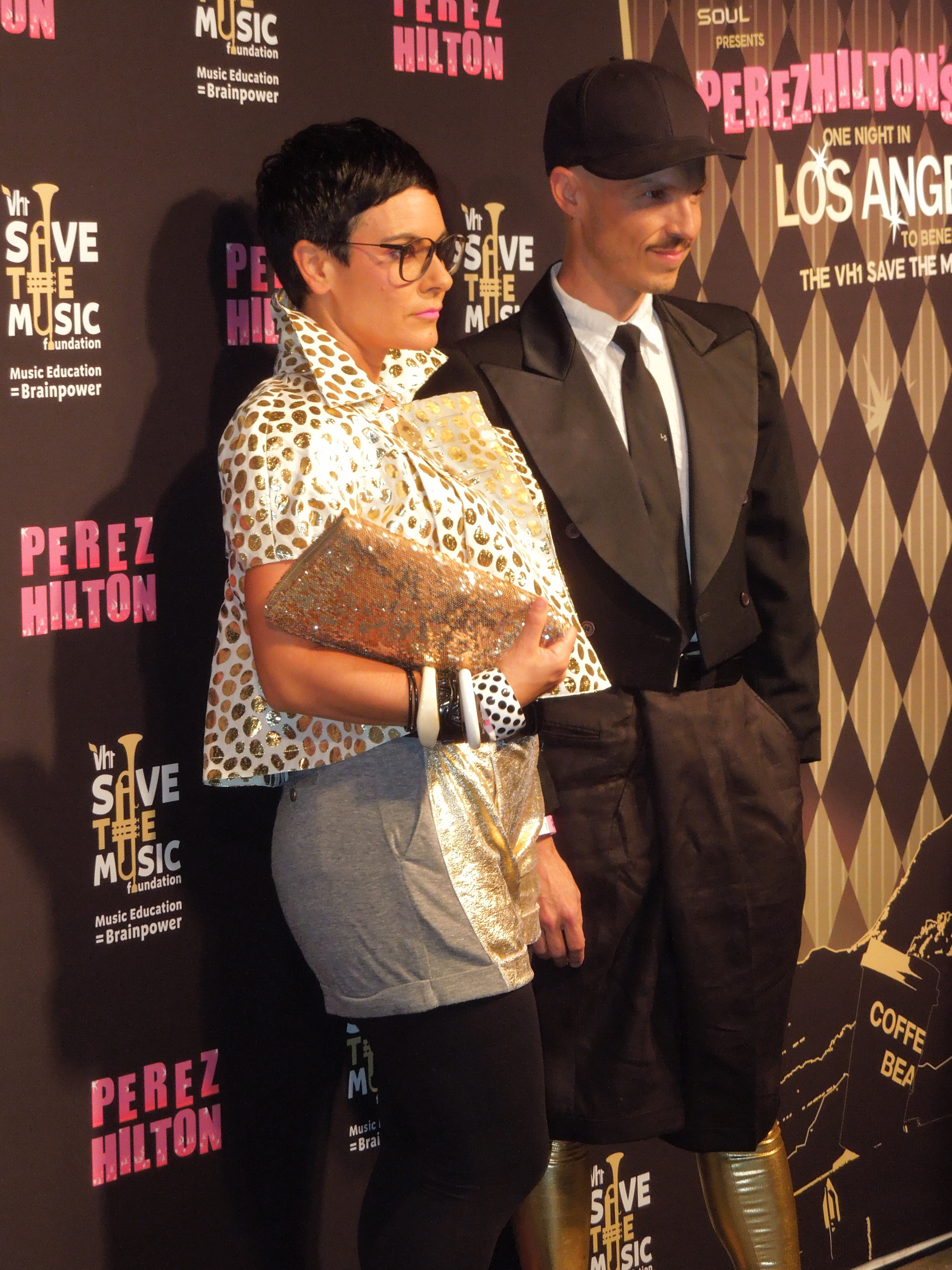

Background information
- Origin: Los Angeles, US
- Genres: Electropop
- Years active: 2009–2017
- Members: Jen DM; Rick Gradone
- Website: theworldofhifashion.com

Hi Fashion was an American electropop duo consisting of Jen DM and Rick Gradone. The band's music features electronic, upbeat pop songs, many with ironic and humorous lyrics. DM and Gradone are both originally from New York but both are now based in Los Angeles. Hi Fashion released two EPs: their 2011 debut Sprechen Sie Hi Fashion? and 2013 follow up You Are Gorgeous.

== Biography ==
Gradone and DM met in a gay bar in New York City, where Gradone mistook DM for a man and flirted with her. The pair became friends and DM invited Gradone to a benefit concert, where she was performing. After hearing DM sing, Gradone invited DM to form a band together, which she initially refused. Gradone then sent DM three tracks to listen to and asked again if she would work with him. DM had plans to start an all-woman metal band but agreed to join Gradone, forming Hi Fashion.

Originally, the pair named the band "Hi-Fashion $5.99". They later changed the name to "Hi-Fashion $9.99", then dropped the price tag and became known simply as "Hi Fashion".

Hi Fashion's first single "Amazing" was released in July 2010. Their debut EP Sprechen Sie Hi Fashion? followed a year later in July 2011. They subsequently released several singles from the album on iTunes with accompanying music videos on YouTube.

The duo announced a second EP in April 2013, titled You Are Gorgeous. They raised over $25,000 on Kickstarter in order to support and produce the album, which was released in July 2013.

The duo maintain a lavish and outlandish fashion style across music videos and live performances. Many of the clothing items are made by the band themselves.

On November 16, 2017, the band announced on their Facebook page that they were disbanding.

== Discography ==
Studio albums

- Sprechen Sie Hi Fashion? (July 2011)
- You Are Gorgeous (July 2013)

Singles

- Amazing (July 2010)
- You Tuk my Luk (March 2012)
- Special Delivery Love (July 2012)
- Eighteen (April 2013)
- Lighthouse (July 2013)
- Pupusa (October 2013)
- Freak Your Halls (December 2013)
- Where is the Party? (April 2015)
- Mother Sister Father Brother (August 2015)

== In popular culture ==
Hi Fashion's first single, "Amazing", was featured in the teaser for season 6 of RuPaul's Drag Race in December 2013 and also in the 2015 film, The Duff.

"Lighthouse" was featured in the soundtrack for the 2014 film G.B.F..
