= Portia Gwanzura =

- Born: Portia Gwanzura; 22 May 1967 (age 59); Norton
- Origin: Mhondoro, Zimbabwe
- Genre: Traditional music
- Instruments: Mbira; Drums
- Years active: 1992–present
- Label: Hohodza
- Website: https://portiagwanzura.com

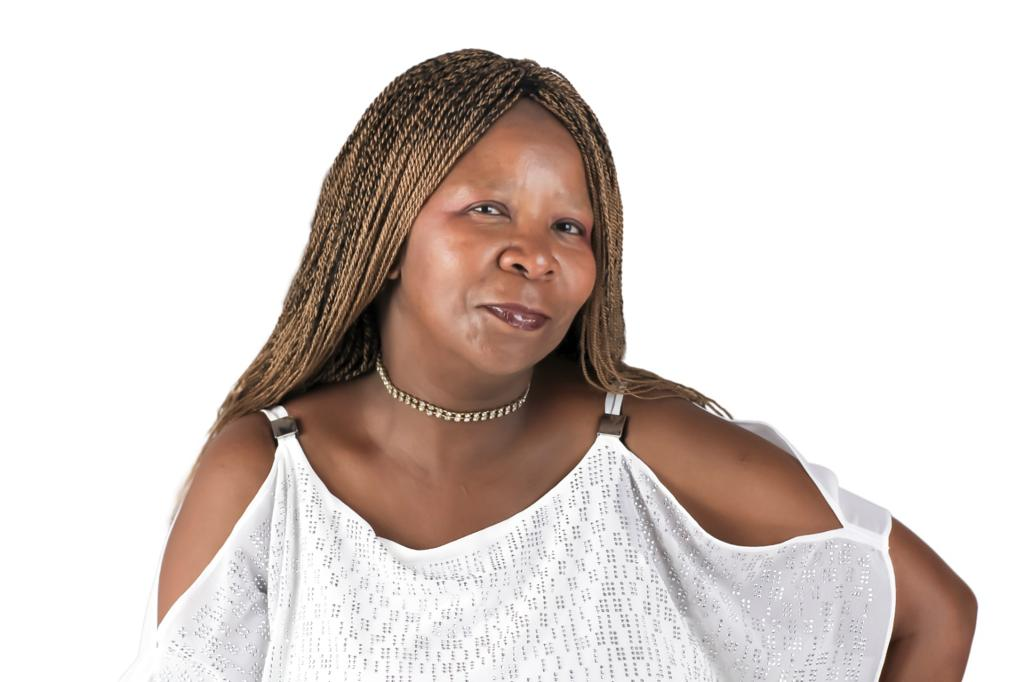

Portia Gwanzura (b. 1967) is a Manchester based Zimbabwean singer and founder of music group Hohodza Band. She is known for being the first woman to form and lead a band in Zimbabwe when she established Hohodza Band which performed African dance, music and culture.

== Background ==
Portia Gwanzura was born in Norton, Zimbabwe. She grew up in Mhondoro village, she moved to Harare when she was a teenager then relocated to the United Kingdom in 2002. In 1992, Portia formed Hohodza, the first female led band to be formed in Zimbabwe which was made up of school leavers at the time. She has recorded fifteen studio albums with the band. In 1995, Hohodza was voted as third best band in Zimbabwe by The Herald (Zimbabwe) readers across Zimbabwe.

== Discography ==
=== Albums ===
- Mudzimu Hautengwi
- Dande
- Nherera
- Vabereki
- Dzorai Moyo
- Hupenyu
- Tungwa Tungwa
- Zvinoda Kushinga
- Ndotamba Naniko
- Chaitemura Chave Kuseva
- Best of Hohodza
- Detembedzo
- Dopiro Renzeve
- Tsangayedziva
- Pfimbi

=== Singles ===
- You're My Best Friend Cover 2020
- Kabhegi Remix 2020
- Kumhondoro 2020
- Anamhofu 2020
- Sarura Wako 2021
- Vana 2021
- Ndinoda kumbofara 2021
- Dhiya Mumoyo Mangu 2021

== Achievements ==
- 2001 - Portia Gwanzura & Hohodza voted third best band in Zimbabwe.
- 2002 - Portia Gwanzura was chosen to represent “The Rights of African Women” as a whole and made representations in the house of commons to MP's.
- 2003 - Portia Gwanzura performed on BBC 3 program Cyderdelic - She was chosen to sing lead vocals on a song originally done by The Beatles whilst Dave Stuart played the guitar.
- 2004 - Portia Gwanzura received wholesome praise from the late DJ John Peel who described her band as making fantastic music and was also interviewed on Radio Five Live

She has performed live on the BBC's Andy Kershaw Show, was interviewed for the Esther Rantzen show on Granada TV and performed for the Mayor of Wigans "Christmas Cheers " fund to raise money for the local community. Up until 2006 Portia Gwanzura and her band recorded fifteen albums with the eleventh being launched in England by then Junior Minister and MP for Leigh Andy Burnham. In 2007, Portia Gwanzura chosen by the Wigan Borough Council as one of the ten most recognised people in the Borough for her contribution to the local community. In 2015, Portia was presented with Station Honor Award from ZimOnline Radio.
