= Mark Tarlov =

American film producer and director (1952–2021)

- Born: 1952; Norwalk, Connecticut, U.S.
- Died: July 31, 2021 (aged 69); New York City, U.S.
- Spouse: Judith Roberts
- Children: Jessica Tarlov; Molly Tarlov

Mark Tarlov (1952 – July 31, 2021) was an American film producer and director, attorney, speechwriter, and winemaker. His daughters are political commentator Jessica Tarlov and actress Molly Tarlov.

== Death ==
Tarlov died of cancer, aged 69, on July 31, 2021, at his Manhattan home.

== Filmography ==
He was a producer in all films unless otherwise noted.

=== Film ===
Year	Film	Credit	Notes
1983	Christine	Executive producer	
1986	Power		
1987	White Water Summer		
1989	Second Sight		
1990	Tune in Tomorrow		
1991	Mortal Thoughts		
1993	Beyond the Law		
1994	Serial Mom		
1994	A Good Man in Africa		
1994	Radio Inside		
1995	Copycat		
1996	I Love You, I Love You Not		
1997	The Man Who Knew Too Little	Producer	
1998	Pecker	Producer	
2000	Cecil B. Demented		
2003	Undermind		
2003	Second Born		Final film as a producer

As director

Year	Film
1999	Simply Irresistible
2004	Temptation

=== Television ===
Year	Title	Credit	Notes
1985	Reckless Disregard	Executive producer	Television film
