= BNN Breaking =

News website (2022–2024)

- Website type: News aggregator; fake news website
- Headquarters: Hong Kong
- Founder: Gurbaksh Chahal
- Website: bnnbreaking.com/about
- Launched: 2022; 4 years ago

BNN Breaking was a news website based in Hong Kong, launched in 2022 by Indian-American entrepreneur Gurbaksh Chahal. It was criticized for posting a number of misleading and inaccurate news stories, using AI-driven content aggregation.

== Reception ==
The BNN Breaking website claimed to have an extensive network of reporters on the ground that supply information to major news outlets. However, it has been described by others as a news aggregator, and has also been accused of using artificial intelligence to extract and summarize news from other sources, often resulting in misleading and inaccurate coverage. For example, it has been noted that purported journalists credited by the site publish dozens of articles a day, indicating a potential use of AI-driven content aggregation. It has also been accused of spreading misinformation about prominent politicians and celebrities. The San Francisco Standard noted that the site was publishing hundreds of articles each day from "virtually every country on Earth".

=== Fake news ===
In October 2023, BNN Breaking published three articles that were critical of San Francisco Supervisor Dean Preston, all of which contained misleading or false information. One of the articles described Preston as "arguably the most attention-seeking, spineless, and downright insufferable politician the city has ever seen." The same article included a comment by BNN Breaking founder Gurbaksh Chahal which asserted that the network maintains a "commitment to impartiality".

The first article included fake quotes attributed to Preston and the inaccurate claim that he had resigned from his District 5 office after a Twitter exchange with Elon Musk; an apparent error by the article's author in aggregating news that he had in fact left Twitter after Musk suggested he should be jailed and pledged $100,000 for a campaign to oust him from office. This misinformation was then picked up by Microsoft's news aggregation site MSN. The article was finally modified over 18 hours after it first went live to reflect that Preston's departure was from Twitter and not his political office. However, it did not acknowledge that the correction had been made and retained multiple fake quotes attributed to Preston. Gurbaksh Chahal also minimized the impact of the false claims made by BNN Breaking, describing it as a "small oversight" and "a mistake that was promptly corrected". He then falsely claimed that Preston has not approached BNN Breaking for clarification, and accused him of "leveraging the San Francisco Chronicle for a personal attack against me, the founder."

A second article blamed Preston's policies for a spike in homelessness between 2017 and 2019, despite the fact that he had only assumed office in mid-December 2019. A further article claimed that an effort to get Preston recalled from office had gathered enough signatures to be put on the ballot, although no such effort existed. Preston responded to the incident by stating: "People deserve reliable news sources, I sincerely hope that this is not a preview of what’s to come and that we never normalize this kind of disinformation."

On 11 October 2023, an article published by BNN Breaking featured an image of Irish broadcaster Dave Fanning alongside the headline that a prominent Irish broadcaster was on trial for alleged sexual misconduct. The trial in question was unrelated to Fanning, and the article was taken down the day after it was published. In January 2024, Fanning launched legal action against BNN Breaking for defamation.

On 9 February 2024, BNN Breaking published an article that claimed that the Hampton Beach, New Hampshire restaurant L Street Tavern was closing down. BNN Breaking seemingly confused the restaurant with one with the same name in South Boston, Massachusetts that was being sold by its owners. The article was removed when a reporter for the local newspaper The Portsmouth Herald reached out to BNN Breaking.

In June 2024, The New York Times published an investigation based on interviews with former BNN employees, who confirmed that the site had been using generative AI to paraphrase news content from other sources. Initially, the employees performed some manual error checking, but the site eventually started publishing high volumes of purely AI generated stories, randomly assigned to the names of employees. In response to employee objections, Chahal wrote: "When I do this, I won’t have a need for any of you."

BNN shut down in April 2024 and relaunched as Trimfeed, which was temporarily taken offline in connection with The New York Times report.

== Suspension ==
=== Twitter ===
In June 2022, Twitter permanently suspended BNN Breaking and all associated accounts, which had previously been verified by Twitter. Despite being officially established in 2022, the BNN Breaking Twitter account @BNNBreaking dated back to 2015 and experienced a surge in followers during the COVID-19 pandemic starting in 2020. The account was previously owned by Netherlands-based BNO News, but was purchased and renamed by Chahal. BNN Breaking had up to 80 associated accounts on Twitter by the time they were permanently suspended for violations of Twitter's policy on spam and platform manipulation. Chahal accused Business Insider of "engineering" Twitter's enforcement of its policies against his company.

=== Google ===
As of March 2024, Google appeared to have deindexed all of BNN Breaking's site links and articles from search after numerous reports of stolen content.

== See also ==
- List of fake news websites
