= Sarkis Erganian =

Sarkis Erganian Սարգիս Երկանեան
- Born: 1870; Trebizond (Trabzon), Ottoman Empire
- Died: 1950 (aged 79–80); St. Louis, Missouri, U.S.

Sarkis Erganian (Armenian: Սարգիս Երկանեան; 1870 in Trabzon, Ottoman Empire – 1950 in St. Louis, Missouri) was an Ottoman Armenian painter.

== See also ==
- Armenians in Turkey
