= Baltic News Network =

News website focused on Baltic states topics

Baltic News Network (BNN) is a Baltic news website. It was founded on 1 September 2010, providing online news portals, mainly reporting for and about the Baltic region and countries of Latvia, Lithuania, and Estonia. News is published by Latvia Baltic News Network.

== History ==
BNN was founded on 1 September 2010 by Fred Zimmer to counter perceived Russian disinformation, and emerged as a respected news source for the Baltic region. Based around predominantly selling stories to newspapers in the Baltic region, it has come to be recognized as an important political news source.

The Latvian Baltic News Network GmbH is registered in Vienna, Austria.

The Baltic News Network is a member of the Independent Media Association.
