= Simply Irresistible (film) =

1999 romantic comedy film by Mark Tarlov

- Theatrical release poster
- Directed by: Mark Tarlov
- Written by: Judith Roberts
- Produced by: Jon Amiel; Joseph M. Caracciolo Jr.; John Fiedler
- Starring: Sarah Michelle Gellar; Sean Patrick Flanery; Patricia Clarkson; Dylan Baker; Christopher Durang; Larry Gilliard Jr.; Betty Buckley
- Cinematography: Robert M. Stevens
- Edited by: Paul Karasick
- Music by: Gil Goldstein
- Production companies: Regency Enterprises; Polar Entertainment Corporation
- Distributed by: 20th Century Fox
- Release date: February 5, 1999 (United States)
- Running time: 98 minutes
- Country: United States
- Language: English
- Budget: $6 million
- Box office: $4.4 million

Simply Irresistible is a 1999 American romantic comedy film directed by Mark Tarlov and was written by Judith Roberts, starring Sarah Michelle Gellar and Sean Patrick Flanery. The film was produced by Regency Enterprises and released by 20th Century Fox on February 5, 1999 to negative reviews from critics, and the film grossed $4.4 million against a $6 million budget.

== Plot ==
Amanda Shelton inherits her late mother's restaurant, but lacks the ability to cook. The restaurant is failing when Amanda meets a mysterious and possibly magical man at the local market. He introduces himself as Gene O'Reilly and claims to be an old friend of her mother's. He sells her crabs, one of which escapes cooking to become her personal mascot. While chasing the crab, Amanda meets Tom Bartlett, a department store manager at Henri Bendel on Fifth Avenue, who is opening an ambitious new restaurant inside his store. Though they are clearly attracted to each other, Tom is involved with a clingy but beautiful woman named Chris. Tom also talks about how he is an avid paper airplane enthusiast and has a display of them inside his office.

Later that day, Tom and Chris are on their way to lunch, where Tom plans to break up with Chris, but the cab driver, shown to be Gene, drops them at the wrong location—Amanda's restaurant, the Southern Cross. Tom sees Amanda outside, and decides they should have lunch there instead.

For unclear reasons, Amanda begins cooking her feelings into her food, and she miraculously becomes an impressive, creative chef. Chris, driven by Amanda's negative feelings toward her cooked into her own food, breaks up with Tom and begins smashing plates in the restaurant. Tom, however, is unbothered as he is more focused on how delicious his crab dish is, with Amanda aspiring to make a truly amazing dish.

Amanda visits Tom at Henri Bendel so that he can replace the plates that Chris broke. When he eats éclairs that Amanda baked her passion for Tom into and he feeds her one, they end up in a trance together. He shows her the space where the new restaurant will be, where they have a shared fantasy wherein they dance flirtatiously, and they begin a romance.

Meanwhile, after Tom's assistant Lois steals an éclair from Tom that Tom himself had stolen from one of Amanda's patrons and is enamored by how delicious it is, she buys as many éclairs from Amanda's restaurant as she can so she can seduce Jonathan Bendel, the owner of Henri Bendel.

As a result of her food improving overnight, the Southern Cross becomes increasingly successful. One night, Tom visits Amanda after the restaurant has closed and after tasting a dish of hers, they begin to kiss and start floating. Tom panics and breaks things off with Amanda, believing she is some kind of witch who is manipulating his feelings with magic.

When Amanda goes to confront Tom one last time at his office, she witnesses the violent tantrum and resignation of a celebrity French chef hired for Tom's new restaurant. When Jonathan realizes that Amanda cooked the éclairs Lois had fed him, he demands that Tom hire her for the opening, despite his protests.

On opening night, Amanda is initially shunned by the snobbish French staff and that, coupled with her continued heartbreak over Tom, causes her to unknowingly cook her sorrow into one of the first courses, causing the entire restaurant to sob uncontrollably. She eventually overcomes her self-doubt and reaches her full potential as a chef, and the opening is a complete success.

Stunned but enchanted by the remarkable effect Amanda's food has had on the guests, Tom goes after Amanda as she is leaving the opening. Though initially missing her in the elevator, Tom, upon returning to his office sees Amanda leaving in a cab. To get her attention, he throws one of his paper airplanes from a balcony into the cab. She hurries back, changes into a special dress he has picked out for her, and admits his love for her. In another moment of shared fantasy, the two reconcile on the dance floor and begin to levitate around the rest of the passionate couples, not noticing Gene is gleefully conducting the orchestra behind them while the crab wears a top hat, implying the magic that sparked in Amanda came from them.

== Cast ==
- Sarah Michelle Gellar as Amanda Shelton
- Sean Patrick Flanery as Tom Bartlett
- Patricia Clarkson as Lois McNally
- Dylan Baker as Jonathan Bendel
- Christopher Durang as Gene O'Reilly
- Larry Gilliard Jr. as Nolan Traynor
- Betty Buckley as Aunt Stella
- Amanda Peet as Chris
- Gabriel Macht as Charlie

== Production ==
The original working title for the film was "Vanilla Fog" as mentioned by Sarah Michelle Gellar on The Tonight Show.

According to Mark Tarlov, the director, the conception of the film arose from "intersection of eating and drinking and romance [...] part of my interest with the movie was this idea of being able to bend reality. How food and wine actually bends time and space [...] the whole Einsteinian view of bending time and space based on your position relative to the events that are happening."

Tarlov's wife, Judith Roberts, wrote the screenplay based on a story co-developed by Roberts and Tarlov. According to Tarlov, "the script was about a middle-aged young woman [...] who had never found romance before because she never found her passion. And when she found her passion—which was cooking—romance followed."

Tarlov pitched the film to Holly Hunter, who he intended to play the lead role, but the studio did not want her to play the part. Sarah Jessica Parker was then wanted, but the studio felt she was too old for the part. The character was then rewritten to a 20-year-old woman with Sarah Michelle Gellar landing the role. The studio wanted to cash in on her success from Buffy the Vampire Slayer.

== Reception ==
=== Critical response ===
Simply Irresistible was poorly received by critics. Though the acting has received praise, the screenplay has received criticism. On Rotten Tomatoes, the film has a rating of 16%, based on 31 reviews, with an average rating of 3.95/10. The site's consensus states: "Simply Irresistible is simply not." On Metacritic, the film has a score of 27 out of 100, based on 21 critics, indicating "generally unfavorable reviews". Audiences surveyed by CinemaScore gave the film a grade B−.

Roger Ebert of the Chicago Sun-Times gave the film three out of four stars, and stated "Old-fashioned and obvious, yes, like a featherweight comedy from the 1950s. But that's the charm". John Petrakis from the Chicago Tribune gave the film a negative review: "Falls prey to the all-too-contemporary problem of complicating the tale until the ending is not only obvious, but prayed for between yawns". Tom Meek from Film Threat described the film as "Insipid, maudlin mush".

=== Box office ===
The film opened at #9 at the North American box office making $2.2 million USD in its opening weekend.

== Soundtrack ==
1. "Little King" – The Hollowbodies
2. "Busted" – Jennifer Paige
3. "Falling" – Donna Lewis
4. "Got the Girl (Boy from Ipanama)" – Reiss
5. "The Angel of the Forever Sleep" – Marcy Playground
6. "Take Your Time" – Lori Carson
7. "Beautiful Girls" – Chris Lloyd
8. "Once in a Blue Moon" – Sydney Forest
9. "Parkway" – The Hang Ups
10. "Our Love Is Going to Live Forever" – Spain
11. "Bewitched, Bothered and Bewildered" – Katalina
12. "That Old Black Magic" (Harold Arlen) – Jessica

== Astaire references ==
The film contains references to four musical films of Fred Astaire:

- The Belle of New York (1952): Flanery and Gellar's floating to the ceiling evokes similar scenes involving Astaire and Vera-Ellen.
- Yolanda and the Thief (1945): Flanery selects flooring for his new restaurant that is a copy of the flooring used in the "Coffee Time" number. Dylan Baker comments: "This looks like something out of an MGM musical".
- Shall We Dance (1937): Flanery's confusion when faced with multiple images of Gellar echoes Astaire when confronted with multiple masked versions of Ginger Rogers in the Shall We Dance finale.
- Swing Time (1936): The layout of the restaurant at the end of the movie closely resembles the restaurant and night club, the "Silver Sandal."
