= Madonna impersonator =

Person that imitates American singer Madonna

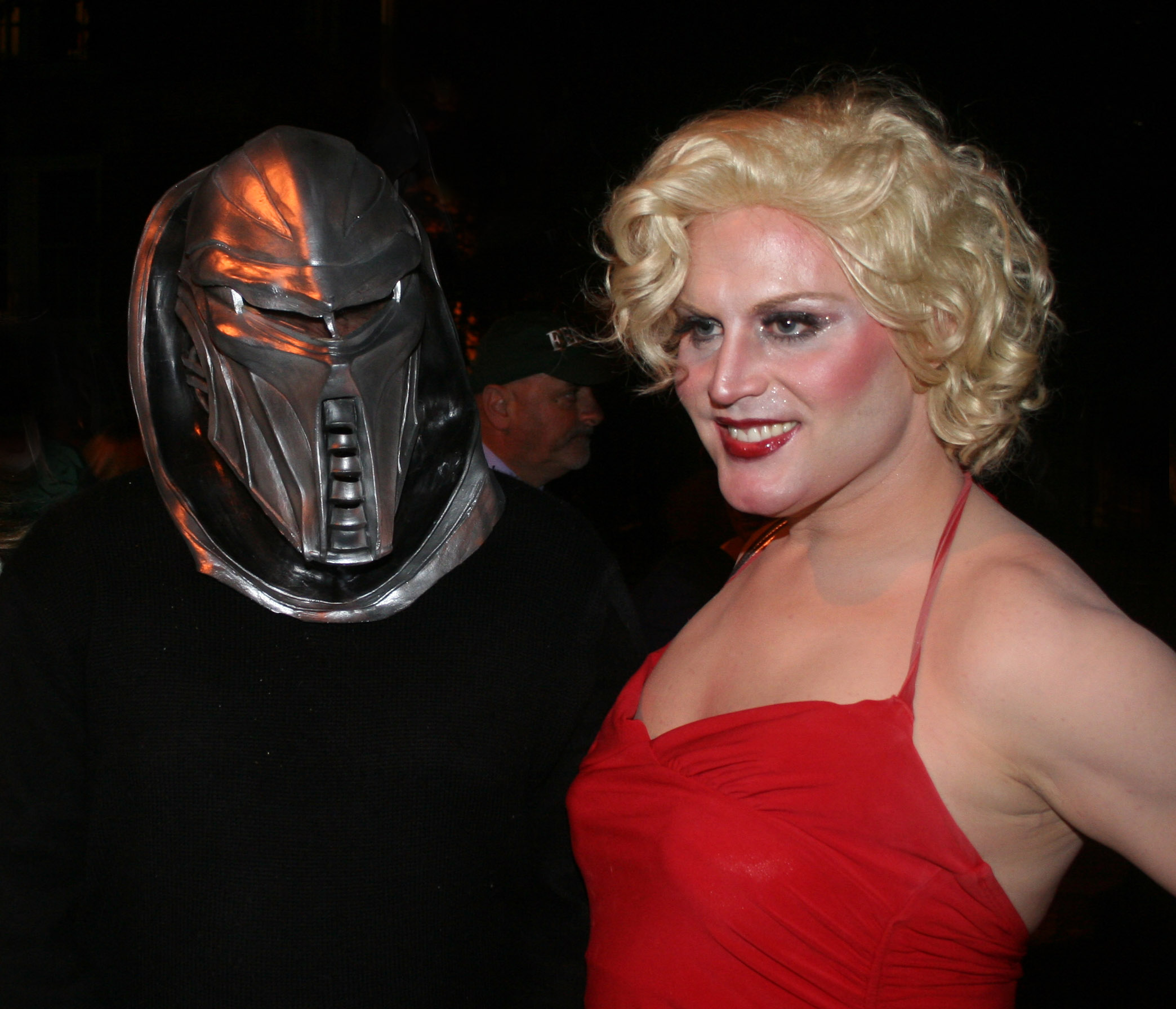
A Madonna drag-cosplay at the High Heel Drag Queen Race 2007

A Madonna impersonator is an entertainer who impersonates American singer-songwriter Madonna. Professional or dedicated Madonna impersonators have existed since at least the mid-1980s, and were sometimes sorted as "tribute acts". As an established artist, Madonna impersonators have seen a notable demand, many of them performing in front of thousands people and visiting several countries in their professional Madonna career as some media outlets have reported. Notable Madonna impersonators include Chris America, Denise Bella Vlasis and Venus D-Lite. Others impressionists have included Madonna in their repertoire, such as Tracey Bell, Charlie Hides and Véronic DiCaire, while Nadya Ginsburg and Alejandra Bogue dedicated Madonna-inspired monologues.

First impersonations on Madonna started with her fans, mainly young female audience when they copied and emulated her no later than 1985, and which were counted by thousands around the world. This phenomenon was later defined as the "Madonna wannabe". Prominent look-alikes contests were made and received press coverage. An example occurred in 1985 led by Macy's and had Andy Warhol and Nina Blackwood among others as judges. The winner gained nationwide briefly fame as "the best Madonna look-alike" according to MTV. Over the years, impersonations on Madonna have been documented among her fandom, through fan conventions, tours, and themed parties among other cultural manifestations, such as competitions and TV shows.

In early 2000s, J. Randy Taraborrelli considered Madonna as "one of the most emulated female performers in show business history". At some stage of her career, American journalist Ricardo Baca also estimated her as the most imitated woman in the world. The world record as the largest gathering of people dressed as Madonna at the same time in a single event is 440, registered in the Guinness World Records in 2014.

== Background and origins ==
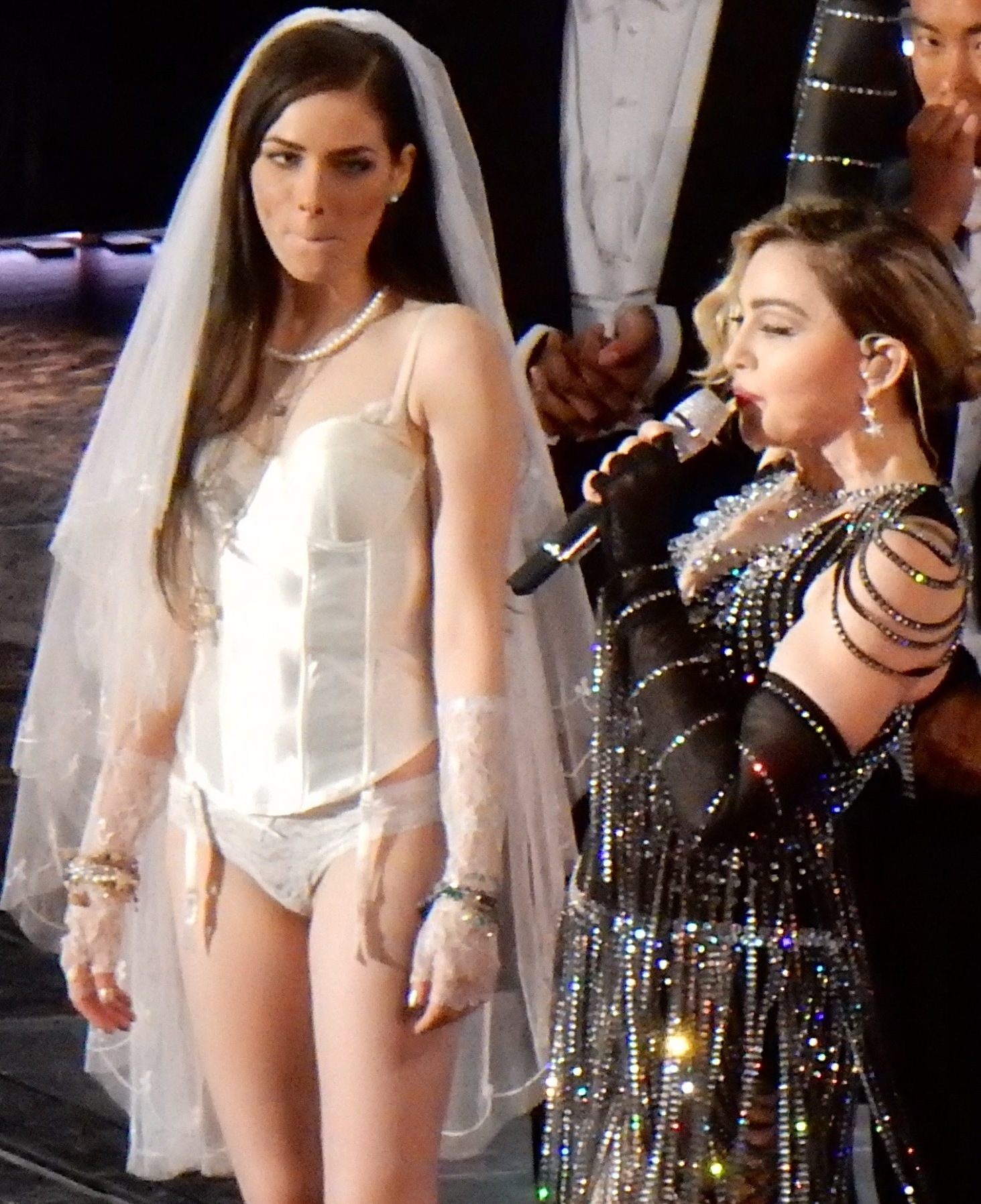
Madonna with a young female fan emulating her Like a Virgin-style during the Melbourne gig of the Rebel Heart Tour (2016)

Madonna inspired a substantial number of her fans to dress like her in her early years. The frenzy also called the Madonna wannabe phenomenon, made possible to some retailers opened up clothing departments inspired in her style. "Look-a-like Madonnas popped up all over the world", wrote European magazine Music & Media in 1985. One of the most significant contests was made by Macy's when they inaugurated Madonnaland the same year, having Andy Warhol, Madonna's stylist Maripol, MTV contributor Nina Blackwood, and Madonna: Lucky Star author Michael McKenzie as the judges. The winner, a 16-years-old girl, gained nationwide briefly fame as the best Madonna look-alike around according to Nicole Guanlao from MTV.

Professor Santiago Fouz-Hernandez wrote in Madonna's Drowned Worlds (2004), that for her emulators, there was a roadmap of designers, boutiques, stylists and personal shoppers, further saying "the list drew a map that any Madonna impersonator, from a professional drag performer to someone merely dressing for a social engagement, could follow". Since that year, part-time or full-time Madonna impersonators have existed.

== Levels of imitations ==
=== Types and reviews by authors ===
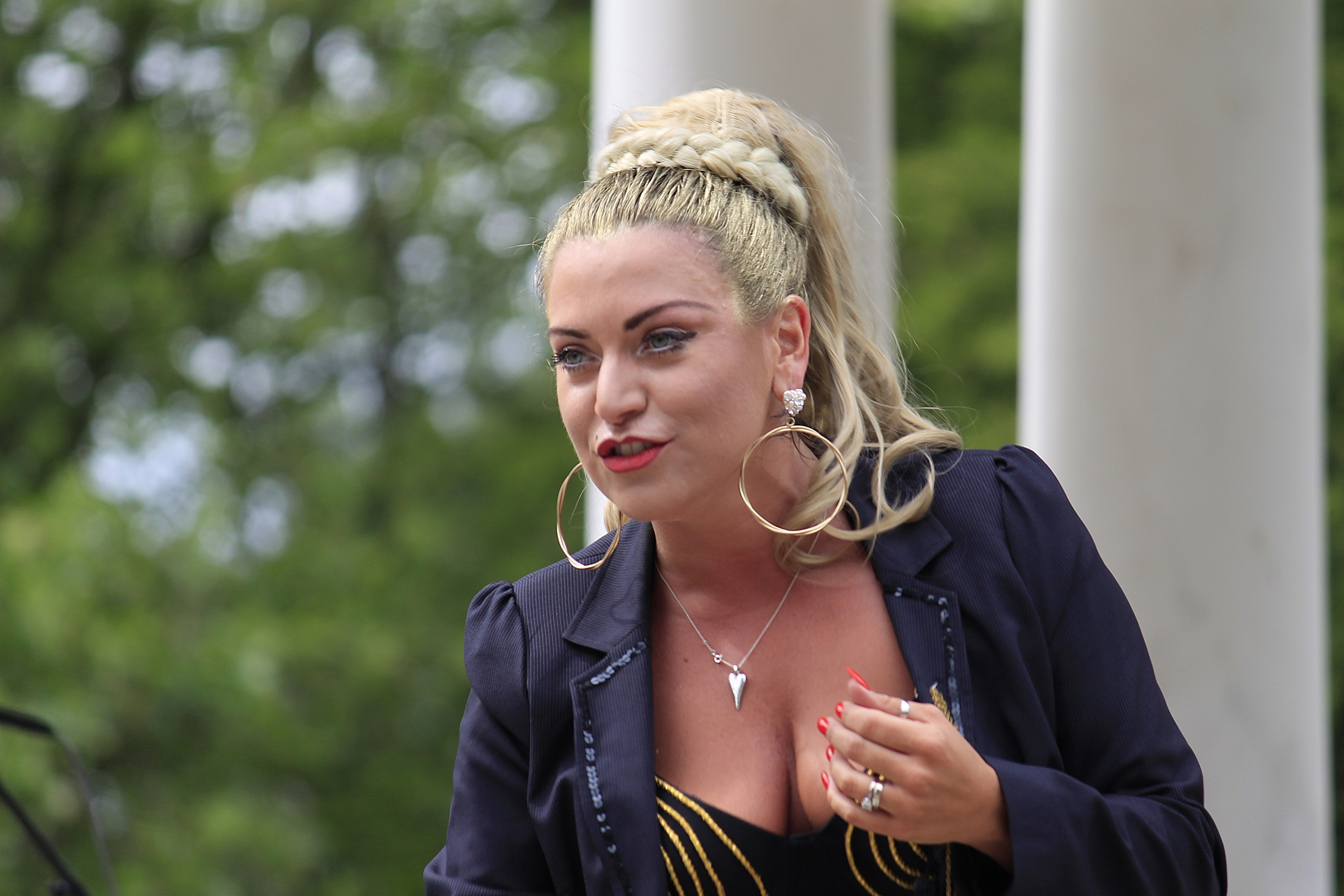
Nicola Marie, a former The X Factor participant (2012) and tribute act, channeling Madonna at Rotherham Pride parade in 2015

Over her decades-long career, Madonna impersonators have been look-alikes, cosplays, sound-alikes also incorporating drag performance, pastiche or parody. Various of her impersonators are tagged as tribute bands and even impressionists. Throughout amateur and other flattery forms, various fans have channeled the singer.

Journals or other authors have dedicated commentaries and analysis, including Australasian gay & lesbian law journal in 1993, and Joanne Garde-Hansen from University of Warwick in her book Media and Memory (2011). Justyna Stępień from University of Szczecin, also analyzed Madonna's case of impersonators and tribute bands such as all-males acts, "Mandonna" and "The Madonna". The first band, choose a kitsch representation of Madonna, in their fashion and vocal, which led Stępień to call it a "camp impersonation". Talking about gender differences, authors of Intercultural Communication: A Reader (2014) illustrated this point using Madonna's case: [A] female impersonator will attempt to look and sound as much like Madonna as possible, to create the illusion of Madonna as a tribute to her talent. The drag queen, on the other hand, will portray an exaggerated version of Madonna, playing with her persona to distort it in humorous or ironic ways.

=== Selected cultural depictions ===
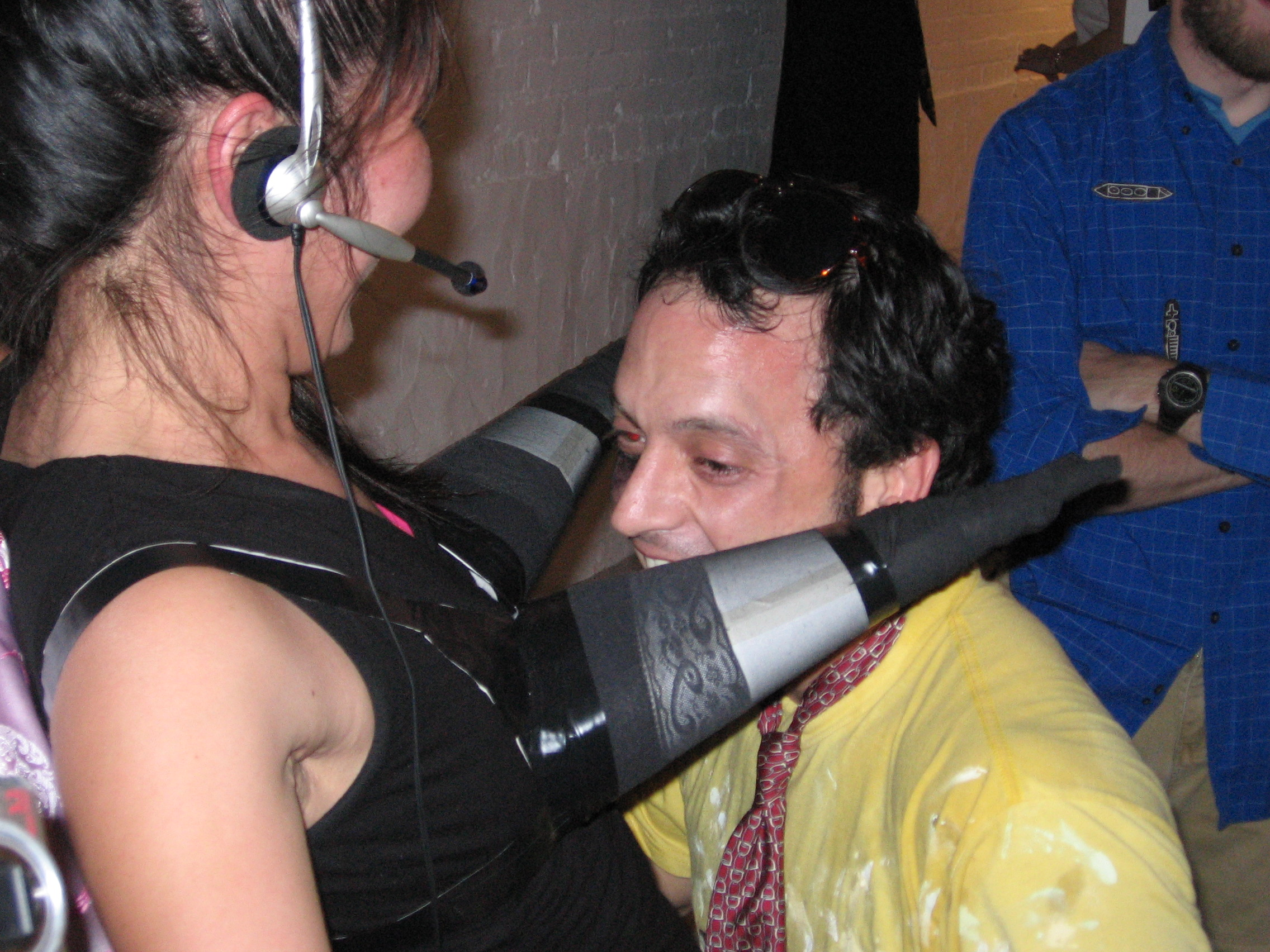
Johnny Knoxville with a woman channeling the Madonna-Blond Ambition Tour style

In 2014, an editor commented she is one of the "classics" female celebrities names who accumulate "numerous" impersonators in U.S contests. Coty Alexander, for example, have appeared in Legends in Concert, Las Vegas' longest-running tribute show according to Los Angeles Times in 2015. In Ibero-America, she has been performed in programs such as Mi nombre es..., Buscando una estrella, or both Chilean and Peruvian TV series Yo Soy. In Tu cara me suena from Spain, she has been imitated multiple times, included performers by Anna Simon, Carolina Ferre, Llum Barrera, Rosa López and Lucía Jiménez.

Satirical imitation have been also documented. Actor Joaquín Reyes made a Madonna impersonation at La Hora Chanante, which Spanish newspaper La Vanguardia later included as one of his best imitations on TV. Mexican trans woman performer, Alejandra Bogue ("La Bogue") dedicated a monologue series called No soy Madonna pero soy la Bogue which led to be toured in several theaters around the country. In 2022, Brazilian performer Michele Da Costa also personified Madonna at Melbourne International Comedy Festival with her show called Like a Virgo. Others satirical references, include videos like "Just Lose It" by Eminem or "Like a Surgeon" and "Perform This Way" both by "Weird Al" Yankovic.

A tribute show is also vaguely another form. Spanish actress Claudia Molina was hired to be Madonna in the Spanish tribute show, Remember. Live tribute to Madonna. Although Moline clarified she was an actress, not "a Madonna impersonator". Advertised events, such as when Tao Group Hospitality opened its restaurant Cathédrale in New York with famed attendees included Indya Moore, G-Eazy and David Arquette, used Madonna impersonators.

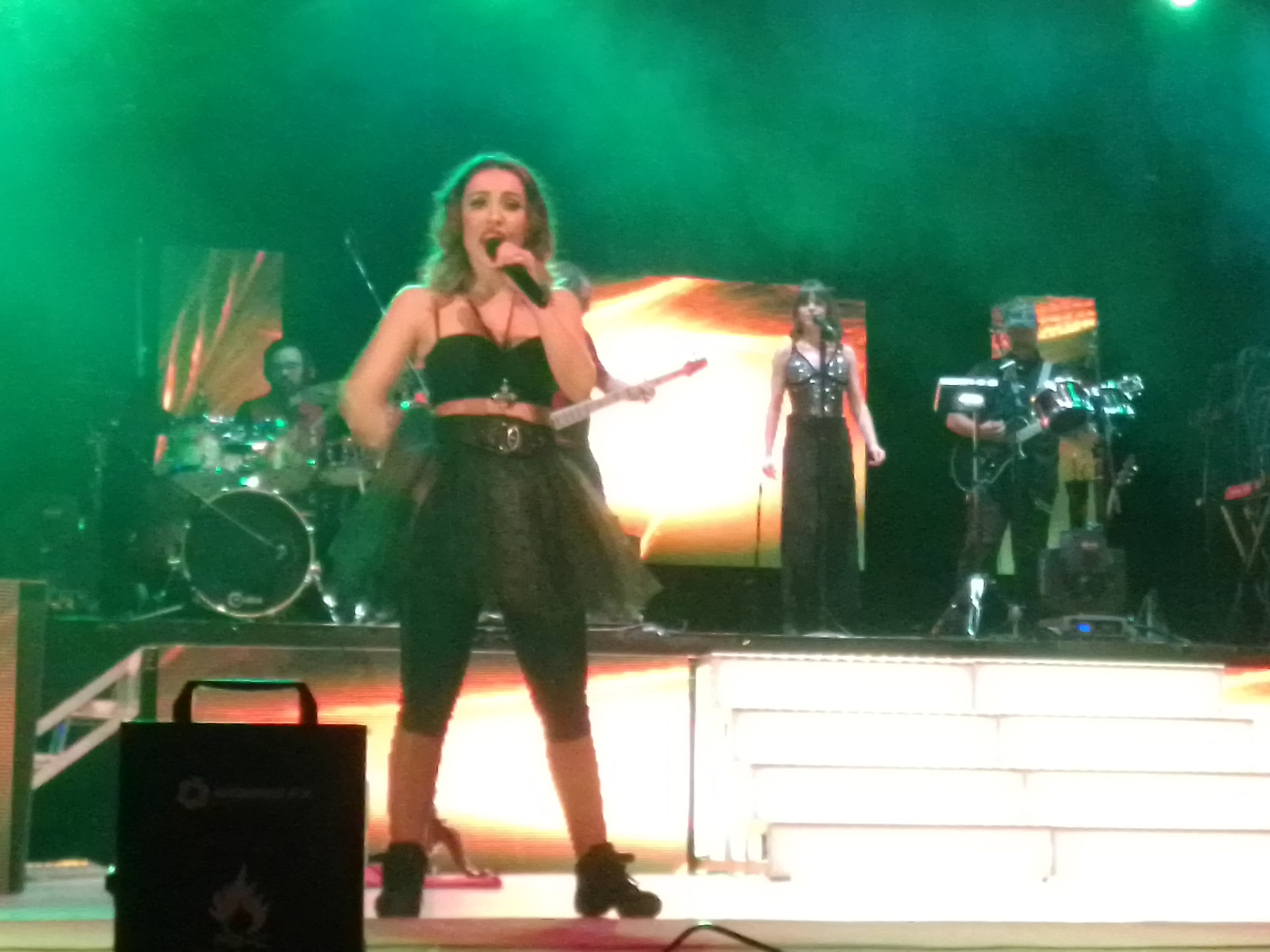
Spanish actress Claudia Molina during the 2019 tribute tour Remember tributo a Madonna

Others adopted Madonna as their identity in real life while receiving press coverage. "Madonna Badillo", a travesti woman who adopted Madonna's as her "alter ego" in her life, was a Venezuelan-born LGTB activist living in Maicao, Colombia. She was often called by the press as the "Colombian Madonna" or "Madonna from Maicao". A similar case was documented by Pedro Lemebel. In his book Loco afán: crónicas de sidario (1996), referred to "Madonna Mapuche", another travesti who adopted Madonna as their identity. Italian TV personality Paola Barale was sometimes referred to as a Madonna look-alike.

Various other examples were featured in books and noted in films. In 1994, author Frank Ching wrote about a 25-years-old male impersonator in China, called Wang Zheng, in a context of a conservative culture. Ukrainian activist Ulyana Bostwick as cited in Tatiana Mamonova and Chandra Niles Folsom's book Women's Glasnost Vs. Naglost: Stopping Russian Backlash (1994), talks about a Madonna-lip sync imitator from Latvia called Medea, who received coverage by several foreign and Soviets newspapers, but her appearances as a Madonna impersonator caused her some problems in the conservative Soviet culture of her time. William Gibson refers to a pornographic virtual reality program featuring a Madonna impersonator named "McDonna". Films such as Without You I'm Nothing (1990) includes a brief scene of Denise Bella Vlasis as Madonna, and Like a Virgin (2006) which plot is about a trans woman Madonna impersonator. In Weird: The Al Yankovic Story (2022), Evan Rachel Wood plays Madonna.

== Examples of dedicated Madonna impersonators ==
Impersonators

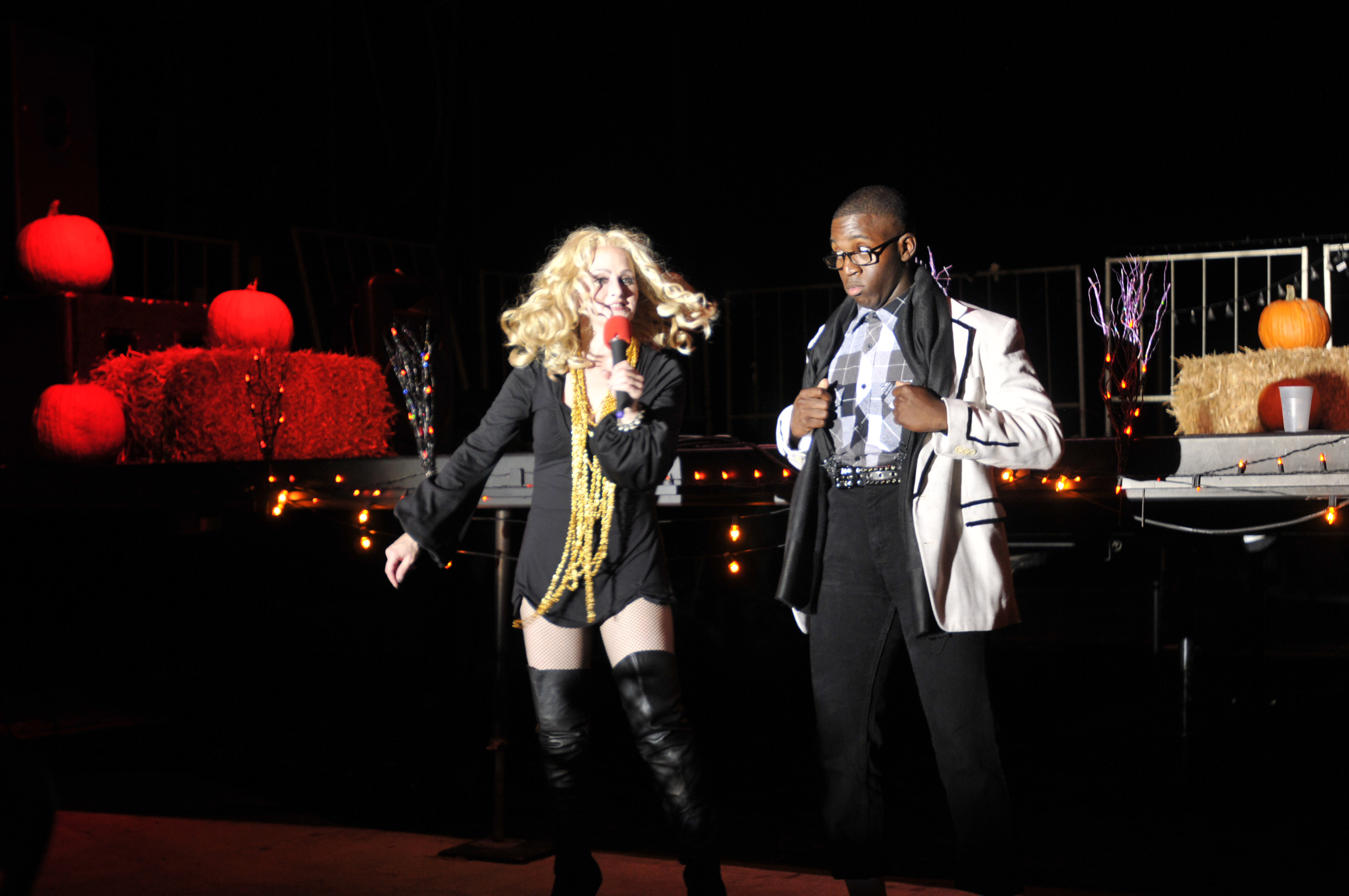
Chris America performing Madonna in the Guantanamo Bay Naval Base in 2010

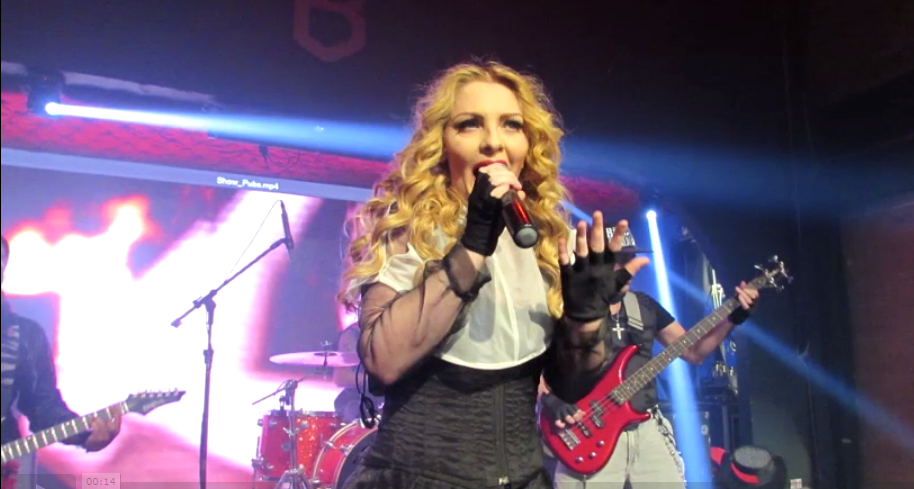
Verônica Pires performs onstage as Madonna in 2017

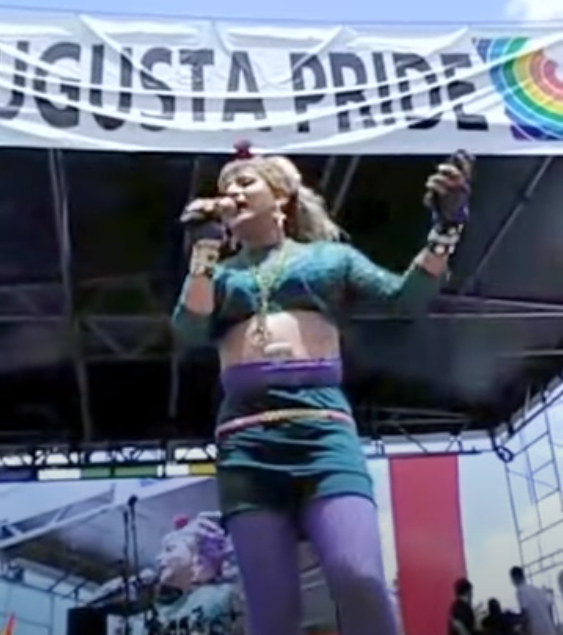
Venus D-Lite at the Augusta Pride 2017

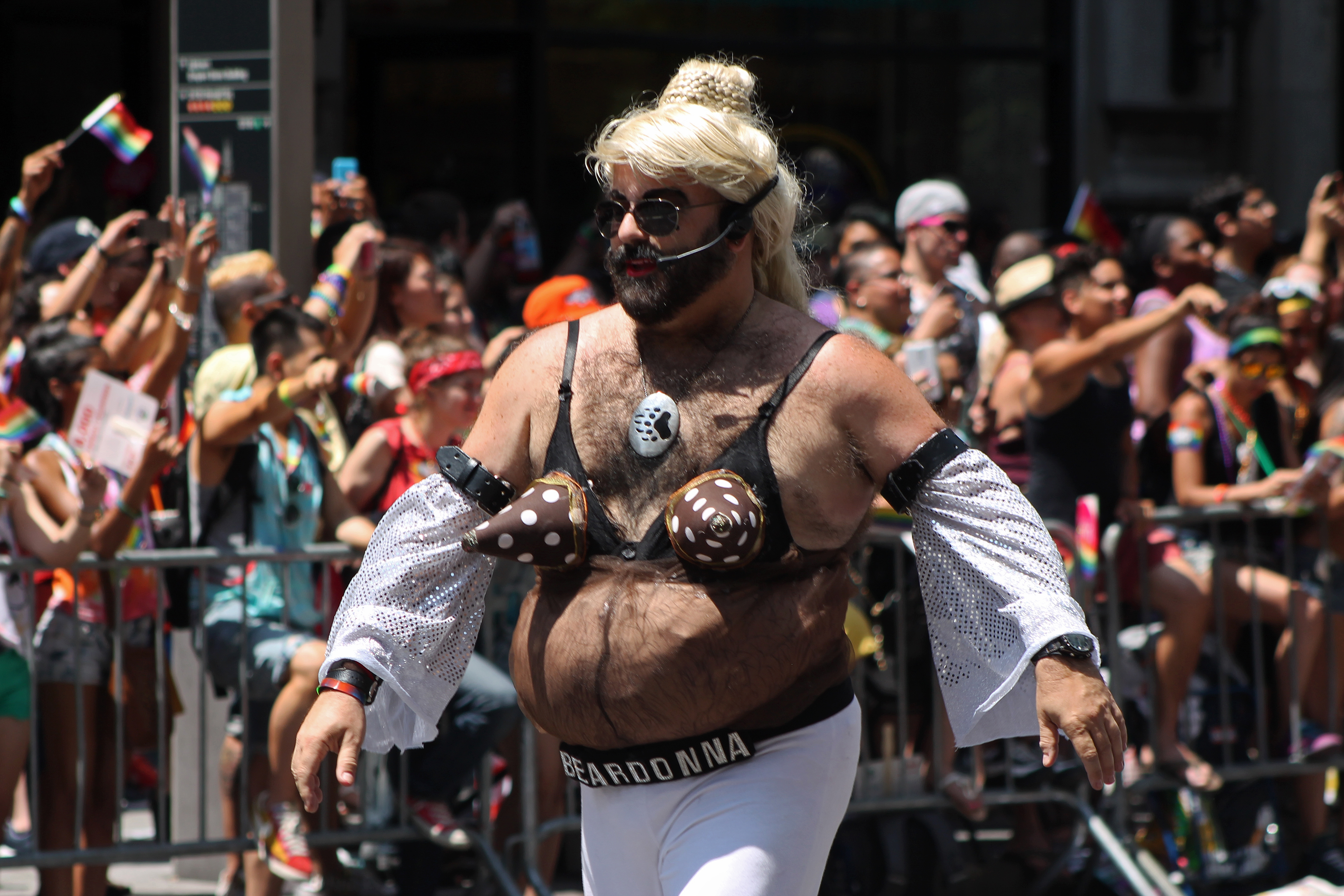
Beardonna in 2014

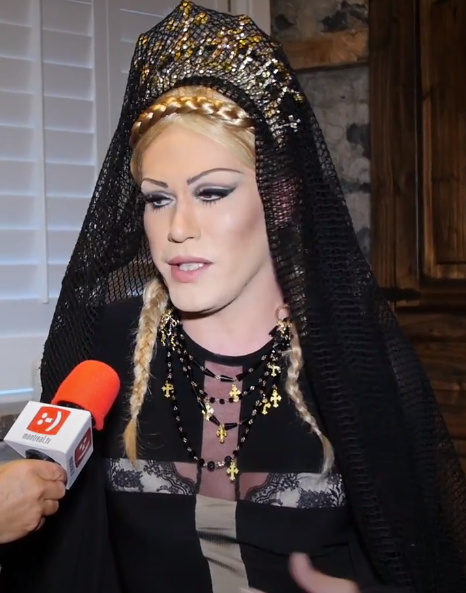
Jimmy Moore during an interview in 2018, doing Madonna

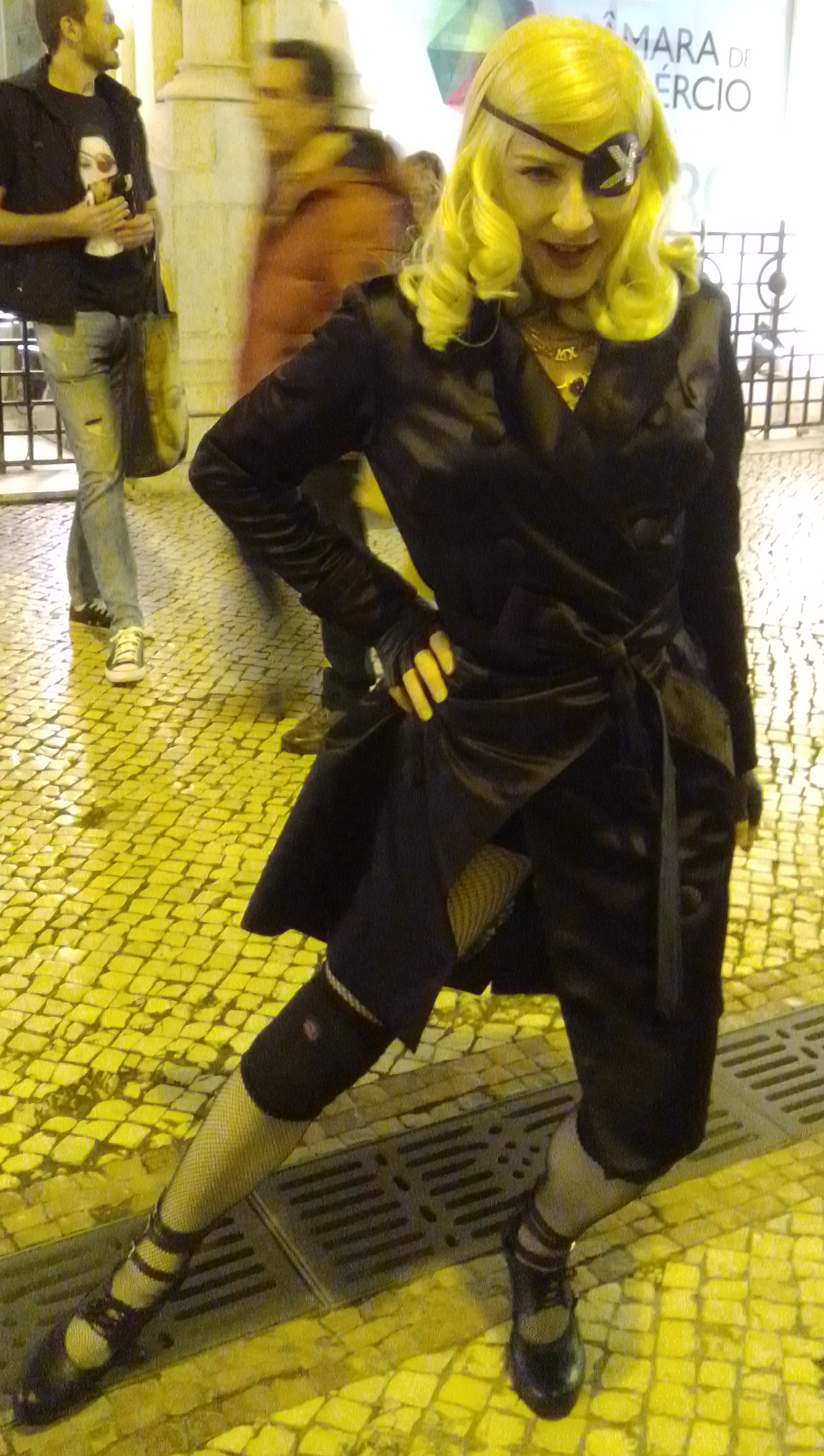
Rinaldo Borba in 2019

The following is a list of notable Madonna impersonators garnering significant press coverage:

- Chris America: She began professionally in 1984. America has performed as Madonna at venues around the world including the White House and appeared in television programs of hosts like Oprah Winfrey and various documentaries. In 2013, Meredith Hoffman from DNAinfo called her the world's "top Madonna impersonator"
- Denise Bella Vlasis: Denise began her Madonna career professionally in 1985. In 2009, Greek Reporter named her the most successful Madonna impersonator, while a contributor in The Florida Times-Union recognized her as "the top Madonna look-alike", also noting her industry forays, including founding the Tribute Productions. The Guinness World book of records recognized her in 2025 as the Madonna Impersonator with the longest career.
- Melissa Totten: She started around 1991 or 1992. In 2013, Totten released a tribute album called Forever Madonna. In 2012, The Indian Express referred to her as "arguably the best Madonna impersonator in the world". As of 2011, she visited more than 30 countries and performed front a 2 million attendance. Sometimes, Totten replaced Madonna in official events and acted as her "official double"
- Coty Alexander: According to Legends in Concert, her Madonna portrayal has been recognized by media outlets such as MTV, Travel Channel, Los Angeles Times and The New York Times among others. In 2023, The Daily News touted her as "one of the most sought-after Madonna tributes in the United States"
- "Carolina Baily" (b. Elías Figueroa): Is a cross-dresser Madonna look-alike impersonator. He is known as the "official" Chilean Madonna double. According to The West Australian, he started professionally since 2001. Baily gained nationwide attention after Madonna's first concert in Chile, Sticky & Sweet Tour in 2008, and quickly received the attention of international outlets such as Rolling Stone, Daily Mail or The Sun as well. Around this time, he had weekly performances up to three times in front of crowds of up to 20,000
- "Venus D-Lite" (b. Adam Guerra): Media outlets such as MTV and VH1 have called Guerra the number one Madonna impersonator
- Rinaldo Borba: A male impersonator, according to La Stampa is the official Madonna cosplayer in Brazil. He started in the late 1990s
- Verônica Pires: Official Brazilian impersonator approved by Warner Bros.. She started her Madonna professional career in 1990
- Jimmy Moore: Moore debuted in the industry personifying Madonna, although expanded his catalog of personifications. He has recorded approval from singer's inner circle, like her manager Guy Oseary. In 2012, Montreal Gazette headlined him as a "Fame Montreal Madonna impersonator", while another website called him the best Madonna impersonator
- Tasha Leaper: Leaper, from United Kingdom, defined herself a tribute act, rather than an impersonator. In 2019, Rachel Lopez from Hindustan Times named her "one of the most recognisable Madonna impersonators", while Carlos Sala from La Razón referred to her as "Madonna's most recognized impersonator"
- "Miss Madonna" (b. Jodie Jackson) According to The Guardian she started in 2009, and Jackson identifies herself more a tribute act rather than a look-alike. The same publication, in their 2022 article, describes she found "success", and in 2013, she was recognized in her industry as UK's number one Madonna tribute by The Agents' Association of Great Britain
- "Queerdonna" (b. Greg Tanian): Drag Madonna impersonator knew in the New York nightlife of the 1990s and for his "super-sized" 400-plus-pound weight. American journalist Michael Musto commented that "Queerdonna proves that anyone can be Madonna and, conversely, that Madonna is in everyone"
- "Beardonna": (a portmanteau of slang word bear and Madonna) is a satirical impersonation of Madonna made by Rob Donadio. Beardonna has received press citations by media outlets such as Asbury Park Press (AAP) and Philadelphia magazine, for his Madonna personification or tribute shows such as "Like a Bear"
- Sandra Amato: From Argentina, she was described by national newspaper La Nación in 1996, as an "apocryphal" and "very vernacular" version of Madonna. In 2019, she was part of the TV special program Dobles de por vida by Telefe Noticias
- "Diana Groissman" (b. Pablo Moscoso): Chilean cross-dresser Madonna impersonator, whom started in the late-1990s. He performed in several locations in Chile, and also in Argentina, and appeared in advertisements
- Johni Ray: According to a 1995 article from Nevada she started around 1987. At the time of that publication, she had visited 15 countries
- Lisa Antoinette: Madonna impersonator from the United Kingdom, was voted in her native country as "the best female pop star look-alike in the United Kingdom" according to a 2006 article of The Malta Independent
- Kelly Michaels: According to Sherilyn Connelly of SF Weekly, Kelly is known "as one of the better Madonna impersonators in the late '80s". She received media citations by publications like Icelandic newspaper Tíminn in 1991, and Connelly described her as having a "serious Madonna fixation"
- "Madiva": A MTV personality, gained a brief notoriety after being mentioned by Madonna around 2003. Her official website, Madonna.com called him "New York's most infamous Madonna impersonator"

In 1993, Los Angeles Times reported about Blond Exhibition, a group of Madonna impersonators who "do every look Madonna has ever done"

=== Others ===
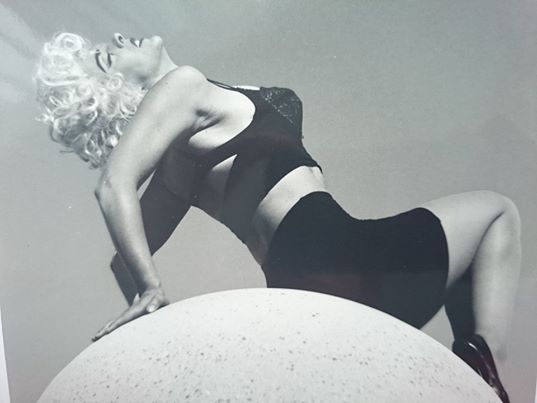
Tracey Bell as Madonna

Various full and part-time celebrities impressionists have included Madonna in their repertoire, including special segments like Nadya Ginsburg and his web series The Madonnalouges. Following a non-exhaustive list:

- Tracey Bell
- Charlie Hides
- Véronic DiCaire
- Elaine Chez
- Athena Reich
- Nadya Ginsburg
- Fátima Flórez

On the other hand, Chad Michaels known for his Cher performs, confessed he tried first to do Madonna, but was not convinced and preferred to focus on Cher.

== Impact ==
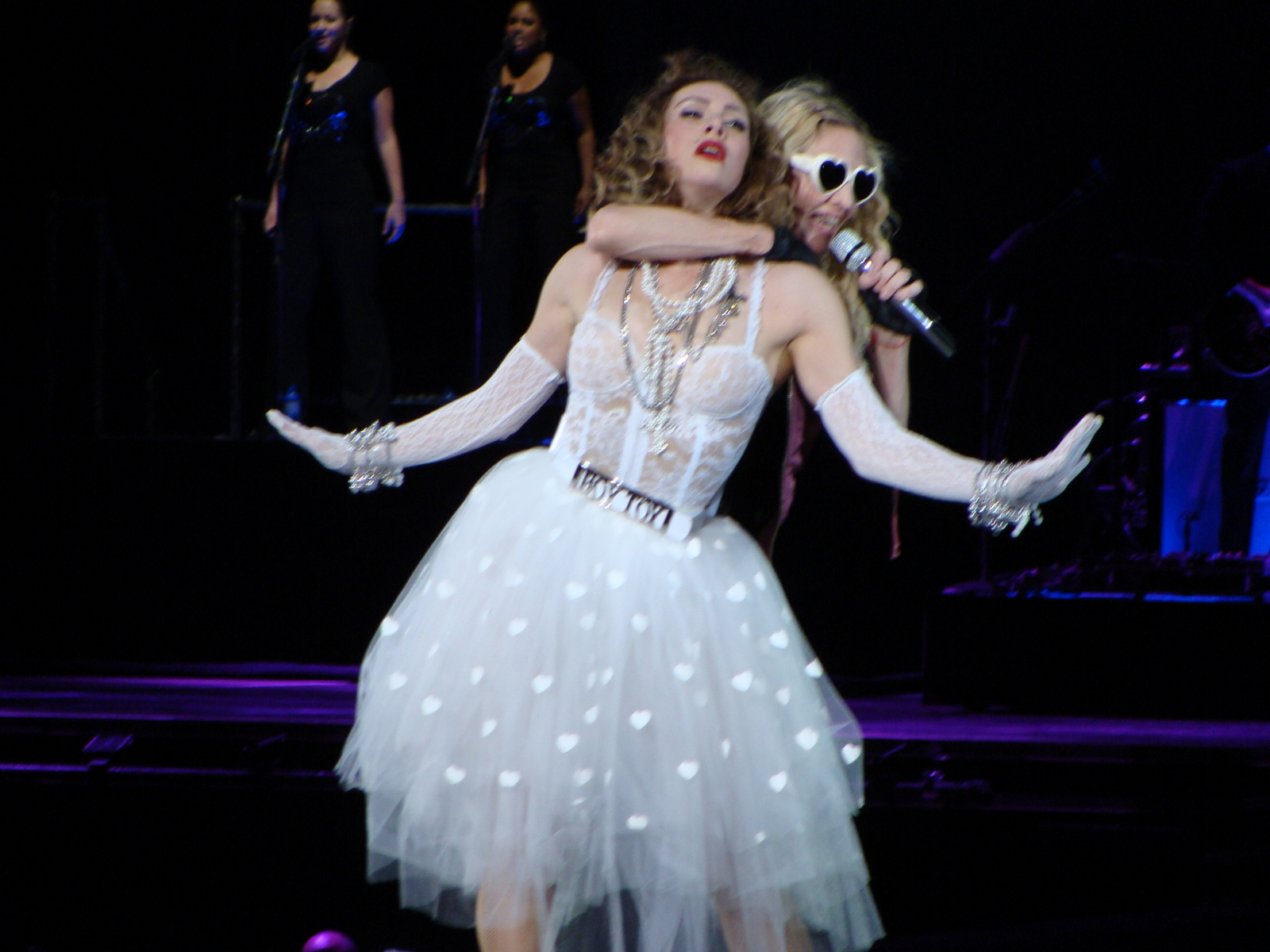
Madonna singing "She's Not Me", during the Sticky & Sweet Tour and her dancer dressed with the Like a Virgin-era style

In 1991, a Hollywood-based company of more than 30,000 look-alikes, lumped Madonna and Michael Jackson as "big moneymakers", being appeared in the top one percent requested of the company, according to Orlando Sentinel. Madonna impersonators appeared again in the annual 1993 list, within the top ten of the most requested celebrities look-alikes according to Time magazine. In 2019, Rachel Lopez from Hindustan Times commented that "for a woman tribute artist, there's probably no better muse than Madonna", adding that there are costumes, and also music, from "over three decades of chartbusters".

American journalist Ricardo Baca estimated Madonna as the most imitated woman in the world at some stage of her career. In Madonna: An Intimate Biography (2001), J. Randy Taraborrelli has concurred that she is "one of the most emulated female performers in show business history". In 2017, Spanish-language website Algarabía, included her among their list of the "most imitated celebrities in competitions, shows and television programs". Madonna was aware of being often emulated; during the promotion of her 1994 single "Secret", she shared in internet, an audio file where she recorded a part saying: "It's Madonna. Often imitated, but never duplicated". Journalists from media outlets such as Los Angeles Times and Wonderwall have used a same description. At the 1999 MTV Video Music Awards, there was a special tribute to Madonna with dozen Madonna-dressed drag queens. Her response was: "All I have to say is that it takes a real man to fill my shoes". A year prior, in 1998, "The Blonde Exhibition" was a dedicated tribute show in Las Vegas by 11 professional impersonators. In "She's Not Me", from her 2008 album Hard Candy, she explored the idea of being emulated by another woman. Finally, the world record as the largest gathering of people dressed as Madonna at the same time in a single event is 440. It occurred on 30 August 2014, by the 2014 Fool's Paradise Drag Party in Fire Island Pines, New York. This feat was listed by both Guinness World Records and World Record Academy.

=== Tributes by Madonna ===
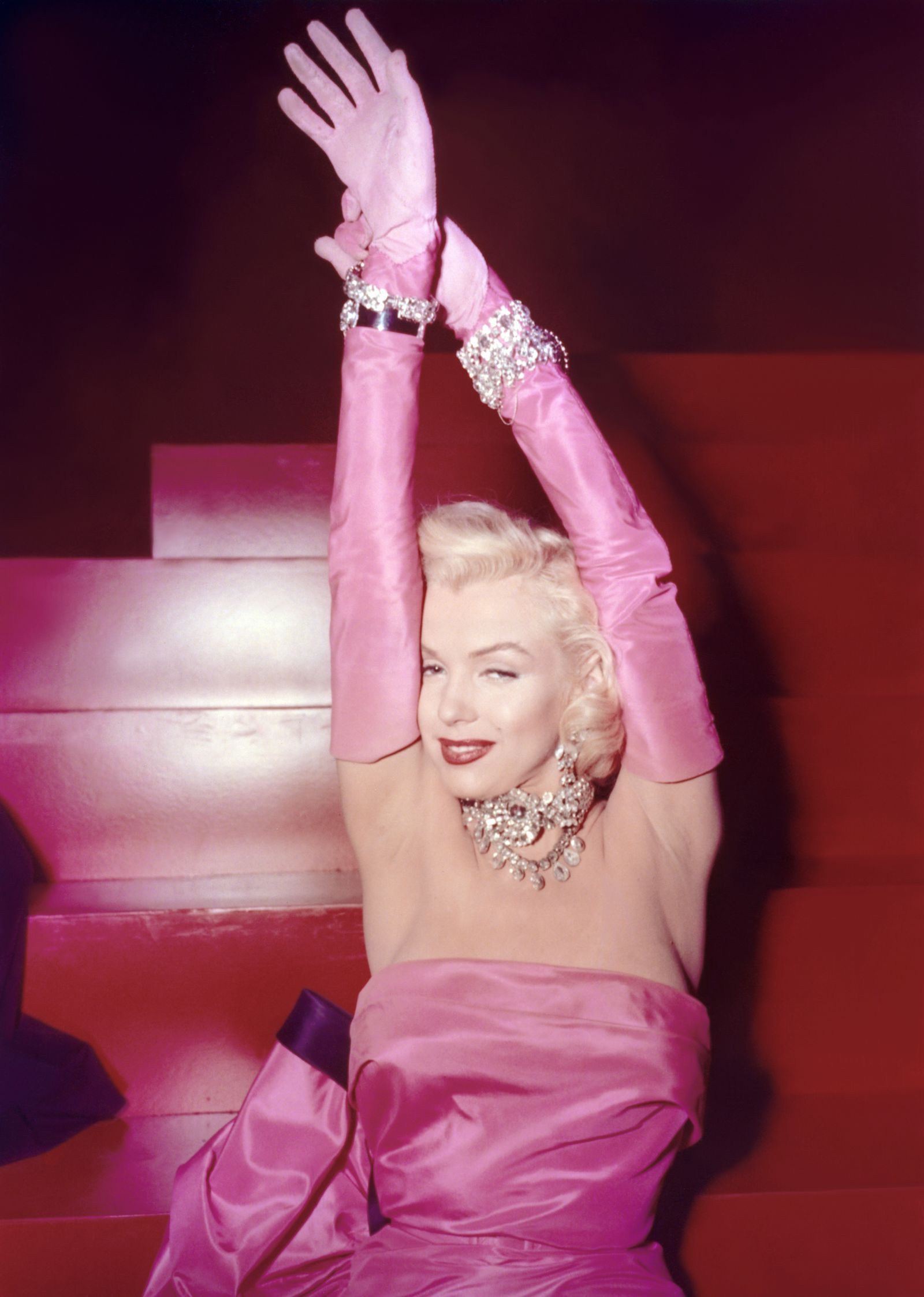
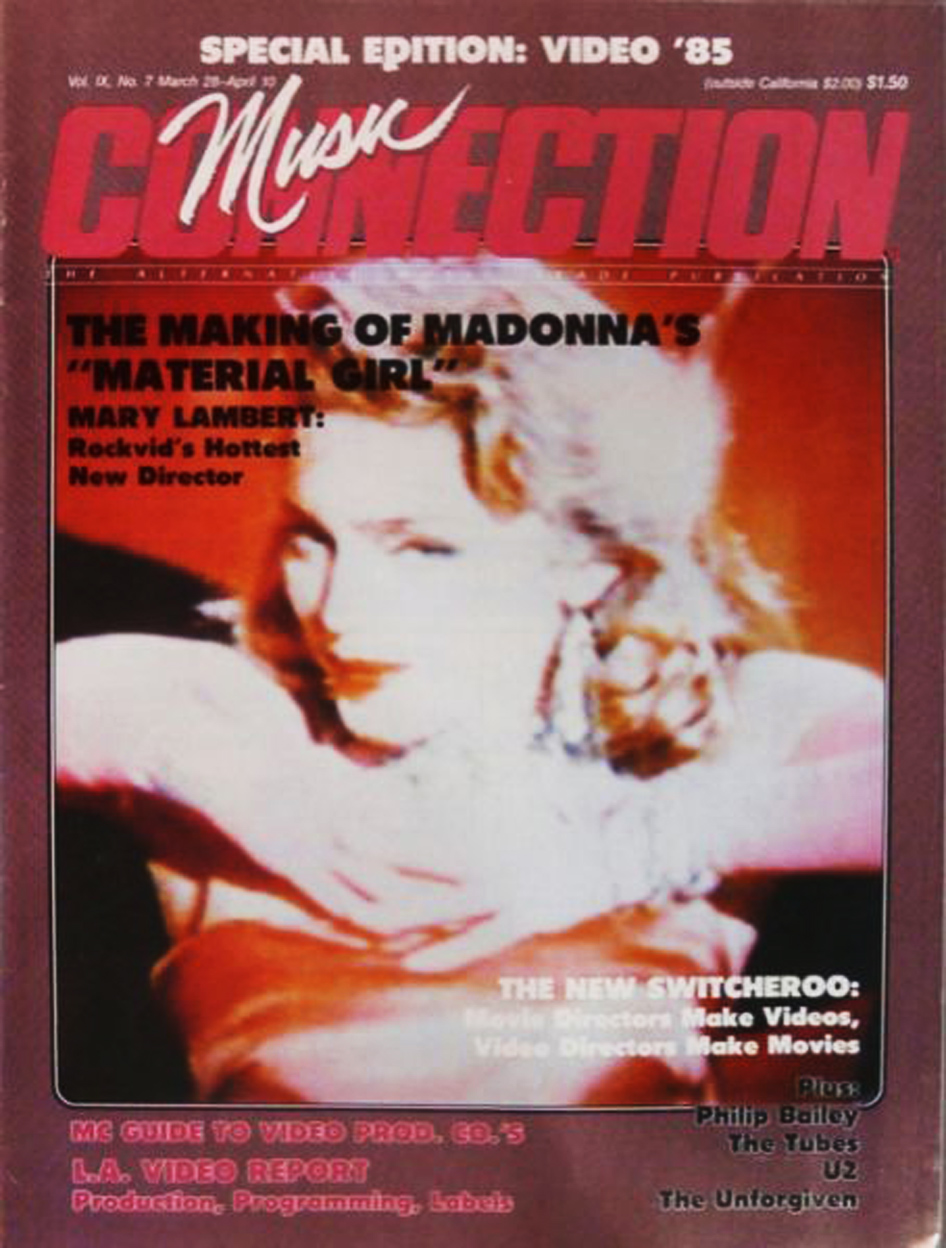
Madonna has channeled female figures such as Marilyn Monroe (left). Some noted it benefited her career, and others also noted it benefited Monroe as well.

Madonna has paid tributes to other historial and modern woman. In 2012, she told the audience during a concert of the MDNA Tour, "imitation is the highest form of flattery".

In the 1990s, a scholar described her as a "replicant" in the sense she is an "image of images, mirror of mirrors", who "re-multiplies and re-changes and dissolves itself". Most notably, she personified Marilyn Monroe with assistant professor S. Paige Baty, and historian Robert D. Richardson concluding in 1995, that she reproduces herself as Marilyn in outfits, hairstyles, and mannerisms. However, Madonna was also identified by some as the "Queen-of-Seeming-as-Being herself". In this regard, Italian professor Massimiliano Stramaglia from University of Macerata explained in 2022, that some had reported she "never stops looking like other stars, including Monroe".

Though she largely benefits from Monroe's image, others noted Madonna's impact on Monroe's image in her generation. Scholars Robert Sternberg and Aleksandra Kostić said "Madonna's TV-pictured soft-tousled blond hair popularized the sexy, Marilyn Monroe look of the 1950s". "The woman who will not die", recalled Gloria Steinem, echoing Madonna's representations of Monroe, and saying she further puts her as "an ever-present fixture in everyday American culture". Steinem also claimed she subtracted Monroe's image of "vulnerability". Similarly, in Shiny and New (2021), English journalist Dylan Jones mentioned the theme of "vulnerability" and said that she was "referenced whenever Madonna was mentioned by the press". Similar perceptions were mentioned by music critics Anthony DeCurtis in Present Tense: Rock & Roll and Culture (1992) and, Simon Frith in Sound and Vision: The Music Video Reader (1993). Some other entertainers, have channeled or have been compared to both Madonna-Marilyn Monroe styles, including Camila Cabello at the 2018 iHeartRadio Music Awards, Paris Jackson during her modelling debut in 2017, or Paris Hilton.

== See also ==
- Fashion of Madonna
- Elvis impersonator
- Michael Jackson impersonator
- Tom Jones impersonator

Some other depictions in film:

- Headcases
- Mister Lonely
- Molly

== Book sources ==
- Baty, S. Paige; Richardson, Robert D. (1995). American Monroe: The Making of a Body Politic. University of California Press. ISBN 0520088050.
- Brown, Stephen (2004). Free Gift Inside!!: Forget the Customer. Develop Marketease. John Wiley & Sons. ISBN 1-841-12602-0.
- Ching, Frank (1994). China in Transition. Review Publishing Company. ISBN 9-627-01056-1.
- Davisson, Amber L. (2013). Lady Gaga and the Remaking of Celebrity Culture. McFarland. ISBN 978-1-476-60376-6.
- DeCurtis, Anthony (1992). Present Tense: Rock & Roll and Culture. Duke University Press. ISBN 0-822-31265-4.
- Garde-Hansen, Joanne (2011). Media and Memory. Edinburgh University Press. ISBN 978-0-748-68888-3.
- Goodwin, Andrew; Grossberg, Lawrence; Frith, Simon (2005). Sound and Vision: The Music Video Reader. Taylor & Francis. ISBN 1134869231.
- Henthorne, Tom (2011). William Gibson: A Literary Companion. McFarland. ISBN 978-0-786-48693-9.
- Jones, Dylan (2021). Shiny and New: Ten Moments of Pop Genius that Defined the '80s. Orion Publishing Group. ISBN 1474620086.
- Lemebel, Pedro (1997). Loco afán: crónicas de sidario (in Spanish). LOM Ediciones. ISBN 9-567-36980-1.
- Mamonova, Tatyana; Folsom, Chandra Niles (1994). Women's Glasnost Vs. Naglost: Stopping Russian Backlash. ABC-CLIO. ISBN 0-897-89340-9.
- Martin, Philip (1997). Shortstop's Son: Essays and Journalism. University of Arkansas Press. ISBN 1-610-75379-8.
- Rieser, Klaus; Phillips, Michael W.; Fuchs, Michael (2013). Configuring America: Iconic Figures, Visuality, and the American Identity. Intellect Books. ISBN 978-1-84150-762-0.
- Samovar, Larry A.; Porter, Richard E.; McDaniel, Edwin R.; Roy, Carolyn Sexton (2014). Intercultural Communication: A Reader. Cengage Learning. ISBN 978-1-285-07739-0.
- Stępień, Justyna (2014). Redefining Kitsch and Camp in Literature and Culture. Cambridge Scholars Publishing. ISBN 978-1-443-86779-5.
- Sternberg, Robert; Kostić, Aleksandra (2022). Nonverbal Communication in Close Relationships. Springer Nature. ISBN 978-3030944926.
- Taraborrelli, J. Randy (2001). Madonna: An Intimate Biography. Simon & Schuster. ISBN 0-743-22880-4.
