= Madonna wannabe =

1980s fashion phenomenon

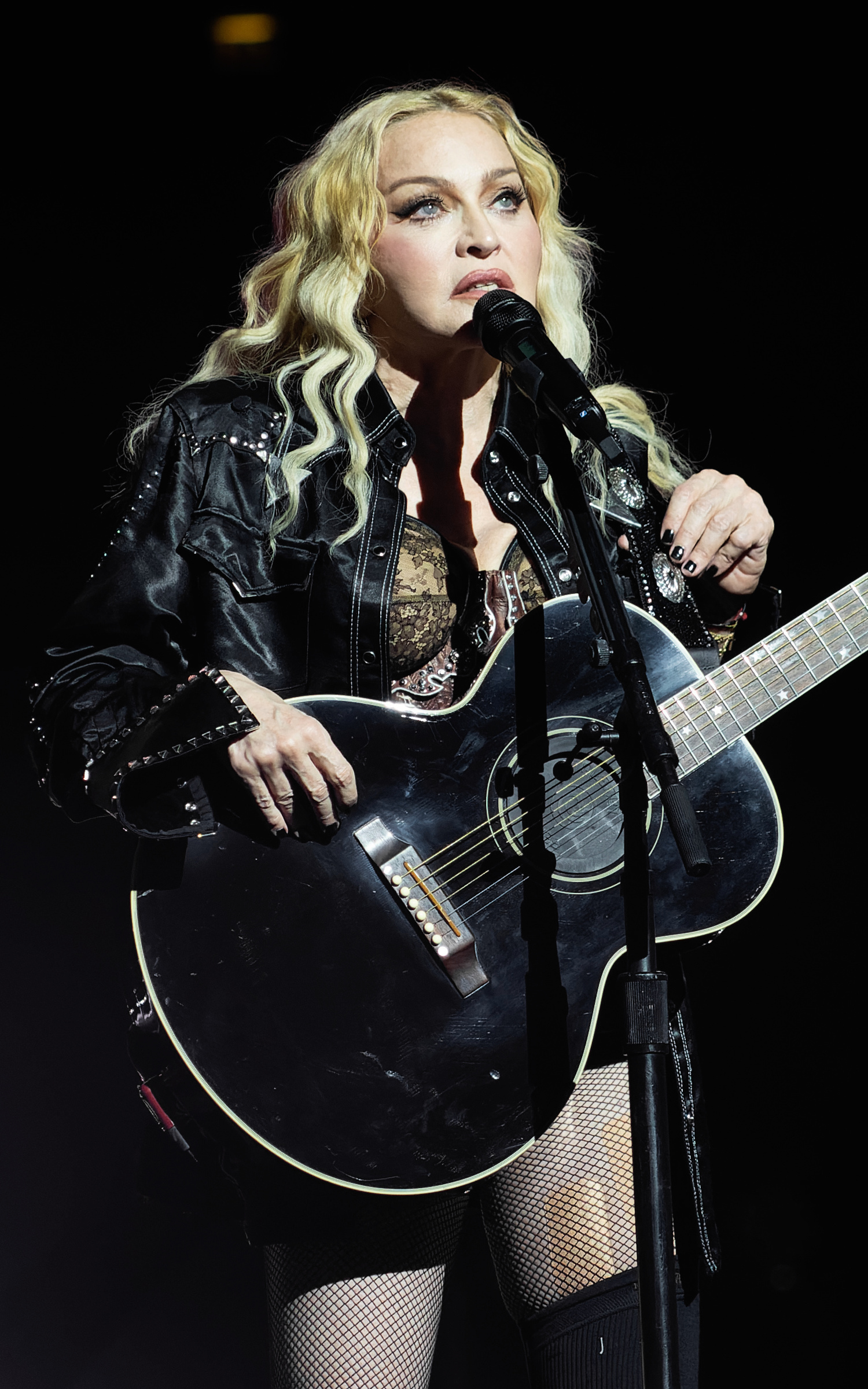
Madonna during the Celebration Tour in 2023

A Madonna wannabe, or Madonnabe, is a person (usually female) who dresses or acts like American singer Madonna. When she emerged into stardom in the mid-1980s, an unusually high number of women, particularly young women and girls, began to dress and do their hair and makeup in the style that Madonna displayed in public. The term was popularized by writer John Skow in a May 1985 Time cover story on the singer. Numerous sociologists and other academics commented on the Madonna influence in her wannabes.

The term was officially recognized by the Webster's Dictionary in May 1991. Following the disappearance of the trend, critics and journalists refer to female pop stars who emulate Madonna's clothing or musical style as Madonna wannabes. The term is also used as a nickname for her fandom, mainly to refer to her female fans, especially young ones.

== History ==
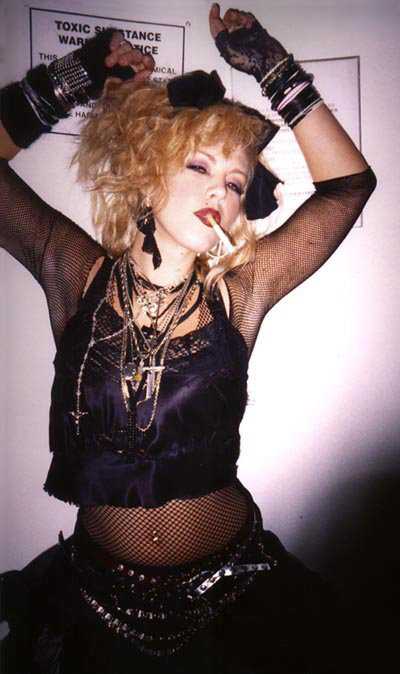
A woman dressed in the Madonna's look and style of the wannabe era

In 1982, Madonna met French jewelry designer Maripol at the Roxy nightclub in New York City. Both Madonna and Maripol styled the looks of her first two albums, Madonna (1983) and Like a Virgin (1984). The French designer made a line of official Madonna jewelry and accessories for her Virgin Tour in 1985, while the singer herself briefly sold a line of her own punk-chic clothing, called Yazoo, at Maripol's Bleecker Street shop.

Some authors placed her video "Lucky Star" from her debut album as the beginning of the style and fad. According to professor Santiago Fouz-Hernandez and author of Madonna's Drowned Worlds (2004), following the Virgin Tour, Madonna was immediately imitated by girls, and audience seemed to consist mainly of wannabes and look-alikes. By this time, it was common to see young women across the world dressed in the style affected by Madonna. John Skow from Time commented on the phenomenon:

"The bright side of this trend is that these Wanna Be's (as in "We wanna be like Madonna!") could be out somewhere stealing hubcaps. Instead, all of them, hundreds of thousands of young blossoms whose actual ages run from a low of about eight to a high of perhaps 25, are saving up their baby-sitting money to buy cross-shaped earrings and fluorescent rubber bracelets like Madonna's, white lace tights that they will cut off at the ankles and black tube skirts that, out of view of their parents, they will roll down several turns at the waist to expose their middles and the waistbands of the pantyhose."

The style has been described as a thrift shop and "flash-trash" look. It typically incorporated many beads, lace tops, bleached hair, ratted hair, rosaries, crucifixes, skirts, bracelets, bustiers and other underwear as outerwear elements, fingerless gloves, as well as ribbon or bow-shaped headbands or tiaras in the hair, called Madonna bows. The fad peaked in 1985 and began to decline by that year's end, as Madonna's national tour wound down. Though the mania subsided, many women continued to wear the look and some features of the Madonna wannabe style for a number of years.

== Reactions ==
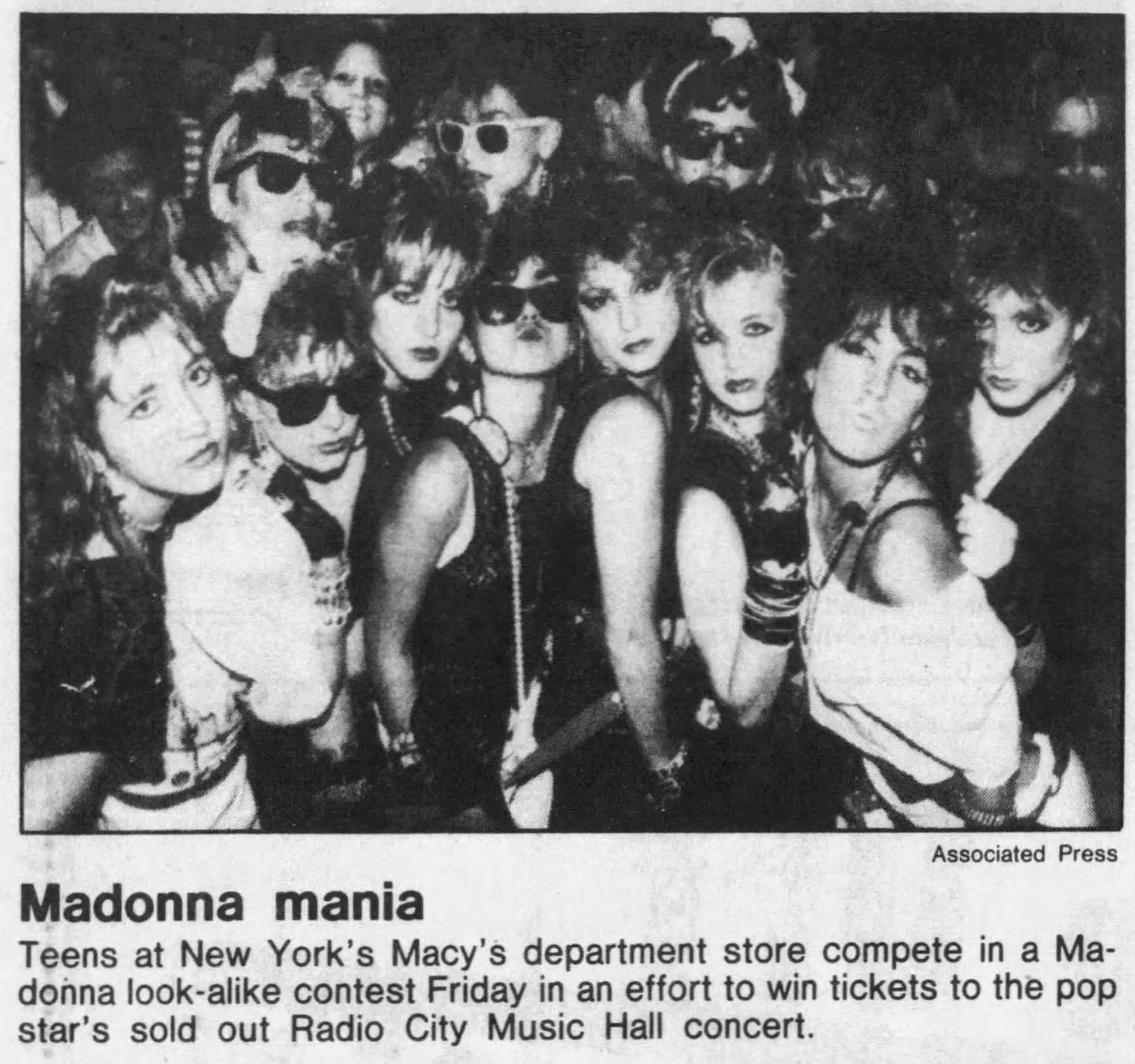
Newspaper clipping, June 9, 1985

The trend impacted retailers and also costume contests of that era, thus Madonna's trademark look became an iconic fashion trend of the 1980s. Macy's, opened their "Madonnaland" in 1985, a boutique selling clothes modelled after the singer's style. In June 1985, there was a look-alike contest at Macy's Herald Square in New York City. Pop artist Andy Warhol, who Madonna had met through her relationship with artist Jean-Michel Basquiat, her stylist Maripol, MTV contributor Nina Blackwood, and Madonna: Lucky Star author Michael McKenzie were the judges. After its launch of "Madonnaland" by Macy's, many other retailers followed suit.

In the TV program The 80's: The Decade that Made Us by the National Geographic, it was explained that "Madonna inspires countless girls across the globe to hit the nearest shopping mall to match her distinctive style". Editors of Garb: A Fashion and Culture Reader (2008), described the target as "an immense following of copycat teenagers", and it led to American journalist Ricardo Baca call her "the most imitated woman" in the world. It was described the fad was seem to be "everywhere", and a mall was dubbed "Madonna Mall" because of the many girls who shopped there. Author Jennifer Grayer Moore, wrote in Fashion Fads Through American History (2015): "The Madonna Wannabe phenomenon demonstrates the power of a mass-media personality to set a style and impact the fashion industry both by offering licensed products and by stimulating the sale of mainstream items".

Chuck Klosterman notes while girls dressed like Madonna, "she never demanded them to do so". Madonna reacted to this trend, and revealed in an interview with The Washington Post her own surprise for this phenomenon at the fact that a way of dressing she had chosen had suddenly become, quite spontaneously in fashion. In another interview with Michael Gross in 1985, she revealed: "I was flattered that people wanted to look like me and dress me. But I think it was all part of a spirit that I had, and I think that the people who wanted to dress like me saw the humor more than anybody else".

=== Impact on young female audiences ===
The Madonna wannabe phenomenon was studied by sociologists and other academics, as was noted by Spanish professor and philosopher Ana Marta González. Young female audiences were the main target impacted by this trend. French scholar Georges-Claude Guilbert described her influence on wannabes as notably "deep" to the point "have undoubtedly influenced the decisions of many young women". According to Lisa Lewis, for many young girls, imitating Madonna meant creating a space and identity of their own. By this time, using fashion and identity was a fresh concept, which according to Dawn Currie in Girl Talk (1999), coincided with the emergence of the "attitude dressing". Author Gary Goshgarian found that John Fiske and others interviewed young girls and find that the "Madonna wannabes are most taken with her assertive self-enjoyment, her seeming indifference to men".

In the journal Frontiers: A Journal of Women Studies (2001) from University of Colorado, an individual described: "Behaving like Madonna was a political statement for most of us. However, such statements we believed needed to be expressed with appropriate clothing. This quest for Madonna-ness, almost down to the bones, provoked a consumerist desire in most of us, prompting periodic excursions to the mall to update our wardrobes to keep up with the ever-changing fashion statements of Madonna". Madonna herself, commented on this: "Maybe kids now see someone in the public eye doing what I do. Maybe that's the phenomenon and why young girls are dressing up like me—because finally someone else is showing that it's O.K." "She projected an image of independence and of being unafraid to ask for what she wanted", wrote Frank Northern Magill discussing why many young girls wanted to emulate her. Retrospectively, British fashion journalist Lauren Cochrane, wrote in 2016, "it was an impulse that they acted on for many decades".

== Continuity with the term ==
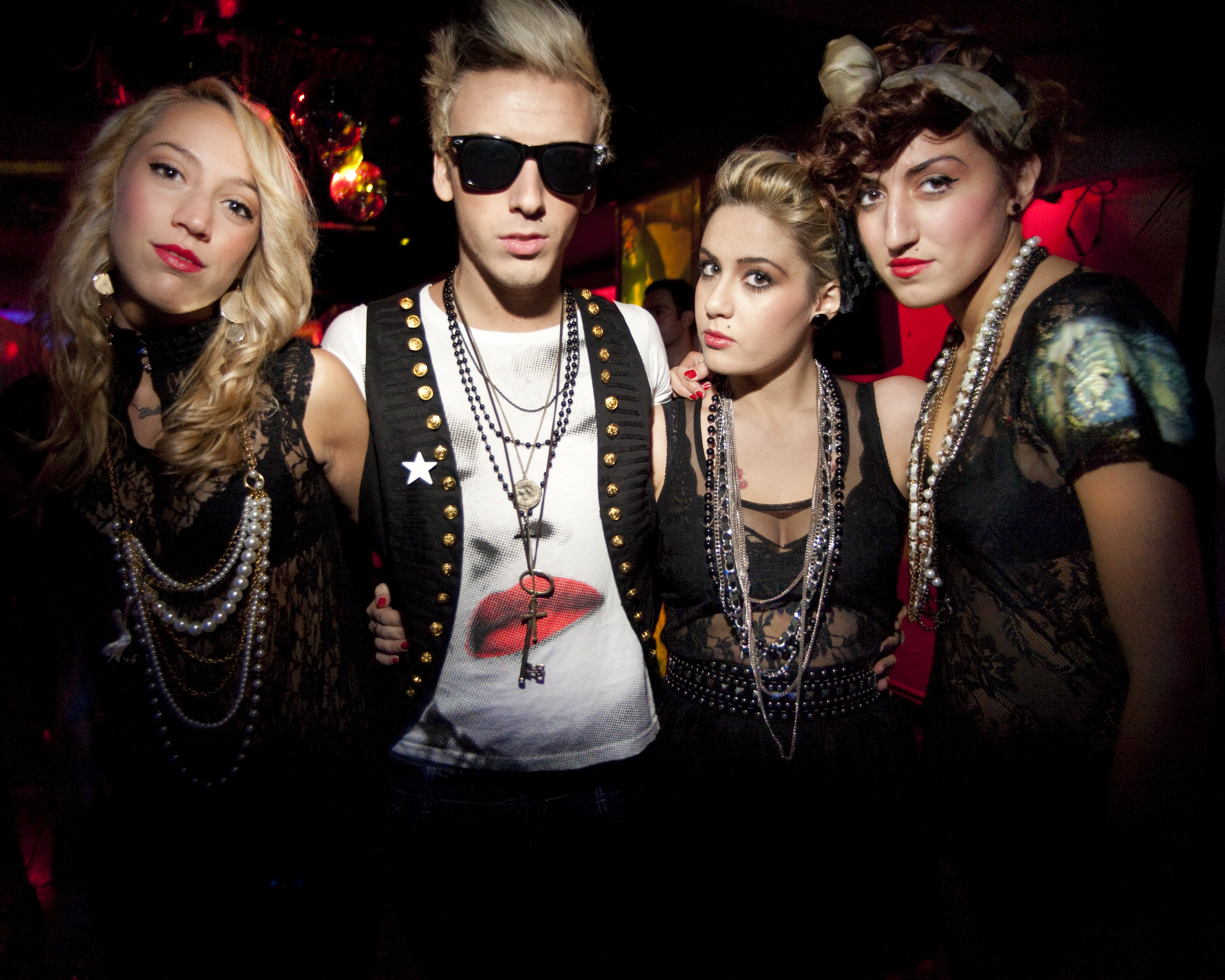
Her fandom, mainly female audience, was nicknamed also Madonna wannabes by diverse outlets.

Following the disappearance of the trend, critics and public used the term to refer female pop stars who had notable similarity with or majorly influenced by Madonna. When inducting Madonna into the Rock and Roll Hall of Fame, American singer and actor Justin Timberlake stated that "The world has always been full of Madonna wannabes, and I might have even dated a couple", referring to his former girlfriend, Britney Spears. William Anthony Donohue, the president of the Catholic League for Religious and Civil Rights, called Lady Gaga a mediocre "Madonna wannabe" for her usage of Catholic imagery in her "Alejandro" music video. A 2012 Star Tribune article ranked several singers as Madonna wannabees, including Britney Spears, Christina Aguilera, Katy Perry, Rihanna, and Lady Gaga, who topped the list.

Some media outlets and authors have referred to her fandom, mainly young, female audiences as "Madonna wannabes". According to Sean MacLeod, author of Leaders of the Pack (2015), Spice Girls's debut single "Wannabe" was coined from the fans of Madonna, who were dubbed "wannabes".

== See also ==
- Fashion of Madonna
- Madonna impersonator
- Madonna and religion; religious criticisms

== Bibliography ==
- Burns, Gary (2016). A Companion to Popular Culture. John Wiley & Sons. ISBN 978-1405192057.
- Brown, Stephen (2004). Free Gift Inside!!: Forget the Customer. Develop Marketease. John Wiley & Sons. ISBN 1841126020.
- Cross, Mary (2007). Madonna: A Biography. Greenwood Publishing Group. ISBN 978-0-313-33811-3.
- Currie, Dawn (1999). Girl Talk: Adolescent Magazines and Their Readers. University of Toronto Press. ISBN 0802082173.
- Dickinson, Kay (2003). Movie Music, the Film Reader. Routledge. ISBN 0415281598.
- Edwards, Elizabeth; Bhaumik, Kaushik (2008). Visual Sense: A Cultural Reader. Berg Publishers. ISBN 978-1845207410.
- Giuntini, Parme P.; Hagen, Kathryn (2008). Garb: A Fashion and Culture Reader. Pearson Prentice Hall. ISBN 978-0131119109.
- González, Ana Marta [in Spanish] (2009). Ficción e identidad. Ensayos de cultura postmoderna. Ediciones Rialp. ISBN 978-8432137280.
- Goshgarian, Gary (1993). The Contemporary Reader. HarperCollins. ISBN 0673522229.
- Guilbert, Georges-Claude (2002). Madonna As Postmodern Myth: How One Star's Self-Construction Rewrites Sex, Gender, Hollywood and the American Dream. McFarland & Company. ISBN 0-7864-1408-1.
- Klosterman, Chuck (2007). Fargo Rock City: A Heavy Metal Odyssey in Rural North Dakota. Scribner. ISBN 978-1416589525.
- MacLeod, Sean (2015). Leaders of the Pack: Girl Groups of the 1960s and Their Influence on Popular Culture in Britain and America. Rowman & Littlefield. ISBN 978-1442252028.
- Mansour, David (2011). From Abba to Zoom: A Pop Culture Encyclopedia of the Late 20th Century. Andrews McMeel Publishing. ISBN 978-0740793073.
- Moore, Jennifer Grayer (2015). Fashion Fads Through American History: Fitting Clothes into Context: Fitting Clothes into Context. ABC-CLIO. ISBN 978-1610699020.
