= D-lite =

D-lite may refer to:

- Deee-Lite, US pop group
- Venus D-Lite, American drag queen
