= My Strange Addiction =

American documentary television series

- Genre: Documentary
- Country of origin: United States
- Original language: English
- No. of seasons: 7
- No. of episodes: 52 (+ 1 pilot + 2 specials)

Production
- Running time: 43 minutes
- Production companies: 20 West Productions (seasons 1–4); Violet Media (seasons 5–6); Exit Four (seasons 7–present)

Original release
- Network: TLC
- Release: December 29, 2010 – February 4, 2015
- Release: January 7, 2026 – present

My Strange Addiction is an American documentary television series that premiered on TLC on December 29, 2010. The pilot was broadcast on May 5, 2010. The series focuses on people with unusual compulsive behaviors ranging from eating specific non-food items, to ritualistic daily activities, to bizarre personal fixations or beliefs.

== Overview ==
Despite the title of the show, few of the show's subjects have what would medically be classified as true addiction, neither conventional (substance-related) nor behavioral. Rather, the cause of their behavior varies and may include a variety of psychiatric diagnosis. Examples of disorders on the show are: obsessive-compulsive disorder, pica, paraphilia, schizophrenia, psychosis, Alzheimer's disease, exercise bulimia, trichotillomania, body dysmorphic disorder, dermatillomania, and object sexuality. Many of the behaviors shown are harmful.

== Episodes ==
=== Season 1 (2010–11) ===
No. overall	No. in season	Title	Original release date
0	0	"Pilot"	May 5, 2010
This pilot profiles four addicts – a compulsive runner, an excessive tanner, a shopaholic, and a chalk eater – and examines how their addictions are slowly taking over their lives.
1	1	"Eats Toilet Paper / Blow Dryer"	December 29, 2010
Lori of Austin, Texas has been addicted to sleeping with a running hair dryer since she was eight years old. Although she finds the heat and sound comforting, Lori risks the chance of burning her skin severely or, even worse, starting an electrical fire. Sleeping with a blow dryer has ended Lori's marriage to her husband, Cambrick, and her three-year-old daughter, Andrea, has picked up her behavior. Meanwhile, outside Chicago, Illinois, Kesha has admitted to eating half a roll of toilet paper every day since she was 11 years old. No matter where she goes, she seizes every opportunity to give into her addiction.
2	2	"Thumb Sucker / Bodybuilder"	December 29, 2010
In Orange County, California, professional bodybuilder Lauren Powers used to be addicted to drugs and alcohol, but now she has turned to her career in weight-lifting to replace her old addiction. She works out up to six hours a day, six days a week, complementing her physical regimen with bottles of supplements and powders, and topping it off with injections of Human Growth Hormone, putting herself at risk for kidney failure. Rhonda of Richmond, Virginia has not been able to grow out of her thumb-sucking habit, and the safety and comfort it gave her during her parents' divorce has now become an isolating social behavior she cannot let go.
3	3	"Eats Cleanser / Tanner"	January 5, 2011
Crystal has been eating household cleanser everyday since she was twelve. Her shame, embarrassment, and concern for her health have caused her to keep this a secret. Samantha tans up to three times a day in tanning beds, in addition to tanning outdoors slathered in vegetable oil.
4	4	"Ventriloquist / Cat Lady"	January 5, 2011
When April's fiancé gave her the ultimatum "it's me or the puppets" – April chose the puppets. Not only do the puppets go everywhere she goes, she practices with them 12 hours a day. Debbie is severely allergic to cats, but has over twenty of them. Despite the health problems they cause and the isolation that comes along with being the "crazy cat lady", Debbie continues to choose the cats over herself since her husband's death.
5	5	"Eats Detergent / Strongman"	January 12, 2011
Most college students listen to music or hang out with friends to deal with stress, but Tempestt eats detergent up to seven times a day, not to mention the soap she eats in the shower. Despite being taken away from a contest in an ambulance, Jeff trains for Strongman competitions up to six hours a day. Not only are the physical ramifications like chronic back pain and torn muscles not a deterrent for Jeff, his mother worries that her son has taken his exercise regimen to the extreme.
6	6	"Hair Puller / Shoe Fanatic"	January 12, 2011
Rebeca worries about her shoes when they are away from her. She believes all of her two hundred plus pairs have feelings, and she calls them her babies. The rush she gets from shopping and the comfort her shoes have given her since she was a little girl make this habit more than just a fashion accessory. Haley has been pulling her hair for over six years, but the big payoff for her is eating the follicle. Sometimes the hair pulling can trap her in the bathroom for 2–3 hours a day, literally isolating her from the world.
7	7	"Eats Couch Cushion / Furry"	January 19, 2011
Lauren can't imagine going to a party or social event without wearing her fursuit. She's completely dedicated to her "fursona" – designing and sewing her costume well into the night; it even takes priority over finding a job. Adele has been eating couch cushions for twenty years. When feelings of stress and anxiety come up, she literally stuffs them back down with couch cushion.
8	8	"Married to a Doll / Picking My Scabs"	January 25, 2011
Davecat treats his RealDoll like a human wife. He eats meals with her, shops for her, dresses her, and is convinced she returns the same type of affection. Rachael is addicted to picking her scabs. What started out in childhood has manifested into an addiction that can occupy her time up to two hours a day. Now, family members, along with her fiancé, are worried her obsession could become a serious threat to her life.
9	9	"Can't Stop Cleaning / Love Rocks"	February 2, 2011
Cyntrelle isn't a cleaning lady, but she spends 8 hours every day aggressively scrubbing, washing, and polishing her home, leaving her with no time left in the day for a job or a social life. Her compulsion to clean not only controls her life, but disrupts the entire household, causing her to explode anytime her cleaning standards are not upheld by the whole family. It sounds harmless, but rock collecting endangers Belinda's life. When she's out "rocking", she falls into a trancelike state, losing her sense of time and throwing caution to the wind. She'll trek through treacherous terrain and wander through dangerous neighborhoods – all to find the "perfect" rock.
10	10	"Eats Glass / Bleaches Skin"	February 9, 2011
Josh enjoys a glass of champagne, not for the bubbly contents, but for the satisfying crunch of the glass as he bites into it. Over the past four years, he has consumed more than 100 glasses and 250 light bulbs. As if ingesting glass wasn't dangerous enough, Josh also swallows live bullets, up to 30 in one sitting. His fiancée is obviously concerned about the physical risks of his behavior, but Josh loves the attention this shocking habit brings him and has no plans to stop. Candice struggles with her addiction to skin bleach to lighten her skin. Discrimination at school and teasing from friends has her convinced she is ugly. She calls her obsession a beauty regimen, but her family insists it's an addiction and worries about the health risks, including skin cancer.
11	11	"Make-Up Addict / Obsessed with Death"	February 9, 2011
According to Maureen's family and friends, her over-the-top makeup makes her look like a clown. She is obsessed with her makeup, wearing it 24/7 even when she sleeps, and disregarding the damaging effects it is having on her skin. She can't bear the thought of being seen without it and has considered making it permanent with facial tattoos. Most people avoid the foreboding gloom of a cemetery, but this is where Barbara is most at peace. Since a series of tragic losses in her life, Barbara has been fascinated with the "other side", preferring to spend her time in the company of those who have passed on, and looking forward to the time when she can join them. She's planned all of the details of her own funeral, up to the tiniest detail of writing her own eulogy.
12	12	"Laxatives / Pottery & Ashes"	February 16, 2011
What started as a way to lose the freshman fifteen, has turned into a life-threatening laxative addiction for Kimberly. In the five years since she started taking hundreds of laxatives a day, she has been hospitalized with bleeding ulcers and malnutrition. Bianca, who occasionally ate dirt as a child, now craves pottery and ashes more than food or water. When Bianca says, "that cigarette looks really good", she means she wants to eat the ashes, not take a drag. Her unusual appetite not only threatens her health, but is also starting to influence her son, who wants to eat pottery just like his mother.

=== Season 2 (2011) ===
No. overall	No. in season	Title	Original release date
13	1	"Rampant Rats / Extreme Fingernails"	July 17, 2011
Jazz has been growing her fingernails for the past 22 years. Her longest nail is 24 inches and growing. Everyday tasks such as typing on a keyboard, brushing her teeth, or tying her shoes seem daunting. Even though her extreme fingernails make life tough, Jazz refuses to cut her nails. Theresa is addicted to her 52 hairless rats. Instead of working, she spends her day feeding, cleaning and caring for her strange obsession. Her studio apartment is crammed full of cages and her only daughter refuses to spend time with her because of her addiction. Despite threats from her daughter to cut off contact completely, Theresa won’t give up her hairless rats.
14	2	"Eats Dry Wall / Shower Drain Hair Collector"	July 17, 2011
Evan enjoys pulling hair from shower drains. In social situations, he heads straight to the bathroom and compulsively pulls hair out of the homeowner's shower drain. The ritual relieves his anxiety, but the addiction leaves him feeling ashamed. Evan fears the compulsion will take over his life, but doesn't know if he can stop. For the past seven years, Nicole has been eating the drywall. She craves the taste and will eat up to three square feet of drywall every week. The walls in her home are covered in holes from snacking, serving as a constant reminder of her addiction. Nicole knows she could be causing permanent damage to her body, but isn’t sure she can quit.
15	3	"Adult Baby / Eats Dryer Sheets"	July 24, 2011
Riley lives her life as an adult baby and refuses to grow up. She sleeps in a crib, drinks out of a bottle, and even wears diapers 24 hours a day. Despite her friends concern that she’s missing out on life, Riley refuses to change her ways. Charmissa has been addicted to chewing dryer sheets for four years. She wraps them up in toilet paper and tears off a piece when she has a craving. Chewing on them helps to calm her nerves, but the chemicals in the dryer sheets can cause cancer. Charmissa has no idea what she has done to her body and desperately wants to stop so she can be there for her three young children.
16	4	"Gas Sniffer / Teddy Bear Obsessions"	July 24, 2011
For the past 30 years, Theresa has been sniffing gasoline out of a water bottle. Her addiction has gotten so bad that she can’t go more than ten minutes without a sniff. She even wakes up in the middle of the night for a good sniff. Theresa suffers from memory loss, stomach problems and anemia, but still refuses to quit. Her family is scared for her health and desperately wants her to get help. Krista is a loving mother to her 12 teddy bears. Krista tends to her troop of teddy bears as any mother would: dressing them, caring for them and putting them to bed every day. She often talks more to her teddy bears than to her own boyfriend. Krista doesn’t think of her behavior as a problem, but her friends and family are sick of the bears coming before them.
17	5	"Extreme Cycling / Taxidermy"	July 31, 2011
Tom is a 55-year-old avid cycler who spends over six hours a day pedaling. Despite warnings from his doctor about the effects of cycling on his body, he cannot seem to give it up. Divya is a 28-year-old taxidermy enthusiast who spends many days and nights combing the sides of the road for dead animals. Her friends and family are concerned about the ill effects on her health, but she thinks they are overreacting.
18	6	"Eats Rocks / Pillow Obsessed"	July 31, 2011
Theresa has been eating rocks for more than 20 years and can't stop. Meanwhile, Tamara carries around her childhood pillow Boo everywhere she goes.
19	7	"Bathes in Bleach / Eats Plastic"	August 7, 2011
Kailyn has eaten plastic every day for more than eleven years – remote controls, CD cases, forks, and water bottles are some of her favorites. She eats up to 15 pieces of plastic a day and even chooses plastic over food. Gloria has taken her addiction to bleach to the extreme – she bathes in it daily, pours it on her hand to smell while she’s out and will even tear into bottles at the store so she can get a quick fix. Her family and friends think this strange addiction is taking over her life, but Gloria can’t imagine a life without her bleach.
20	8	"Carrying My Husband's Urn"	August 7, 2011
Casie has been so devastated by the sudden loss of her husband, Shawn, that she brings his urn with her wherever she goes. Her family is worried about her well-being, but does not know that Casie has taken her addiction to a shocking new extreme and is now eating his ashes. Although her family is concerned for her health and her well-being, she refuses to stop her behavior.

=== Season 3 (2012) ===
No. overall	No. in season	Title	Original release date
21	1	"Dating My Car / Baby Powder Addiction"	February 12, 2012
Jaye has been addicted to sniffing baby powder for over 16 years, which is now causing internal damage. Nathaniel admits to dating his car "Chase" for almost five years, even taking it out on dates and becoming intimate with it.
22	2	"Eats Cat Food / Smells Mothballs"	February 12, 2012
Mary, who can't stop herself from consuming snacks as well as canned food intended for cats, consumes over 900 treats a day. Alicia, addicted to smelling mothballs, keeps them stashed all over her house and even in her purse for emergencies.
23	3	"Addicted to My Breasts / Tape Eater"	February 19, 2012
Having spent $250,000 on 22 breast enhancement surgeries, Sheyla Hershey needs help overcoming the addiction that has left her with a 38KKK-sized chest and a life-threatening infection. Andrea must overcome consuming adhesive tape every day.
24	4	"Drinks Nail Polish / Ear Digger"	February 19, 2012
Jamie needs help to stop the habit of constantly picking at her own ears. Bertha's family desperately seeks treatment for their daughter who they fear is causing damage to her body.
25	5	"Eats Dirt / Extreme Toenails"	March 4, 2012
Kristie of Vancouver, Washington eats dirt. Ayanna of Houston, Texas obsessively grows her finger nails and toenails.
26	6	"Smells Pine Cleaner / Roadkill Addict"	March 4, 2012
Woman sniffs pine cleaner. Man collects roadkill and gives them proper burials.
27	7	"Drinks Gasoline / Smelling Her Doll Head"	March 11, 2012
Shannon, of Welland, Ontario, can't stop drinking gasoline. Lacey, of Washington, D.C., is obsessed with her doll head, "Susie Q."
28	8	"Urine Drinker"	March 18, 2012
A woman drinks her own urine as cancer treatment, but her daughters urge her to see a doctor.

=== Season 4 (2013) ===
No. overall	No. in season	Title	Original release date
29	1	"Addicted to Coffee Enemas / Licks Cats"	February 13, 2013
Trina and her husband Mike have done nearly 7,000 coffee enemas over the last two and a half years. Lisa has been addicted to licking her cat and eating clumps of hair for fifteen years.
30	2	"Addicted to Inflatables / Butt Injection Addict"	February 13, 2013
For the last six years, Mark has been addicted to his 15 inflatable pool toys as he eats with them, sleeps with them, and even bathes them. Karmello has been getting black market butt injections for the last three years.
31	3	"Extreme Hair / Addicted to Bee Stings"	February 20, 2013
Asha hasn't cut her 21-foot-long hair for nearly 25 years and spends up to six hours a day grooming her 10-pound locks. Margaret has stung herself more than 50,000 times with bees.
32	4	"Loves Baby Wipes / Eats Sand"	February 20, 2013
Riah has been addicted to baby wipes since she was 15 and goes through 500 a day, using them instead of showering. Brea has been addicted to eating sand for the past five years.
33	5	"The Lamb / Eats Deodorant"	February 27, 2013
Nicole has been addicted to eating deodorant for two years, consuming 15 sticks per month. Audrey can't live without her stuffed lamb.
34	6	"Vapor Rub / Eats Tires"	March 6, 2013
Danielle has been addicted to vapor rub for more than 20 years, going through more than 30 jars, inhalers, and patches every week. Allison has been eating tires for the past six years, consuming 14 pounds every month.
35	7	"In Love with Balloons / Face Mask Eater"	March 13, 2013
Julius has been sexually attracted to balloons for decades and keeps more than 50,000 in his home at all times. Natasha eats entire jars of clay face masks every day.
36	8	"Blood Drinker"	March 20, 2013
Michelle has been addicted to drinking blood for 15 years, both human and pig blood.

=== Season 5 (2014) ===
No. overall	No. in season	Title	Original release date	U.S. viewers (millions)
37	1	"I'm a Living Doll"	January 1, 2014U	1.48
In "I'm a Living Doll", meet Justin, Venus, and Emily: three individuals who go to extreme physical and behavioral efforts to live as dolls.
38	2	"Pony Play / Addicted to Drinking Paint"	January 1, 2014	1.33
For the past 20 years, 31-year-old Nicole has been addicted to Pony Play, a form of costumed role play. Meanwhile, 43-year-old single mother of two Heather has been addicted to drinking paint for nearly three years.
39	3	"Identical Twin Obsession / Eats Mattresses"	January 1, 2014	1.46
44-year-old twins Amy and Becky are addicted to being identical, looking alike, acting alike, and even weighing their meals to stay the exact same size. Meanwhile, 26-year-old Jennifer has been addicted to eating mattresses for over 20 years.
40	4	"Proud to Be Plastic"	January 8, 2014	1.90
Lacey, a 44-year-old mother of six, has had at least 30 plastic surgery procedures and spent more than $250,000 building the most extreme body in the world.
41	5	"Chews Dirty Diapers / Addicted to Leeches"	January 15, 2014	0.93
Profiled addicts include a 22-year-old woman who is addicted to chewing on urine-soaked diapers and a 50-year-old man who uses leeches up to 40 times a year.
42	6	"Addicted to Dolls / Eats Plastic Bags"	January 22, 2014	0.94
Addicts include a 23-year-old man who's addicted to eating plastic newspaper bags and a 48-year-old woman whose best friend is a doll.
43	7	"Justin Bieber Look-Alike / Make-Up Eater"	January 29, 2014	1.05
This episode profiles Toby, 33, who has spent $100,000 in surgeries to look like Justin Bieber, and Britonni, 22, who is addicted to eating makeup every day.

=== Season 6 (2015) ===
No. overall	No. in season	Title	Original release date	U.S. viewers (millions)
44	1	"Men in Doll Suits"	January 7, 2015	N/A
Men who get dolled up in secret are stepping out in public for the first time at rubber doll rendezvous. This is an insider's look into the world of female maskers: men who dress in rubber suits and masks to look like life-sized, shapely female dolls.
45	2	"Eats Bricks / Married to a Carnival Ride"	January 14, 2015	N/A
In this episode, profiled addicts include a woman who loves a carnival ride and a woman has been eating bricks for a dozen years.
46	3	"Addicted to Being Pamela Anderson"	January 14, 2015	N/A
In this episode, Carolyn Anderson, a 29-year-old woman from the UK, is addicted to transforming herself into Baywatch beauty Pamela Anderson.
47	4	"Air Freshner / Giraffe Woman"	January 21, 2015	N/A
Profiled addicts include: Evelyn, who drinks air freshener every day, and Sydney, who is obsessed with having the world's longest neck.
48	5	"Psychics / Addicted to Body Casting"	January 21, 2015	N/A
This episode of My Strange Addiction profiles Kevin Casters, who constantly covers his body in plaster casts even though he is not injured, and Melissa, who is incapable of making a decision without consulting a psychic.
49	6	"Grandma Lover / Addicted to Being Madonna"	January 28, 2015	N/A
My Strange Addiction profiles addicts including Kyle, 31, who exclusively dates women over the age of 65, and Adam, who is intent upon becoming Madonna.
50	7	"Top 10 Most Shocking"	February 4, 2015	N/A

=== Season 7 (2026) ===
No. overall	No. in season	Title	Original release date	U.S. viewers (millions)
45	1	"Raw Meat, Snorting Food, Huge"	January 7, 2026	N/A
Wendy eats up to two pounds of raw meat a day, causing concerns.
46	2	"Eats Bugs, Extreme Skin Care, Munches Makeup"	January 14, 2026	N/A
47	3	"Vabbing, Snakes, Grass Eater"	January 21, 2026	N/A
48	4	"Hot Glue Eater, Cardboard Consumption, Breastfeeding"	January 28, 2026	N/A
49	5	"Sponge Snacks, Eats Toenails, Extreme Sunbathing"	February 4, 2026	N/A
50	6	"Sniffing Underwear, Kangaroo Mom, 100 Cups of Coffee A Day"	February 11, 2026	N/A
51	7	"Snorting Cleaner, Chomping Cat Food, Eating Butter"	February 18, 2026	N/A
52	8	"AI Boyfriend, Sucking Thumbs"	February 25, 2026	N/A

== Reception ==
The New York Daily News declared the show the "most disgusting reality show on television", while US Weekly gave the series a two-star rating, stating "afflictions are fascinating, but too much time is spent gawking at their odd behavior as opposed to treating it. Only in the final moments do therapists pay a visit, and they oversimplify things by suggesting exercise and journaling!". TV Guide called the series "maybe the most entertaining freak show on television now, and definitely the most guilt-free one", noting that "the lack of hand-wringing feels deliciously subversive".

== Authenticity ==
Specific cases on the show have raised concerns that at least some portrayals are fictional or falsified. For example, Divya Anantharaman, who is featured as being addicted to taxidermy in season 2, is a social media influencer and author who does taxidermy full-time for museums and celebrities. There is a large number of Pica-like cases where subjects claim they consume materials known to be fatal when swallowed in the quantities shown. These include gasoline, camphor (contained in VapoRub), broken glass, and other non-food objects.
