= Rolling Papers (2015 film) =

- Directed by: Mitch Dickman
- Starring: Ricardo Baca
- Release date: March 15, 2015 (SXSW)
- Country: United States

Rolling Papers is a 2015 documentary film directed by Mitch Dickman and featuring Ricardo Baca. The "deceptively rote title" is said to be a winking reference to Baca's work as a newspaper writer.

== Reception ==
The Guardian gave the documentary three out of five stars. Neil Genzlinger of The New York Times wrote: "The film... has a maddeningly short attention span, delving just far enough into one subject to whet your appetite before flitting on to the next. That approach extends to a secondary theme: whether the pot beat is just a gimmick, a desperate effort to attract attention and readers. That possibility is raised but never really examined... So the two most likely audiences for this documentary — people interested in marijuana and people interested in the news business — will probably find it shallower than they’d hoped. It's full of discussion points but lets them go by undiscussed."
