= Tracey Bell =

Canadian comedian

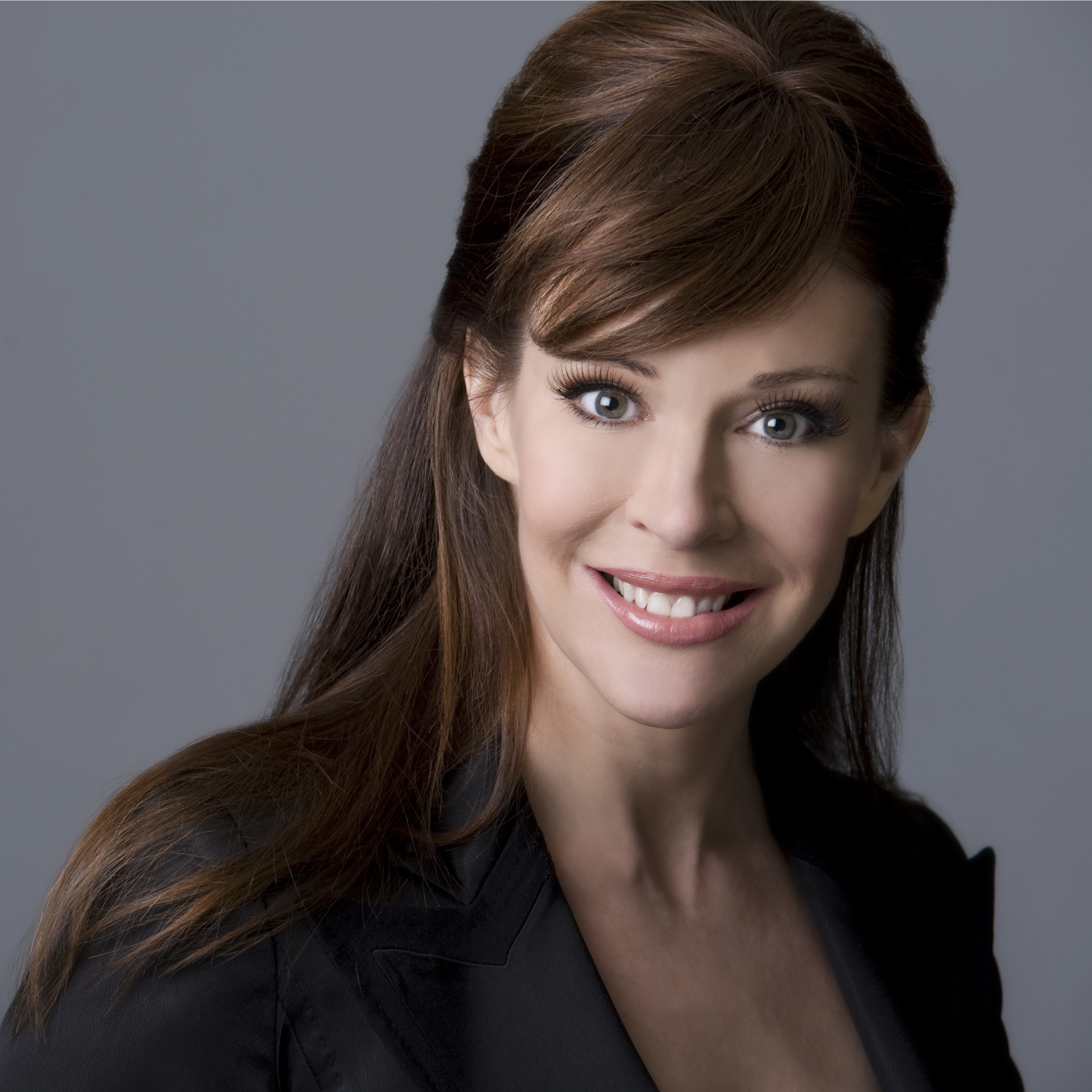
- Tracey Bell in 2009
- Occupations: Celebrity impersonator, comedian
- Years active: 1985–present
- Website: www.traceybell.com

Tracey Bell is a Canadian comedian, impersonator, and impressionist. She is the creator of the one-woman show, "8 Divas in 44 Minutes" and known for her live impersonations of celebrities like Cher, Marilyn Monroe, Madonna, Liza Minnelli, Tina Turner, Janis Joplin, Celine Dion, and Dolly Parton.

== Early life ==
Tracey Bell was raised in Edmonton, Alberta, Canada. As a child, she drew pictures of herself as a future movie star. She started performing as a young age in her basement and did a regular Sonny Bono and Cher skit with a friend, alternating roles each time. She also did early impersonations of Judy Garland's Dorothy Gale from The Wizard of Oz when she was in high school. Her first job was at 14 at Woolco where she made product announcements.

== Career ==
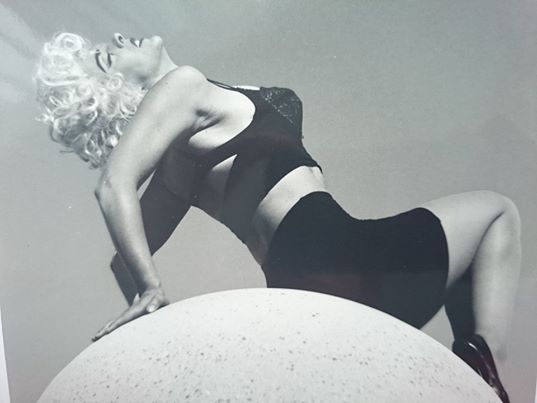
Tracy Bell as Madonna.

In 1985, Bell was studying sociology in university and working as a coat check girl at Goose Loonies, a night club in Edmonton. At Goose Loonies, she began doing Tina Turner and Marilyn Monroe impersonations and became a nightly performer, later impersonating popular musical acts like Doctor and the Medics, Amazulu, and Katrina and the Waves. She began working independently three years later.

After performing at clubs for a number of years, Bell created a one-woman show called, "8 Divas in 44 Minutes" for her public and corporate events, built around her impersonations of famous "divas" including Cher, Marilyn Monroe, Celine Dion, Janis Joplin, Tina Turner, Dolly Parton, Liza Minnelli, and Madonna to go along with interactive audience participation.

Bell has impersonated other celebrities such as Lady Gaga, Shania Twain, Judy Garland's Dorothy Gale in The Wizard of Oz, Julie Andrews' Maria von Trapp from The Sound of Music, and Nicole Kidman's Satine from Moulin Rouge. She has also impersonated characters like Jem from Jem and the Holograms and created her own original characters like Lucy Potatoe.

Bell has also sung "Happy Birthday" as Marilyn Monroe to former Canadian Prime Minister Pierre Trudeau.

Bell is also an ally of the LGBT community, having performed at events like the 2016 Edmonton Pride Festival.

== Film and television ==
Bell appeared as Cher on The Post-Modern Prometheus, an Emmy Award-winning episode of The X-Files. The show's creator, Chris Carter, had originally written the episode with Cher in mind, but Bell was cast to play her when Cher was unavailable. After the episode aired on television, viewers questioned whether or not Cher had in fact guest-starred on the show.

== Awards ==
Bell was the 2005 Winner for Entertainer of the Year by the Canadian Special Event Industry Awards. She has also won Entertainer of the Year at the BC Event Industry Awards. In 2015, she was again nominated by the Canadian Special Event Industry Awards for Entertainer of the Year.
