= Magill's History of Europe =

Magill's History of Europe is a book written by Frank Northen Magill, published in 1993 by the Grolier Educational Corporation.

== Introduction ==
Part of a six-volume series documenting the history of Europe, the first volume of Magill's History of Europe identifies and elaborates upon the key events in European history from the dawn of civilization until the year 451. Rather than address historical trends in lengthy narratives, it highlights the situations and repercussions surrounding individual events that shaped Europe and includes analyses of two comprehensive works describing each of them. Primarily written for those conducting scholarly research, it contains a large collection of references and assumes its readers have a moderate knowledge of European history.

Unlike most historical works, it does not attempt to form a particular or overall impression of European history; instead, it strives to give the reader additional insight into specific events and better clarification of the situations surrounding them. Its descriptions of little-known events like the Battle of Kadesh, the Naval Law of Themistocles, and Marius's creation of a professional Roman army help explain the underlying reasons behind the isolation of Egypt from the rest of Europe, the superiority of Athens over many of its fellow Greek cities, and the transformation of the Roman military into a force designed for conquest (Magill, 1993).

It downplays the praise of several seemingly notable achievements, particularly the Code of Hammurabi and the Battle of Zama (Magill, 1993). Popular misconceptions of the magnanimity of Julius Caesar and the democracy of Athens are shattered by its revelation of the biased accounts of Julius Caesar's Gallic conquests and the political inequalities in Athens (Magill, 1993). In spite of its potentially controversial topics, the book still tries to steer clear of unscholarly bias and prejudice, a necessity for scholars seeking serious facts and not mere opinions.
