= Frank Ching =

American architect

- Born: 1943 (age 82–83); Honolulu, Hawaii, U.S.
- Occupations: Author, architect, professor
- Years active: 1972–present
- Website: www.frankching.com/wordpress/

Francis D. K. "Frank" Ching (born 1943) is an American architecture and design graphics writer. He is professor emeritus at the University of Washington.

== Biography ==
Ching was born and raised in Honolulu, Hawaii. He received his B.Arch. from the University of Notre Dame in 1966. After several years of practice, in 1972 he joined the faculty at Ohio University to teach drawing. To support his lectures in architectural graphics, Ching hand-drew and hand-lettered his lecture notes. Department chairman Forrest Wilson presented these notes to the publisher, Van Nostrand Reinhold, and they were published in 1975, in an edited version, as Architectural Graphics, a book now in its seventh edition. Ching has gone on to produce twelve other books, including Building Construction Illustrated and Architecture: Form, Space & Order.

Ching's printing has been adopted by Adobe in its Tekton font family.

Ching was, for a time, an architecture faculty member at the University of Wisconsin–Milwaukee. By the late 1980s he had begun teaching at the University of Washington in the Department of Architecture. He became a full professor in 1991. For the next fifteen years, he routinely taught introductory architecture studios and directed beginning graphics classes. In 2006 Ching retired, though he continued to teach on a part-time basis until 2011. He now holds the rank of professor emeritus.

He taught as a visiting faculty member at Tokyo Institute of Technology in 1990 and at the Chinese University of Hong Kong in 1993.

Ching has received the Honorary Degree of Doctor of Design from Nottingham Trent University, the S. Y. Chung Visiting Fellowship, New Asia College, Chinese University of Hong Kong; and a Citation for Excellence in International Architecture Book Publishing.

Ching received the Special Jury Commendation in the 2007 Cooper-Hewitt National Design Awards, and an AIA 2007 Institute Honor Award for Collaborative Achievement.

Since 2012, Ching has been actively posting on his blog Seeing.Thinking.Drawing. Most of his posts feature personal sketches of various locales around Washington state.

== Books ==
The following list includes Frank Ching's books published in English; many of his books have been translated into one or more other languages.

- Ching, Frank (Francis D.K.), Architectural Graphics, Van Nostrand Reinhold, New York 1975; 2nd ed. 1985; 3rd ed. 1996; 4th ed. John Wiley, New York 2003; 5th ed. 2009 ISBN 0-471-20906-6; 6th ed. 2015
- Ching, Frank (Francis D.K.), Architecture: Form, Space & Order, Van Nostrand Reinhold, New York 1979, 2nd ed. 1996, 3rd ed. John Wiley, Hoboken 2007; ISBN 0-471-75216-9
- Ching, Frank (Francis D.K.), and Winkel, Steven R., Building Codes Illustrated: A Guide to Understanding the 2000 International Building Code, John Wiley, Hoboken 2003; ISBN 0-471-09980-5
- Ching, Frank (Francis D.K.), and Winkel, Steven R., Building Codes Illustrated: A Guide to Understanding the 2006 International Building Code, John Wiley, Hoboken 2007; ISBN 0-471-74189-2
- Ching, Frank (Francis D.K.), Building Construction Illustrated, Van Nostrand Reinhold, New York 1975, 2nd ed. 1991 (Cassandra Adams, co-author), 3rd ed. John Wiley, New York 2003 (Cassandra Adams, co-author); ISBN 0-471-35898-3
- Ching, Frank (Francis D.K.), with Juroszek, Steven P., Design Drawing, Van Nostrand Reinhold, New York 1998, ISBN 0-442-01909-2
- Ching, Frank (Francis D.K.), Drawing: A Creative Process, Van Nostrand Reinhold, New York 1990, ISBN 0-442-31818-9
- Ching, Frank (Francis D.K.), Jarzombek, Mark M., and Prakash, Vikramaditya, A Global History of Architecture, John Wiley, Hoboken 2007, ISBN 0-471-26892-5
- Ching, Frank (Francis D.K.), and Miller, Dale E., Home Renovation, Van Nostrand Reinhold, New York, 1983, ISBN 0-442-21591-6
- Ching, Frank (Francis D.K.), Interior Design Illustrated, Van Nostrand Reinhold, New York 1987; 2nd ed. John Wiley, Hoboken 2005 (co-author Corky Binggell), ISBN 0-471-47376-6
- Ching, Frank (Francis D.K.), Sketches from Japan, Wiley, New York 2000, ISBN 0-471-36360-X
- Ching, Frank (Francis D.K.), A Visual Dictionary of Architecture, Van Nostrand Reinhold, New York 1995, ISBN 0-442-00904-6
- Onouye, Barry, Zuberbuhler, Douglas, and Ching, Frank, Building Structures Illustrated: Patterns, Systems, and Design, John Wiley & Sons, New York, 2009.
- Ching, Frank (Francis D.K.), A Visual Dictionary of Architecture, Second Edition. John Wiley & sons, New Jersey 2012. ISBN 0-442-00904-6
- Ching, Frank (Francis D.K.), Mark M. Jarzombek, Vikramaditya Prakash, A Global History of Architecture, 3rd Edition. John Wiley & Sons, 2017. ISBN 978-1-118-98133-7
