= Venus D-Lite =

American drag performer (born 1983)

- D-Lite in 2017
- Born: Adam Daniel Guerra; September 5, 1983 (age 43); Rosemead, California, U.S.
- Education: Orange Coast College; Los Angeles Community College
- Occupations: Drag artist; Madonna impersonator
- Years active: 2002–2025

Adam Daniel Guerra (born September 5, 1983), known by his stage name Venus D-Lite, is an American drag performer, television personality and Madonna impersonator. He gained recognition for competing on the third season of RuPaul's Drag Race, and went viral with his appearance in a My Strange Addiction episode called "Addicted To Being Madonna" (2015).

== Early life and education ==
Guerra was raised in Rosemead, California. He attended San Gabriel High School and then Orange Coast College, where he majored in business. He was also pursuing a degree in film from Los Angeles Community College, but dropped out in order to pursue a career in drag full-time.

== Career ==
Guerra started performing as D-Lite (in a Marilyn Monroe impersonation) on August 5, 2002 and made his first television appearance on The Ricki Lake Show in 2003. His drag name came from a combination of “Venus” (taken from “Venus Was Her Name”, a song by Shocking Blue), and “D-Lite”, a name thought of by Guerra's then-boyfriend and makeup artist of three years. A fan of Madonna, he spent over $175,000 on 19 surgeries to look like her for his performances. He was announced as a contestant on RuPaul's Drag Race season 3 on January 24, 2011. He was eliminated in the first episode, after losing a lip sync to "The Right Stuff" by Vanessa Williams against Shangela, and placed thirteenth. He did however make a guest appearance on the first episode of the fourth season.

In 2014, he made an appearance on Botched to get rhinoplasty surgery. He was in an episode of My Strange Addiction in 2015 to discuss his Madonna obsession. He was also with fellow Drag Race alumni in an episode of Skin Wars.

On February 5, 2015, Drag Race winner Bianca Del Rio featured Venus in an episode of her WOWPresents web series "Really Queen?" where she made jokes about her. Venus appeared in a reaction video on February 25 by WOW making jokes back at Del Rio.

Aside from Madonna, he has previously impersonated Marilyn Monroe, Paris Hilton, Cher, Gwen Stefani, Judy Garland, and Barbra Streisand.

== Music ==
Guerra released his first single "I'm Not Madonna" featuring singer Jenn Cuneta on July 7, 2014, on a remix EP. He collaborated with fellow Botched guests Toby Sheldon and Kitty Jay for the single "The Plastics", credited as a band of the same name.

== Personal life ==
Guerra is gay. In 2021, he came out as HIV-positive in an interview with Joseph Shepherd.

In June 2022, Venus made an Instagram post admitting that he was raped by a fellow Drag Race alum in 2013, one described as a “popular queen”, but refused to name the rapist.

== Filmography ==
=== Television ===
Year	Title	Role	Notes
2003	The Ricki Lake Show	Himself	
2011, 2012	RuPaul's Drag Race	Himself	Season 3 – 13th, Season 4 – Guest
2011	RuPaul's Drag Race: Untucked	Himself	
2014	Botched	Himself	Season 1 – Episode 5: "Like a Surgeon"
2015	My Strange Addiction	Himself	Season 6 – Episode 6: "Grandma Lover / Addicted to Being Madonna"
2015	Skin Wars	Himself	Season 2 – Episode 4: "Queens or Divas?"

=== Web series ===
Year	Title	Role
2018	Hey Qween!	Herself

== Discography ==
=== Singles ===
Year	Title
2014	"I'm Not Madonna"
2014	"The Plastics"
