= Nadya Ginsburg =

Actress

- Occupations: Actress, comedian, television writer
- Years active: 1999–present
- Known for: Impersonations of Madonna and Cher, Hype, Partners

Nadya Ginsburg is an American actress, comedian and television writer. She is best known as a cast member on the sketch comedy show Hype, her recurring role on the show Partners and for her online comedy videos where she appears as Cher and Madonna, most notably the web series The Madonnalogues.

== Career ==
Ginsburg's first high profile gig was as a cast member on the short-lived variety sketch TV show Hype, created and written by the Madtv writer Scott King. In 2010, she created a parody song and video of the Lady Gaga hit "Poker Face" with re-written lyrics about the meteorologist Al Roker, and it went viral. She subsequently appeared on Good Morning America and was interviewed by Roker. The national attention revitalised interest in a 2007 web series in which Ginsburg had starred called The Worm, in which she portrayed an alien being who impersonated Madonna, Cher, Winona Ryder and others.

Ginsburg's parody impersonation of Madonna spun into a live show called The Madonnalogues, which in turn became an eight-episode web series by the same name. She also co-wrote and starred in the short film If We Took a Holiday, in which she portrays an actress whose best friend requests that she pretend to be Madonna and accompany him for the whole of his birthday.

Ginsburg was a writer on the Joan Rivers show Fashion Police for two years. She left the show as part of a writer's strike complaining that Rivers refused to pay fair wages or provide health insurance to the writing team.

== Filmography ==
=== Film ===
Year	Title	Role	Notes
1999	Let it Snow	Store Owner	
1999	The Crown Knights	Various voices	North American dub release
2005	Lincoln's Eyes	Various voices	
2005	Adam & Steve	Miranda	
2008	Reunion	Maureen	
2009	The Couch	Bobka	
2013	Coulrophobia or the Greatest Dinner Party on Earth	Shari	
2014	If We Took a Holiday	Nadya/Madonna	
2015	Club King	Self	
2017	Her Side of the Bed	Naomi	
2020	Friendsgiving	Aunt Anna	
2020	Barbie & Kendra Save the Tiger King	Isadora Manacotti Exotic	

=== Television ===
Year	Title	Role	Notes
2000	Spy Groove	Various voices	
2000-2001	Hype	Various	
2010	The Damiana Files	Madonna	
2011	Selene's Hollywood Confidential	Self	
2013	RuPaul's Drag Race	Self (Guest Judge)	
2013	Brody Stevens: Enjoy It!	Self	
2013	Betty Bowers: America's Best Christian	Madonna	Episode: "America's Best Christian Pageant"
2012-2013	Partners	Roberta Hockman-Klein	4 episodes
2015	Hard Decisions	Julianne Majestique	2 episodes
2016	2 Broke Girls	Michelle	Episode: "And the Ten Inches"
