= Ricardo Baca =

American journalist

Rick Baca
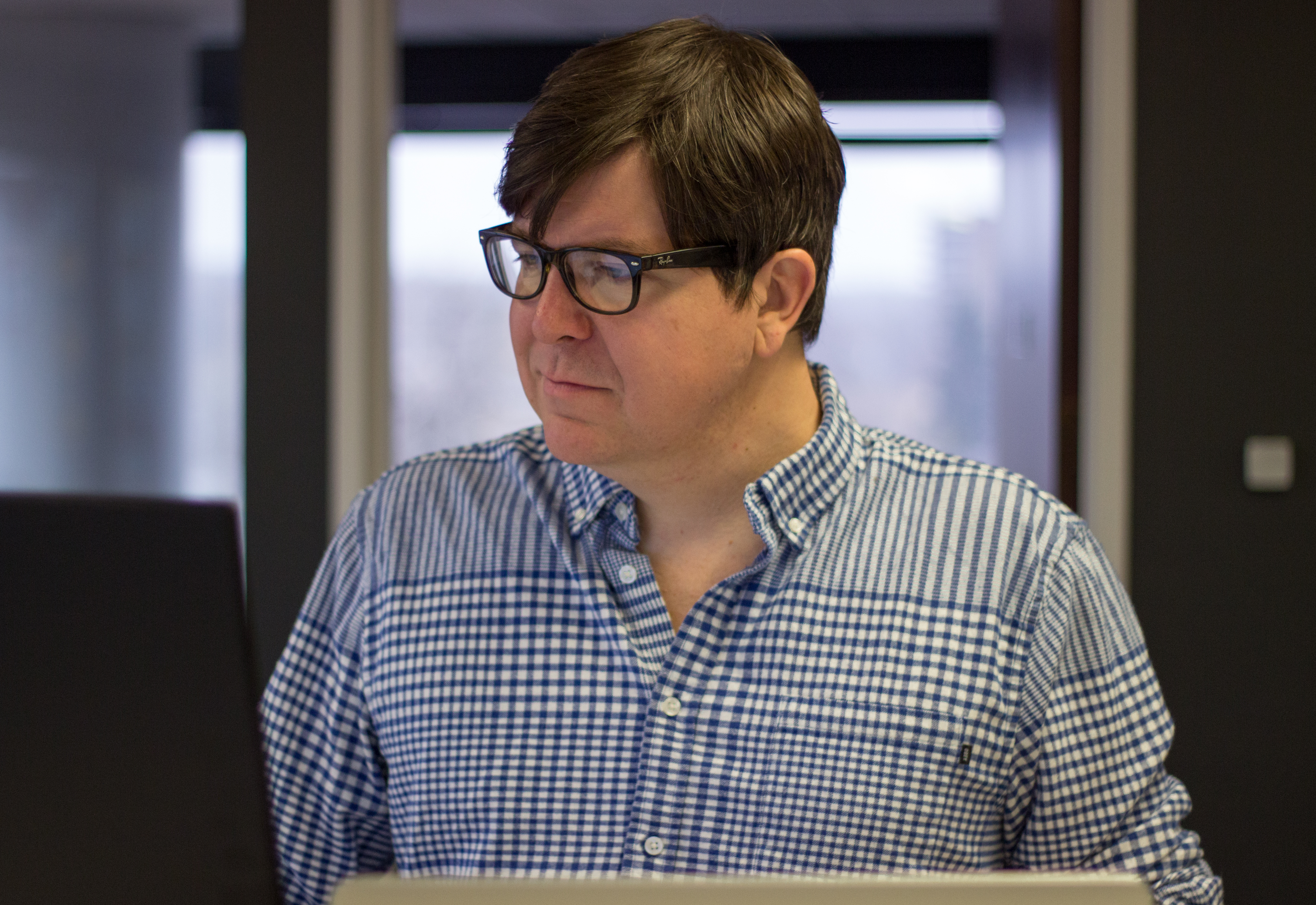
- Born: c. 1977 (age 48–49)
- Education: Metropolitan State University of Denver
- Occupations: Journalist, editor
- Known for: The Denver Post; Rolling Papers

Ricardo Baca (born c. 1977) is an American journalist best known for being the first full-time marijuana rights editor for a major American newspaper. He was an editor at The Denver Post, producing The Cannabist for over three years until December, 2016. He is the "central character" of the 2015 documentary film Rolling Papers. He also shares his name with the first person to be convicted for the possession of marijuana after the Marijuana Tax Act of 1937 was put into action.

== Education ==
Baca went to high school at Westminster High School in the Denver suburbs, where he wrote for the school paper. He earned a bachelor's degree in journalism in 1999 from Metropolitan State University of Denver.

== Work ==
Prior to The Cannabist, Baca worked at Corpus Christi Caller-Times from 1999 to 2002, and following that, was The Denver Post's music critic and entertainment editor for more than a decade. Baca also co-founded Denver's Underground Music Showcase in 2002.

In 2016, Baca started Grasslands: A Journalism-Minded Agency, which provides PR, content, and social media marketing for cannabis businesses and others in highly regulated industries, real estate and healthcare.

== Personal life ==
Baca has been married since c. 2015.

== Books ==
- Baca, Ricardo; Davenport, Jad; Schindler Connors, Martha; Wagner, Kyle (2012). Fodor's Colorado (10th ed.). Fodor's. ISBN 9780307928429.

== Film ==
- Rolling Papers, 2015, directed by Mitch Dickman
