= Philanthropy and activism of Madonna =

Aspect of Madonna's career

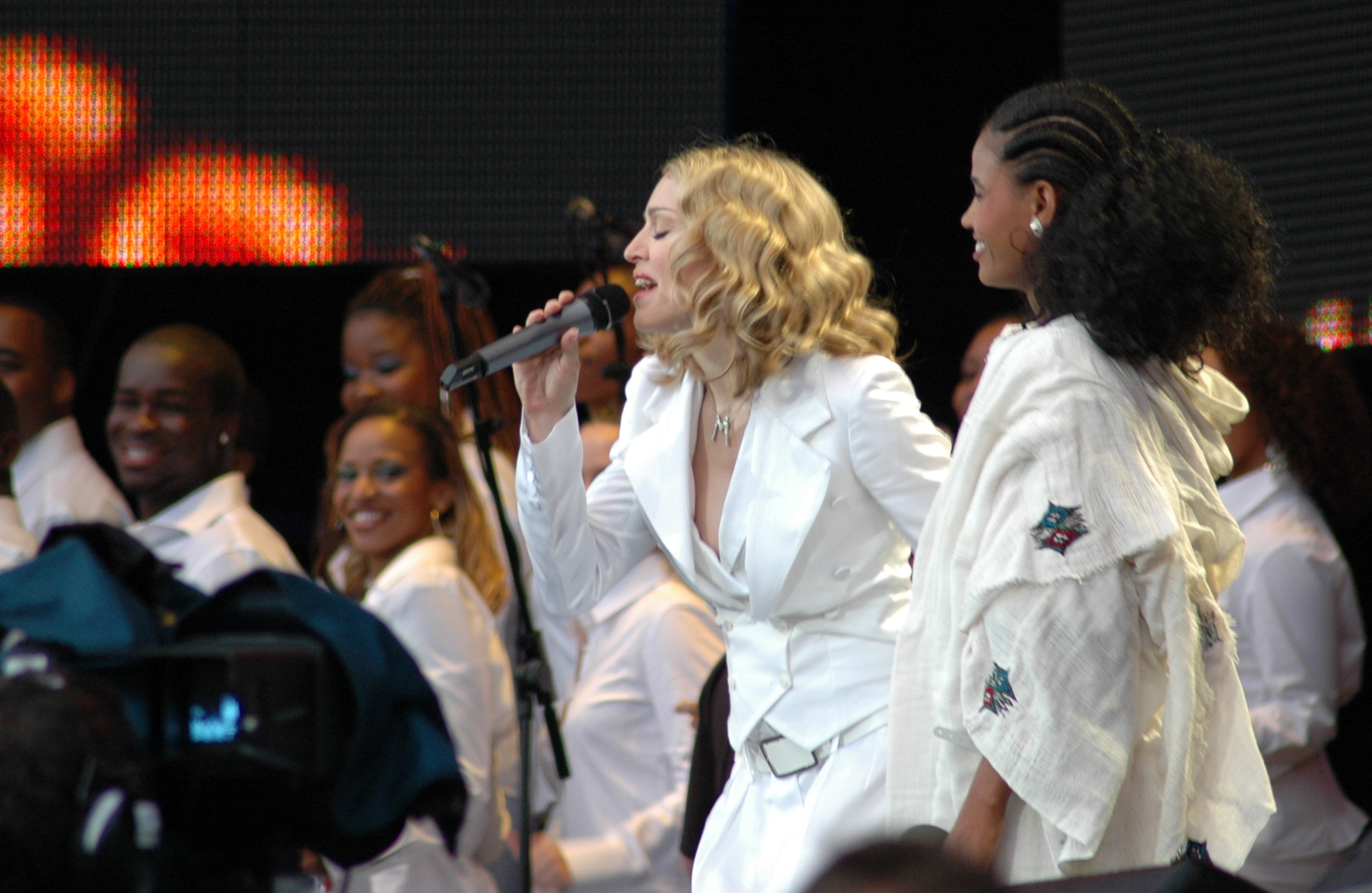
Madonna performs onstage at the Live 8 concert, London (2005), next to Birhan Woldu, a former Ethiopian famine victim (1983–1985).

American singer-songwriter Madonna (1958) has been known for her philanthropic endeavors, advocacy and political commentaries. She began as one of the first mainstream musicians to advocate in response to the HIV/AIDS epidemic in the 1980s. She has supported and spoken about a range of causes, including gender equality and LGBT rights, and has used her social media platforms, concerts, and her work to promote them.

Madonna has donated time and money to various charitable organizations and was sometimes a quiet donor. Her endeavors also include performing at various benefit concerts and participating in different charity releases. Madonna founded her own non-profit organizations in 1998 (Ray of Light Foundation) and 2006 (Raising Malawi). The first serves areas all over the world, while the second focuses its efforts on Malawi.

Known for her outspoken views, Madonna's advocacy and political commentary have attracted significant criticism, particularly over her provocative remarks and support for liberal causes. Her work in Malawi received a polarized reception. Madonna received awards from the AIDS Project Los Angeles (APLA) and American Foundation for AIDS Research (amfAR) for her work related to AIDS.

== Charitable activities ==
In Women Icons of Popular Music (2009), Carrie Havranek wrote that Madonna "downplays much of [...] her philanthropic efforts, despite the fact that she is a regular donor to AIDS charities and a quiet donor to a charity for breast cancer". With the advent of social media, Sarah Ezzy from Global Philanthropy Group (2015), commented "she's not shy about using her social media to highlight her giving and encourage others to give directly to those efforts". Mel Ottenberg from Interview (2021) said "Madonna does so much charitable work".

=== LGBT and AIDS-related causes ===
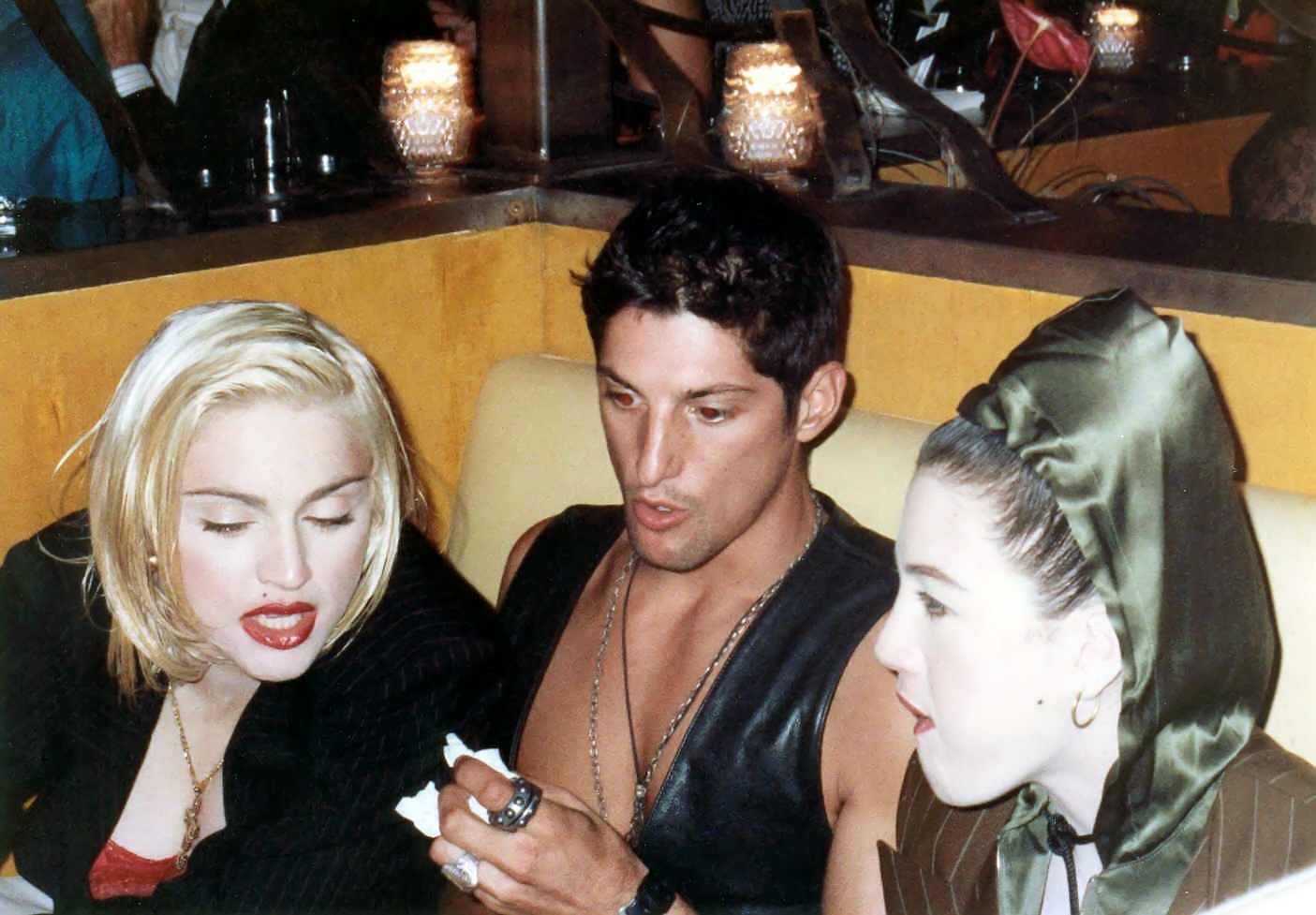
From left to right: Madonna with Tony Ward and Donna De Lory at a AIDS Project Los Angeles benefit gala in 1990

Biographer Carol Gnojewski (Madonna: Fighting for Self-Expression, 2017) stated that Madonna has "donated millions" to AIDS organizations. Writing for Billboard in 2001, Wayne Hoffman commented that her AIDS charity involves "money and time". She is considered to be one of the first musicians to advocate for the AIDS crisis, or one of the first "notable names" from the entertainment industry for the cause, according to publications such as Hollywood Reporter. Madonna offered moral and financial support to her HIV/AIDS-affected friends, including artist Keith Haring, and remembered the World AIDS Days multiple times. During the 2015 Rebel Heart Tour, she dedicated a performance and speech honoring survivors and victims.

Throughout the 1980s, Madonna had attended a fashion fundraiser event in November 1986. Madonna raised $400,000 for amfAR with a Madison Square Garden concert during her Who's That Girl World Tour (1987), becoming one of the first AIDS benefit concerts given by a celebrity according to Out. Rolling Stone labeled Madonna as the "first major American pop star" to stage such a large-scale AIDS fund-raiser. She also donated to the French Association of Artists Against AIDS from her Paris concert of the same tour. In 1989, Madonna attended a benefit dance marathon, with Christopher Flynn, her friend and dance mentor also diagnosed with the disease.

Throughout the 1990s, she frequently purchased back pages of Billboard magazine to enlist financial assistance for various AIDS relief and research organizations, and continued donating to AIDS causes with the profits of the Blond Ambition World Tour (1990), and the premiere of Truth or Dare (1991). She took part in Elizabeth Taylor's 65th birthday in 1997, and lent her name to the 1999 AIDS Walk in Detroit.

From the 2000s onwards, Madonna became a patron of Crusaid in 2002, donating signed items to raise money. She donated to Mobilization Against AIDS in 2007, and auctioned the following year a private concert for amfAR at the 61st Cannes Film Festival's Cinema Against AIDS, raising more than $560,000. She bestowed Jeremy Scott with the Award of Courage at the amfAR Gala in Los Angeles in November 2021, contributing also to the fundraising efforts. Madonna helped raise $100,000 for LGBTQ+ organizations during a Pride party at the Standard Hotels of New York, during the same year.

=== Education and child welfare ===
The Ray of Light Foundation, established in 1998, has supported the education of girls in Afghanistan, Pakistan, and other countries, and in Malawi through Raising Malawi which started in 2006.

Madonna attended Sport Aid's Race Against Time in 1988, designed for children's charities. According to Vegetarian Times in 1987, Madonna donated money from the profits of her first international tour, Who's That Girl? (1987) to different causes, including to a Chicago-based charity that refurbishes playgrounds with new equipment and soft ground surfaces. By February 1987, the Make-A-Wish Foundation had arranged a meeting between Madonna and a young leukemia patient, then 9 years old. A week prior, a spokesman for Warner Records stated she had "done similar things in the past", but without publicity. In early 2003, Madonna kept in touch with a 17-year-old girl with liver cancer through her final days via the Children's Wish Foundation of Canada. She has made visits to orphanages, and through the years, Madonna has been reported to have taken all her children on trips to do charitable work, particularly in Malawi, according to the author of Celebrity Philanthropy and Activism (2018). After her stop on the 2016 Rebel Heart Tour in Philippines, she visited the Bahay Tuluyan Foundation, a center that provides shelter for orphans and street children and also the Hospicio de San Jose.

During the 2000s, motivated by her interest in Kabbalah, Madonna reportedly donated millions of dollars to educational initiatives associated with the Kabbalah Centre, including Spirituality for Kids (Los Angeles) and the Kabbalist Grammar School for Children (New York City), with a reported number between $20 to $22 million. She also became patron of the UK-based charity Children of Peace, and served on the organizing committee for a 2009 Raisa Gorbachev Foundation charity gala. She supported children's causes by donating personal items for Romanian Gypsy's children education in 2009, and made a donation to a playground initiative in Russia in 2007.

=== Responses to humanitarian crises ===
Madonna made monetary donations to a number of crises and disasters. According to media reports, she became one of the first recording artists to make a donation to charities helping the victims of the World Trade Center and Pentagon attacks in September 2001. She gave $1 million from the proceeds of three Los Angeles concerts of her Drowned World Tour to children orphaned by the disaster. Helen Studd, a correspondent for the Irish Independent reported about her immediate response: "Her generosity has started a wave of contributions from designers and pop bands".

Madonna donated $500,000 to earthquake relief efforts in Pacentro, Italy, following the 2009 earthquake, and $250,000 to Partners in Health following the 2010 Haiti earthquake. As part of her fundraising efforts for Hurricane Sandy victims in 2012, Madonna exposed her buttocks during a MDNA Tour concert to encourage the audience to throw money at the stage. She visited victims of the Hurricane in Queens, New York, and by 2013 it was announced she would donate clothing used from that tour to raise money. The following year, in 2014, she responded to the Flint water crisis with a monetary donation granted to the Community Foundation of Greater Flint. According to some reports, Madonna helped raise $5.5 million to support people affected by the 2015 Malawi flood crisis.

Madonna had donated $10,000 to GoFundMe as part of a goal to raise $100,000 for the Christchurch mosque shootings in New Zealand in 2019. It was reported that she donated about $1.1 million toward the development of a COVID-19 vaccine in 2020 to the Bill & Melinda Gates Foundation. She also donated, in association with the Reform Alliance, 100,000 masks to prisons and jails across the country.

=== Benefit concerts and events ===
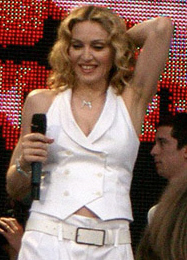
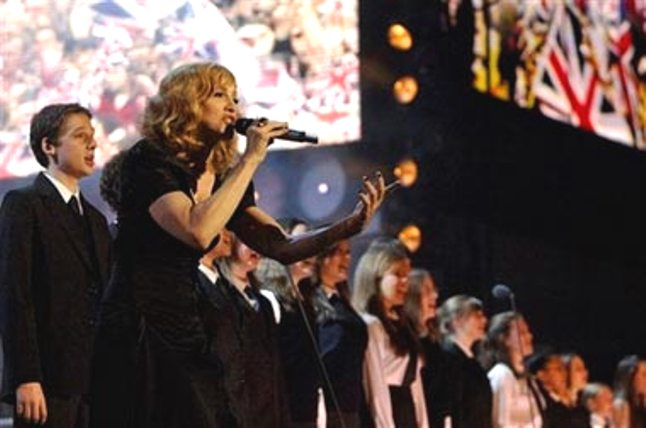
From left to right: Madonna during Live 8 (2005) and Live Earth (2007)

Madonna joined various benefit concerts, including Live Aid (1985), Live 8 (2005) and Live Earth (2007). She headlined the London concert of the lattermost event, and wrote "Hey You" in support of their campaign. Initially released as a free downloadable track, within these terms the song was available on MSN.com, and for each of the first one million free downloads, it was announced that 25 cents would be donated to the Alliance for Climate Protection.

Madonna participated in the 1998 concert for the Rainforest Foundation Fund to support indigenous people and rainforests. According to the Guinness World Records, it was the largest environmental fundraising event held. Madonna's song "Freedom" had previously appeared on their charity album Carnival! The Rainforest Foundation in 1997.

Madonna participated in Tsunami Aid, to raise money for the victims of the 2004 Indian Ocean earthquake and tsunami by performing a cover of "Imagine". She invited her audience through her official website to donate to the Red Cross. The next year, Madonna joined the BBC telethon, Children in Need 2005. In 2010, she joined Hope for Haiti Now in which she performed "Like a Prayer". In 2013, she gave a speech at the Chime for Change concert to benefit education, health and justice.

Madonna has participated in charity records and other visual media projects. In 1987, she contributed a cover of "Santa Baby" to the series' first charity album, A Very Special Christmas to benefit the Special Olympics. Madonna allowed her B-side song "Supernatural" to appear on the AIDS charity album Red Hot + Dance (1992), with a remix provided by Sly and Robbie, and recorded the alt-country song "Guilty By Association" with her brother-in-law Joe Henry, featured on the charity album, Sweet Relief II: Gravity of the Situation (1997). In 2004, Madonna introduced the Band Aid 20 video of the charity supergroup, Band Aid. In 2007, Madonna participated in "Sing" by Annie Lennox, a song released during the World AIDS Day in 2007. Madonna also joined the 2011 soundtrack Every Mother Counts from the documentary No Woman, No Cry.

In 1993, Madonna appeared on the The Arsenio Hall Show to benefit the Magic Johnson Foundation. In 1995, she presented a plaque to Muhammed Ali for the Parkinson's Disease Foundation, and assisted on a fund-raising gala honoring Gianni Versace in 1997. In 2017, Madonna made a surprise performance at the Leonardo DiCaprio Foundation's annual charity auction, helping raise money for the cause as well.

=== Music and arts ===
Madonna donated items to the Sweet Relief Musicians Fund in 1999. She joined the Music Rising initiative in raising funds to replace musical instruments and equipment destroyed during Hurricanes Katrina and Rita in 2006. In 2002, she joined the first EU Copyright Directive campaign in raising-awareness about the value of copyright. In 2005, Madonna joined the National Association of Broadcasters' campaign "Radio: You Hear It Here First" to promote terrestrial radio. During this time period, she also joined a campaign against music piracy. Madonna was part of a group of artists that were influential in the shutting down of Napster. Madonna has used the arts to support other artists or as a charitable activity. In 2022, Daniel Neira from celebrity magazine ¡Hola! said that "Madonna is known for being a supportive friend" and is "constantly showing support". According to Billboard in 2021, she joined the #FreeBritney movement.

== Views and other causes ==
Madonna has spoken out in favor of and on behalf of groups and individuals, through statements or works (songs, videos, or concerts). According to British author Lucy O'Brien, Madonna inherited the sense of "justice and inclusive politics" from her Italian paternal grandfather Gaetano Ciccone, who assisted in organizing a brief but "crippling strike" at the Aliquippa mill in the summer of 1937 which resulted in an improvement in the lives of the workers. Academic Douglas Kellner in Oh Fashion (1994), describes her as becoming "political" making "statements on behalf of AIDS victims, the homeless, saving the rain forests, and women's rights". In 2020, Bianca Gracie from Spin magazine stated "she's continuously shown advocacy for social injustices". According to author Nikolay Anguelov (2015), Madonna is "known for her humanitarian efforts in developing countries and support for environmental and social causes".

Rebecca Gulick wrote in her Madonna biography published in 1993, "Madonna believes that with her fame comes the responsibility to be a spokesperson". Writer Jennifer Egan (2002) echoed her: "I know I'm not the best singer, and I know I'm not the best dancer. But I'm not interested in that" but in being "political" as one of Madonna's professional goals. Madonna maintained her beliefs, and by 2017, she proclaimed "I have to get way more vocal" while feeling that the entertainment industry should be "more political", noting in her view, that many remain neutral in order to maintain their "popularity". She made similar remarks in 2019, claiming "I'm not here to be popular. I'm here to be free" which Jon Pareles from The New York Times regarded as part of her self-described "political voice".

=== Selected examples ===
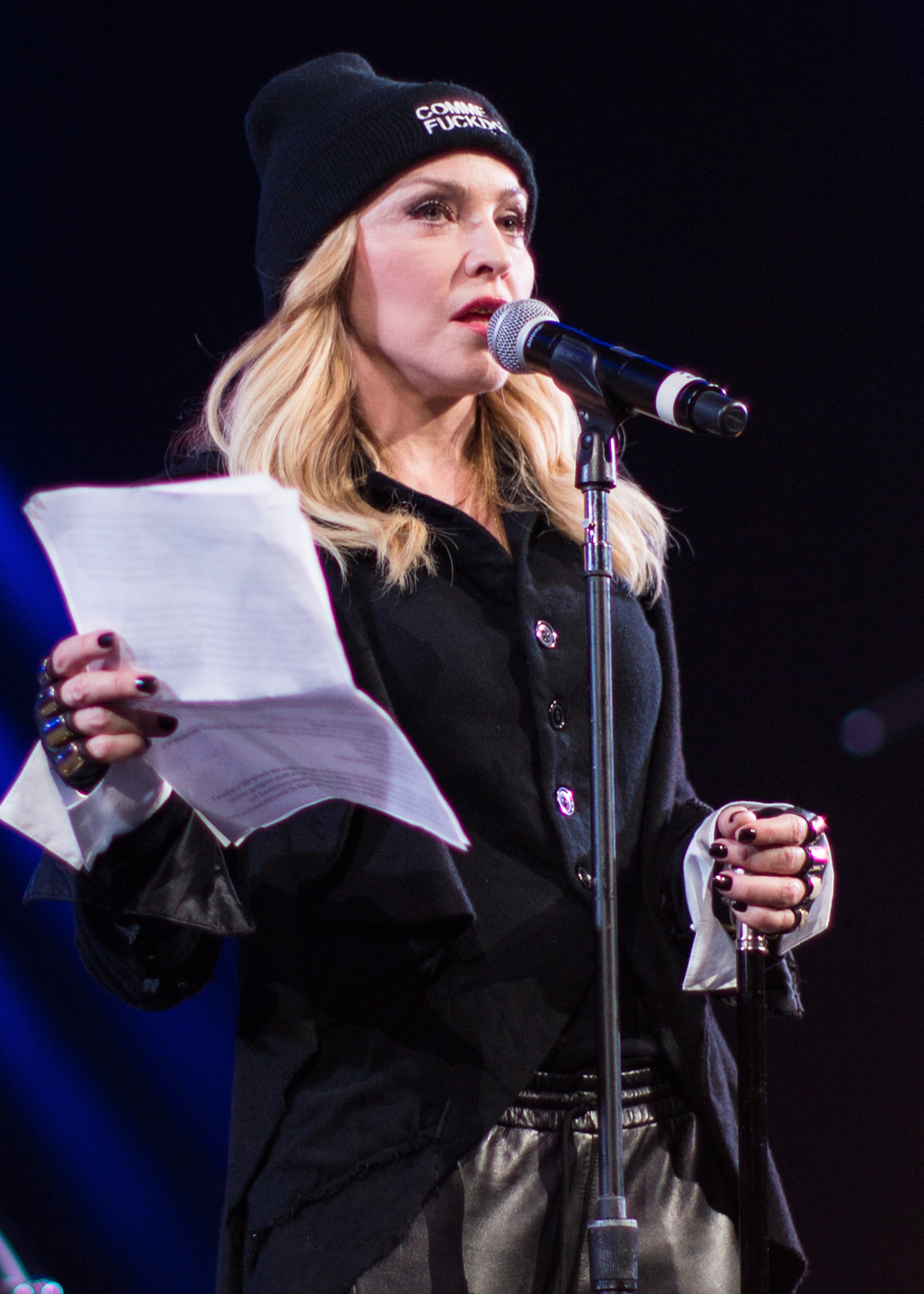
Madonna at Amnesty International's Bringing Human Rights Home concert introducing Pussy Riot in 2014

Madonna voiced her disapproval to the Romani discrimination in Eastern Europe during her Sticky & Sweet Tour concert in Romania in 2009. It was reported that her statements were negatively received by the crowd. In 2012, she donated 600 tickets for her MDNA Tour show in Tel Aviv to Israeli and Palestinian peace activists, including Peace Now's founder Yariv Oppenheimer and Ron Pundak, according to Haaretz. In 2013, Madonna released the short film secretprojectrevolution, which deals with human rights and was part of a campaign to raise money for those causes, according to Women's Wear Daily.

Madonna advocated the causes of others. During a concert in Russia as part of her MDNA Tour in 2012, Madonna expressed her support for the liberal feminist punk group Pussy Riot during their trial following their protest against and criticism of Russian president Vladimir Putin. She stated: "Everyone has the right to free speech, everywhere in the world". Two years later, Madonna introduced two of their members, Masha and Nadya at the 2014 Amnesty International's Bringing Human Rights Home. Madonna called for the release of Greenpeace activists detained in Russia in 2013.

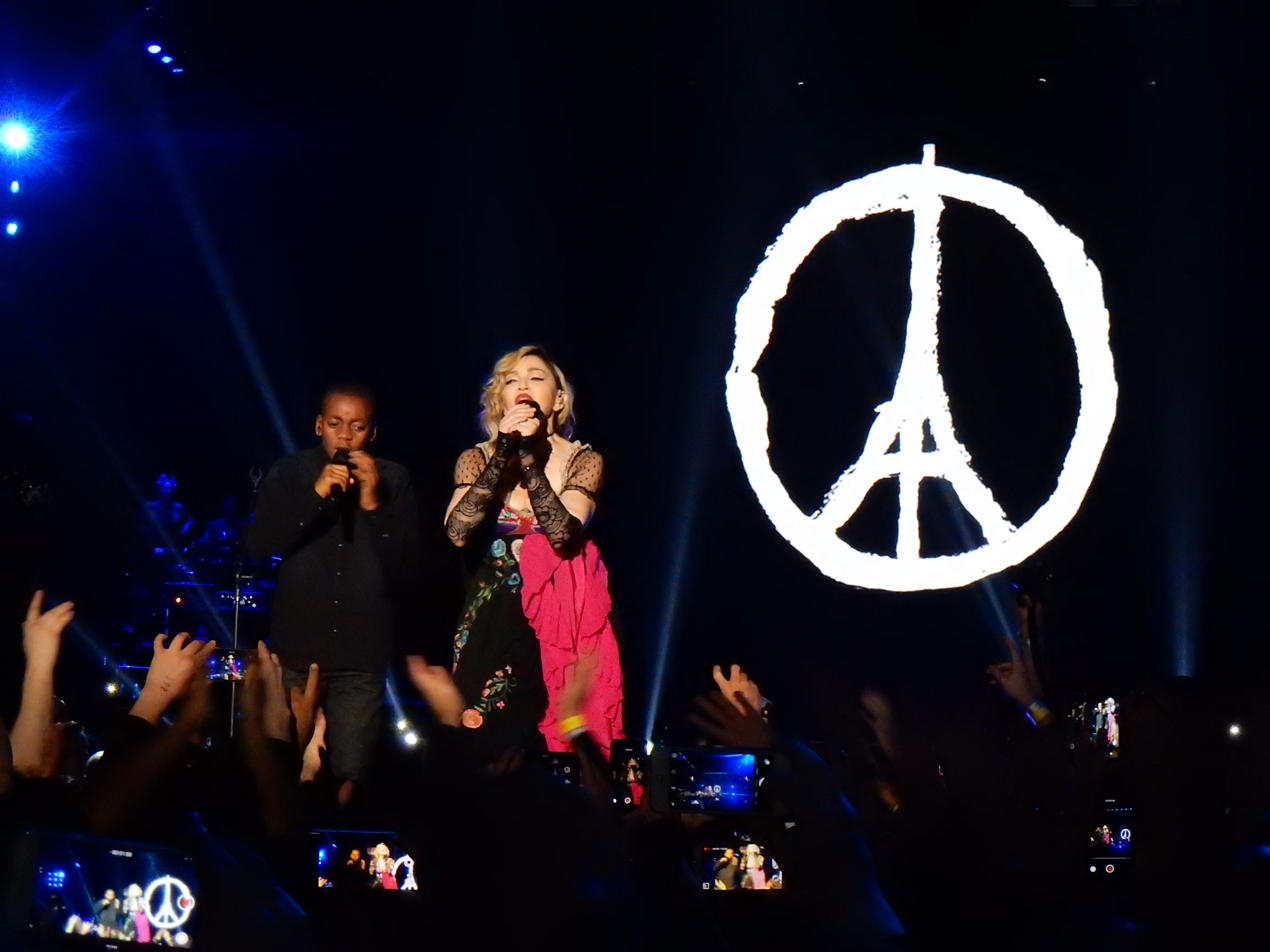
Madonna and her adopted son, David Banda, on stage in Paris in December 2015 (Rebel Heart Tour), paying tribute to the victims and survivors of the November 2015 Paris attacks.

In early 2015, Madonna spoke out against the Baga massacre in Nigeria. That same year, during the Rebel Heart Tour, she paid tribute to the victims of the Paris attacks by Islamists, and gave an impromptu performance at Place de la République singing acoustic versions of her songs "Ghosttown", "Like a Prayer", and a cover of John Lennon's "Imagine". American writer Christopher Bergland, said of the performance, "the fact one of the most famous people in the world, has the balls to sing... publicly on a street corner in Paris... should be inspiration to all of us to keep doing what we love to do".

In early 2020s, Madonna joined the Black Lives Matter movement, posting numerous threads, and encouraged her followers to donate to the George Floyd Memorial Fund. She later attended a protest in London in June 2020. Commenting on her attendance, Amy Mackelden, an editor of Harper's Bazaar, said she "was ... instantly recognizable" and "her support of the protest seemed to buoy the spirits of fellow protestors". Madonna shared a photo of the 2019 Amazon rainforest wildfires along with a caption expressing her concern about the fires. Madonna supported the digital campaign led by Global Citizen in 2022, called "Stand Up for Ukraine", which appealed for donations and other forms of support to those affected by the Russo-Ukrainian War. She invited her audience to support the cause and shared in her social media platforms a link of the Global Citizen article "9 Meaningful Ways You Can Help Ukraine". Madonna shared a cover of "Your Song" in the style of a "living room season".

==== Gun control ====
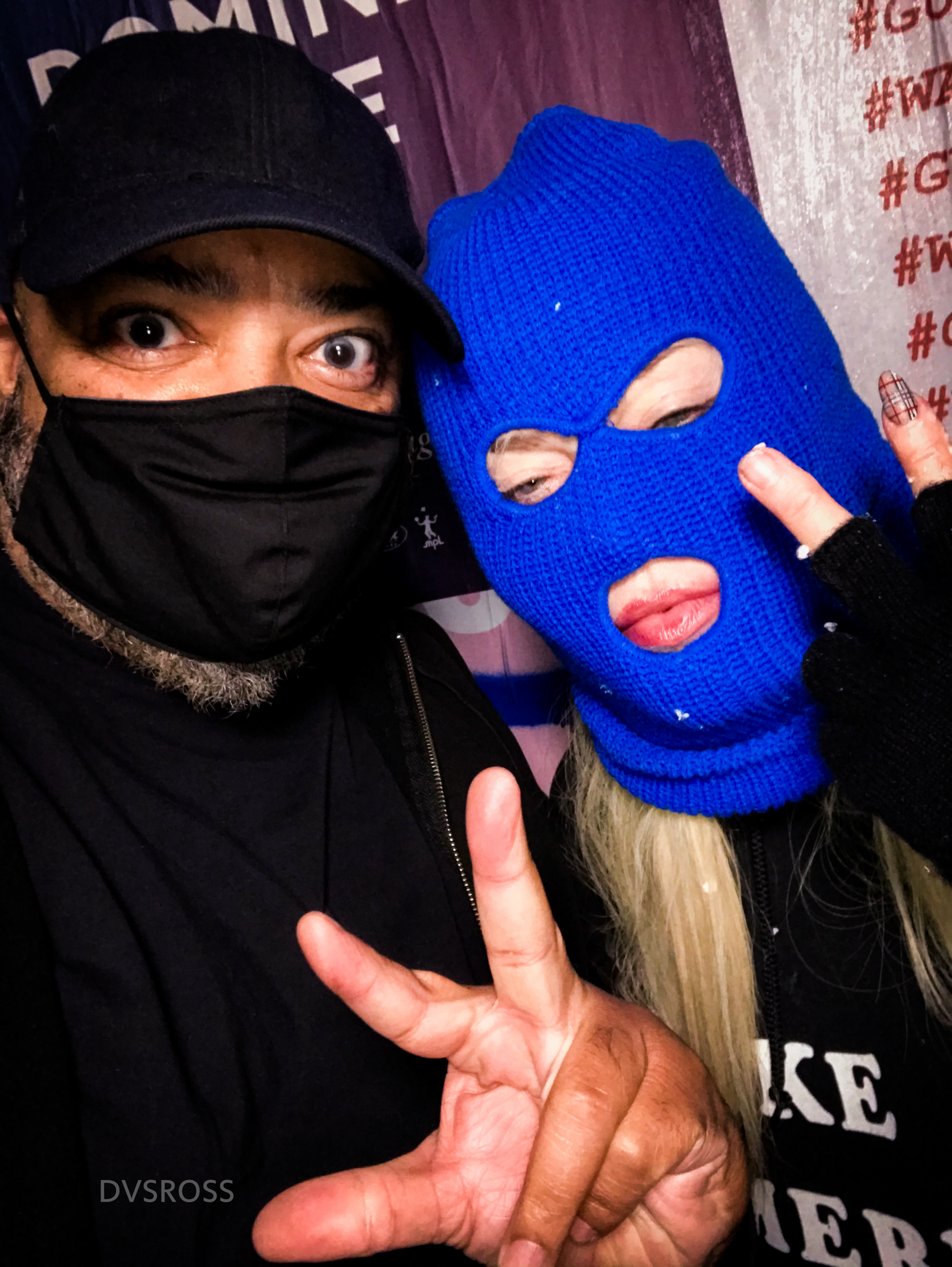
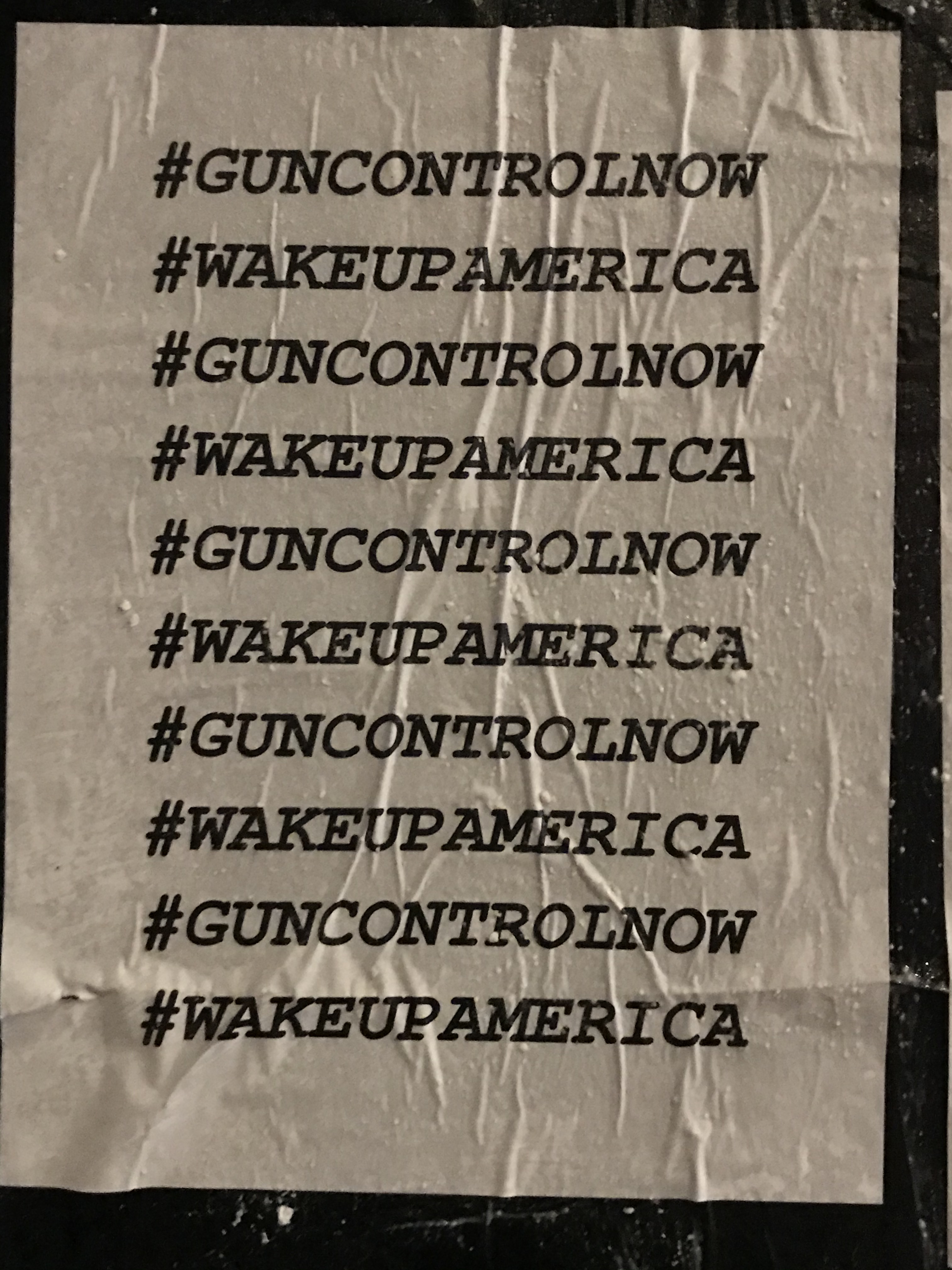
Madonna out on the streets of Los Angeles putting up gun control posters (right) by April 2021

Madonna spoke out about gun control rights on several occasions of her career, describing the issue in 2019, as "the biggest problem in America right now". In one of her media social post about school shootings and gun control, she expressed that she felt a "responsibility to the children of the world". By April 2021, Madonna had invited her audience to join the campaign of Everytown for Gun Safety, and she was later seen posting wheat paste stickers with messages about gun control on Los Angeles streets. In May 2022, she shared a lengthy post after the Texas shooting at the Robb Elementary School demanding a "Gun Reform" from lawmakers, calling out to the National Rifle Association.

Madonna released the video "God Control" from her 2019 album Madame X, which deals with the issue but earned controversy for its depiction of violence. Its video mentions affiliations with a number of gun control groups, while Ruth M. Glenn, president and CEO of the National Coalition Against Domestic Violence was pleased about Madonna's mention and support. Gun activists like Shannon Watts felt grateful that artists like Madonna were participating to spread awareness.

==== Political ====
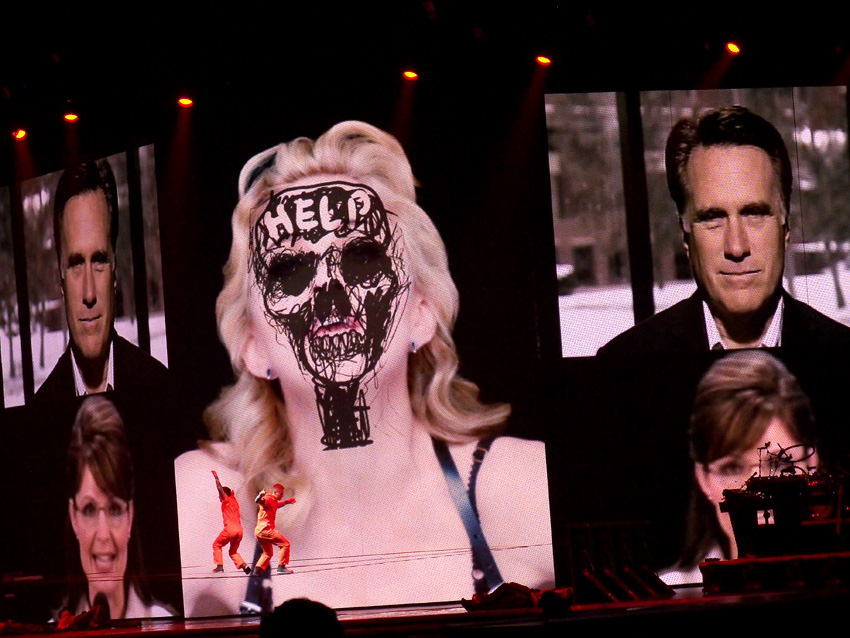
A video interlude of "Nobody Knows Me", which morphed Madonna's face with a number of famous figures, particularly political figures, on the MDNA Tour in 2012

At times Madonna has expressed her views on political issues. She voiced her concern about George W. Bush foreign policy with the invasion of Iraq. By 2004, she commented: "There's global terror everywhere and it's absurd to think you can get it by going to one country and dropping tons of bombs on innocent people". In 2014, Madonna called then-Venezuelan president Nicolás Maduro a fascist.

Madonna wrote an article to the inaugural issue of political-targeted magazine George in 1995. In 1990, Madonna participated in the first Rock the Vote campaign with a video. The campaign aimed to encourage young people to exercise their suffrage. In 1996, MTV's "Choose or Lose" reused the Madonna video.

Madonna supports the Democratic Party in her home country. She has expressed her support for presidential contenders, and other political figures, including Bill Clinton, Barack Obama, Joe Biden and Hillary Clinton, while encouraging her audience to practice suffrage. During her support of Hillary Clinton's presidential campaign in 2016, she held a surprise concert at Washington Square Park in New York on the final day of US election campaign, which The Guardian's Emma-Lee Moss described as an "astonishing concert". It was streamed live on Facebook.

== Organizations by Madonna ==
=== Raising Malawi ===
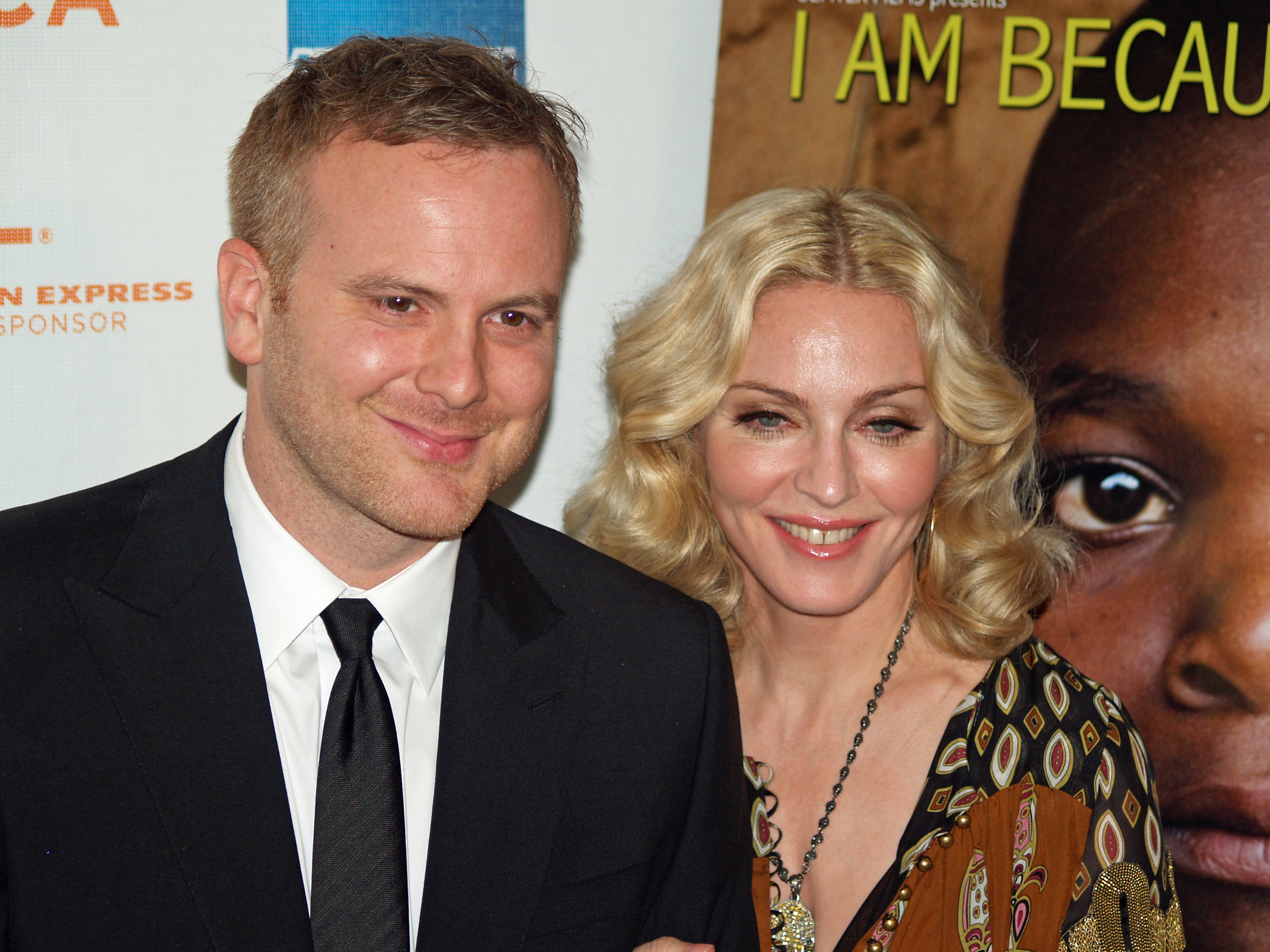
Madonna and Nathan Rissman during the premiere of I Am Because We Are at the 2008 Tribeca Film Festival

Madonna and Michael Berg founded Raising Malawi in 2006. The organization has supported numerous charitable initiatives and Madonna has orchestrated fundraising efforts.

In 2006, Madonna donated $1 million to build a compound that, as of 2011, fed over 1,500 orphans. Many of the children were cared for by Consol Homes Orphan Care, an organization Madonna assisted in the constructing of a power grid that provided electricity at the orphan care center, according to Madonna's official website. People magazine reported in 2018, that the organization had assisted in the construction of ten schools.

In 2016, during the Miami one-time performance of Madonna: Tears of a Clown, Madonna raised over $7.5 million after selling personal belongings. In 2017, the foundation opened up the Mercy James Institute for Pediatric Surgery and Intensive Care, named after Madonna's adopted Malawian children. It became the first children's hospital in the country. According to Trevor Neilson from Global Philanthropy Group (2013), she is the largest individual donor to the hospital and funds programs run by Eric Borgstein at Queen Elizabeth Central Hospital.

== Reactions ==
Madonna received awards from the AIDS Project Los Angeles (APLA) in 1990 and American Foundation for AIDS Research (amfAR) in 1991 for her charitable work in combating AIDS. Pete Hamill referred to her as "the greatest artistic force of the AIDS generation" in his book Piecework (2009). In 2018, Madonna was honored by the High School of Performing Arts in Malaga (in Spanish: Escuela Superior de Artes Escénicas de Málaga, ESAEM) for her artistic career and "social advocacy". In addition, they provided scholarships for two who were cared for in her charitable organization, Raising Malawi. Madonna thanked the school via a video message.

Madonna has attracted media attention and commentary from across the political spectrum for her advocacy, political activism, and style. Scholars and journalists, including Douglas Kellner (2003) and Matt Cain (2018), have credited Madonna with helping to break social barriers for "marginalized groups". However, editors Adam Geczy and Vicki Karaminas (2021) described her "political activism" as providing "disenfranchised groups with empowering identifications" while also situating it within the "cultural industry".

Professor Pamela Robertson (1996) argued that "Madonna's politics are empty of content" and "vague" to many critics. The staff of Argentine newspaper Los Andes stated in 2015, that her politically "incorrect" actions contributed to her fame. Various commentators have examined her provocative style. The authors of Popular Culture and the Civic Imagination (2020), referred to her as a self-proclaimed "Unapologetic Bitch" who deliberately uses shock value to draw attention to her message. Author and lawyer Ian Rosenberg (2021) described her use of provocative messages as a "trademark", while British author Lucy O'Brien (2019) described her style as "confrontational".

=== Controversies and criticism ===
Madonna has faced criticism and controversy over some of her charitable efforts, public statements, political endorsements, and work addressing political and social issues.

Clarence Page of the Chicago Tribune commented in 1985 that rock stars are expected to receive criticism from conservatives, but defined Madonna's case as remarkable for a nonpolitical woman and in the "pantheon of popular culture", as she "causes a stir" in the "camps of both political extremes". In Madonna's later career, observers such as Cynthia Reynolds of Maclean's (2004) argued that "celebrities are fickle, and so are trends, even among good causes" referring to Madonna and other high-profile celebrities. In an op-ed for CNN in 2013, Andrew Mwenda discussed the growing involvement of celebrities in humanitarian causes in developing countries, particularly in Africa, and criticized Madonna and other celebrities involved in such campaigns. He argued, among other things, that their efforts seemed to prioritize celebrities' public image over the welfare of the people.

==== Political ====
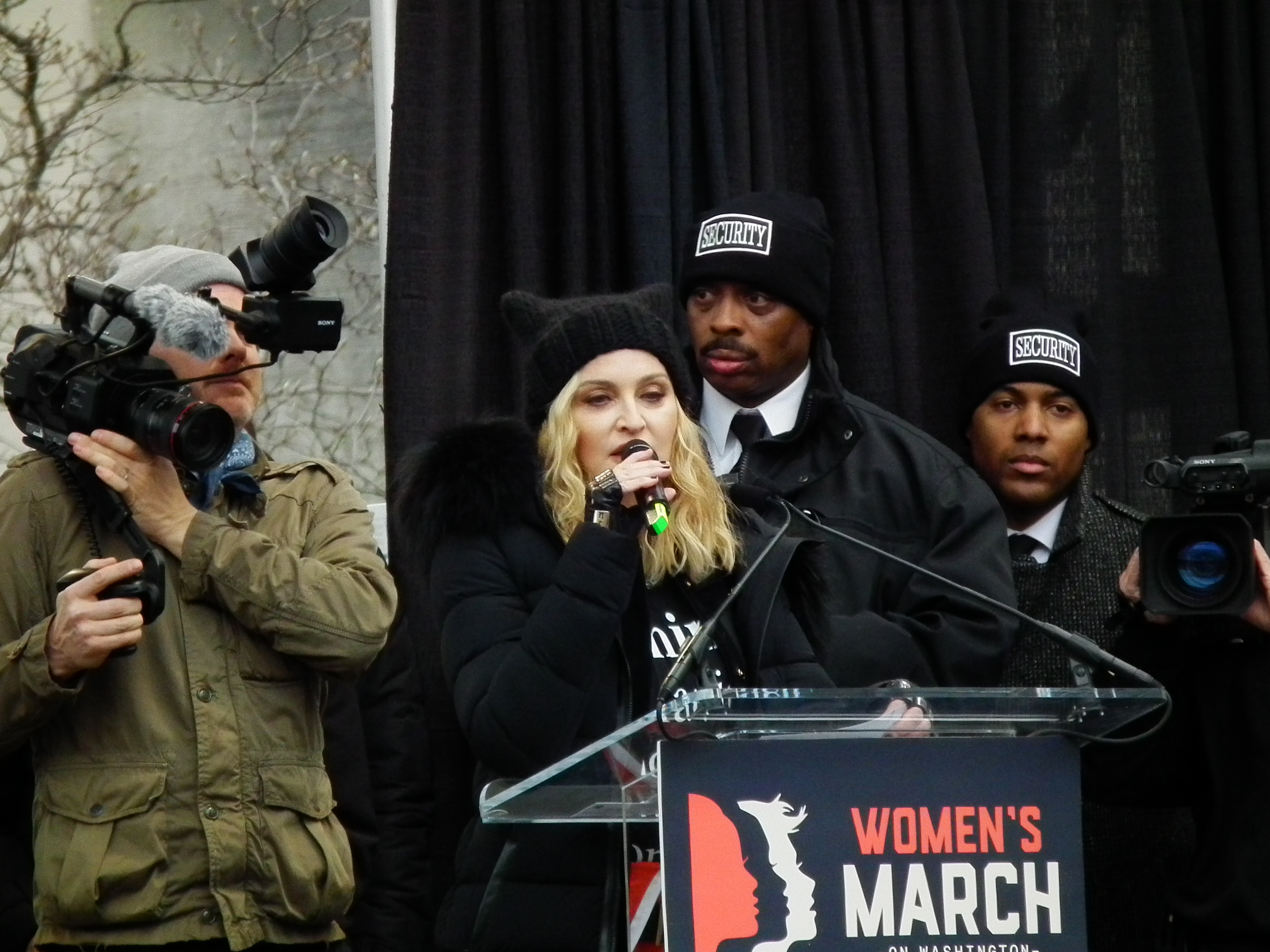
Madonna during the 2017 Women's March, a rally against Donald Trump.

Internationally, Madonna's advocacy of Russian gay rights and support for the jailed members of feminist punk group Pussy Riot drew criticism from Russian politicians during the MDNA Tour in 2012. That same year, Madonna's criticism of French politician Marine Le Pen and her view of what she described as rising xenophobia and far-right movements in France and across Europe also drew criticism from France's National Rally.

In the United States, the Veterans of Foreign Wars criticized Madonna for what the organization described as a desecration of the American flag in her video for the inaugural Rock the Vote in 1990. Madonna's publicist responded, stating, "she's trying to get that message across in a humorous, dramatic way. But she's very serious about the issue". In October 2016, while introducing comedian Amy Schumer at Madison Square Garden, Madonna "promised" oral sex to voters who would vote for Hillary Clinton, the Democratic presidential nominee.

Madonna drew controversy by comparing Republican presidential candidate John McCain to Adolf Hitler in a video shown during the Sticky & Sweet Tour (2008). According to a Reuters report, the Anti-Defamation League issued a statement condemning it and McCain's campaign characterized the comparison as "outrageous, unacceptable and crudely divisive". American writer David Horowitz took a dim view on the issue, stating: "We're in a sad situation if we're turning to entertainers for political wisdom".

During the 2017 Women's March, a demonstration held in opposition to the presidency of Donald Trump, Madonna delivered a speech in which she used profanity repeating the phrase "fuck you" three times. She also stated: "Yes I have thought an awful lot about blowing up the White House, but I know that this won't change anything. We cannot fall into despair". Her remarks attracted widespread attention and criticism. Madonna subsequently clarified that she is not a "violent person" and defended her stance by saying that she was just speaking metaphorically. American politician Newt Gingrich, former speaker of the United States House of Representatives, criticized her speech, characterizing Madonna as part of what he called an "emerging leftwing fascism" and compared her tone to a "young fascist who ran around town breaking windows". In an interview with Fox News, Donald Trump, expressed: "Honestly, she's disgusting. I think she hurt herself very badly. I think she hurt that whole cause". The Texas radio station, Hits 105, banned her music from its airwaves, with general manager Terry Thomas describing the decision as a matter of patriotism rather than politics.

According to media reports, Madonna was among several American musicians, including Taylor Swift, Olivia Rodrigo and Billie Eilish who publicly responded in 2022 to the reversal of Roe v. Wade, concerning abortion rights. American political magazine The American Spectator subsequently criticized the celebrities' responses, characterizing them as "progressive", and questioned their influence on "changing the public's way of thinking".

==== Sexuality and other issues ====
Madonna's sexual image has often attracted media attention and prompted criticism. Nicole Hensley of New York Daily News commented in 2016 that she has a "history of pushing sexually suggestive motifs to encourage young people to complete their civic duty". Early in her career in 1985, American actress Bette Midler introduced her to the global audience of the Live Aid as a "woman who pulled herself up by her bra straps and has been known to let them down occasionally". Media outlets such as Billboard interpreted the remark as a reference to Madonna's pre-fame nude photos that Playboy and Penthouse ran weeks earlier. Many people believed the rumor that Madonna was HIV-positive, including her then-husband Sean Penn. At an AIDS research gala in 1991, she addressed the rumors, saying: "I'm not HIV-positive but what if I were? I would be more afraid of how society would treat me for having the disease than the actual disease itself [...] If this is what I have to deal with for my involvement in fighting this epidemic, then so be it". Rolling Stone commented that her contributions to AIDS causes were relatively overlooked due to her marriage with Penn.

In addition, Madonna's association with Kabbalah, particularly her involvement with the Kabbalah Centre, has attracted criticism. The Centre has been described as a "money-driven cult". In 2008, UNICEF faced criticism following a Madonna-hosted fundraising event, with some commentators arguing that the event also served to "promote" The Centre and Gucci. According to The Guardian, Madonna rejected allegations that the event involved commercial interests. The Nyasa Times reported that Madonna's visit to Malawi in 2021 to meet President Lazarus Chakwera drew criticism on social media after videos showed her sitting on tables and engaging in what critics described as dancing "antics", with some alleging that she was "spreading the virtues of the Kabbalah sect of Judaism" to the Malawian head of state.

Madonna's announcement and decision to perform as an interval act at the Eurovision Song Contest 2019 in Tel Aviv drew backlash from Palestinian activists, scholars, and groups such as PACBI and BDS. Madonna subsequently addressed the criticism in a social media post. The performance was characterized as "politically charged" by Andrew Trendell of NME and received mixed reviews according to the BBC.

==== Social media activity ====
In Madonna's later career, some of her social media posts drew criticism from media outlets and the public. In April 2021, The Advocate's Neal Broverman described reactions to a post about gun control as "mixed", highlighting that a user called her an "out-of-touch millionaire who has no right to an opinion on the matter", also noting that Madonna later responded to the user's message. Madonna's social media posts related to and made during the COVID-19 lockdowns often generated controversy. According to The Washington Post, she began posting her "quarantine diaries" in March 2020, making often "controversial claims". She faced backlash after describing the coronavirus as "the great equalizer" that "made us all equal in many ways" in a video she filmed while sitting nude in a bathtub filled with rose petals at her home, with some critics characterizing her remarks as "out of touch". Madonna received criticism after endorsing a video of Stella Immanuel (member of the self-dubbed America's Frontline Doctors) that promoted hydroxychloroquine as a vaccine for Covid as well the doctor's claims that wearing a mask was unnecessary. The video posted on July 2020 was removed from Madonna's social media accounts and labeled as misinformation by the platforms.

=== Madonna's efforts in Malawi ===
==== Financial management controversy ====
According to Harvard Business Review (2011), Raising Malawi and Madonna became the subject of "headlines around the world" as a result of an abandoned project to construct a school worth over $15 million, and with a stated number of $3.8 million lost in the effort guaranteed. Media reports speculated that the collapse may have been linked to the Kabbalah Centre and its co-founder, Michael Berg, citing an expenditure of $3 million by The Kabbalah Centre of Los Angeles. The Centre itself was audited soon after for tax fraud. On April 2011, the New York Daily News reported that The Centre's Success For Kids (a project also supported by Madonna) was under scrutiny by the FBI. On May 2011, Today reported that Madonna had previously denied being under investigation by the FBI and the IRS. According to media reports, she relocated her charity's offices away from the Centre's headquarters and removed advisers linked to the Kabbalah Centre from her charity's board.

Following the project's unsuccessful outcome, Madonna hired the consulting firm Global Philanthropy Group to manage its operations. Together with buildOn, they helped Raising Malawi pursue a new approach, which included the development of smaller schools. The Harvard Business Review dedicated an article titled "Avoiding the Madonna Effect in Philanthropy" (2011) where it was stated "in philanthropy, failure is an almost daily occurrence".

==== Adoptions and child trafficking concerns ====
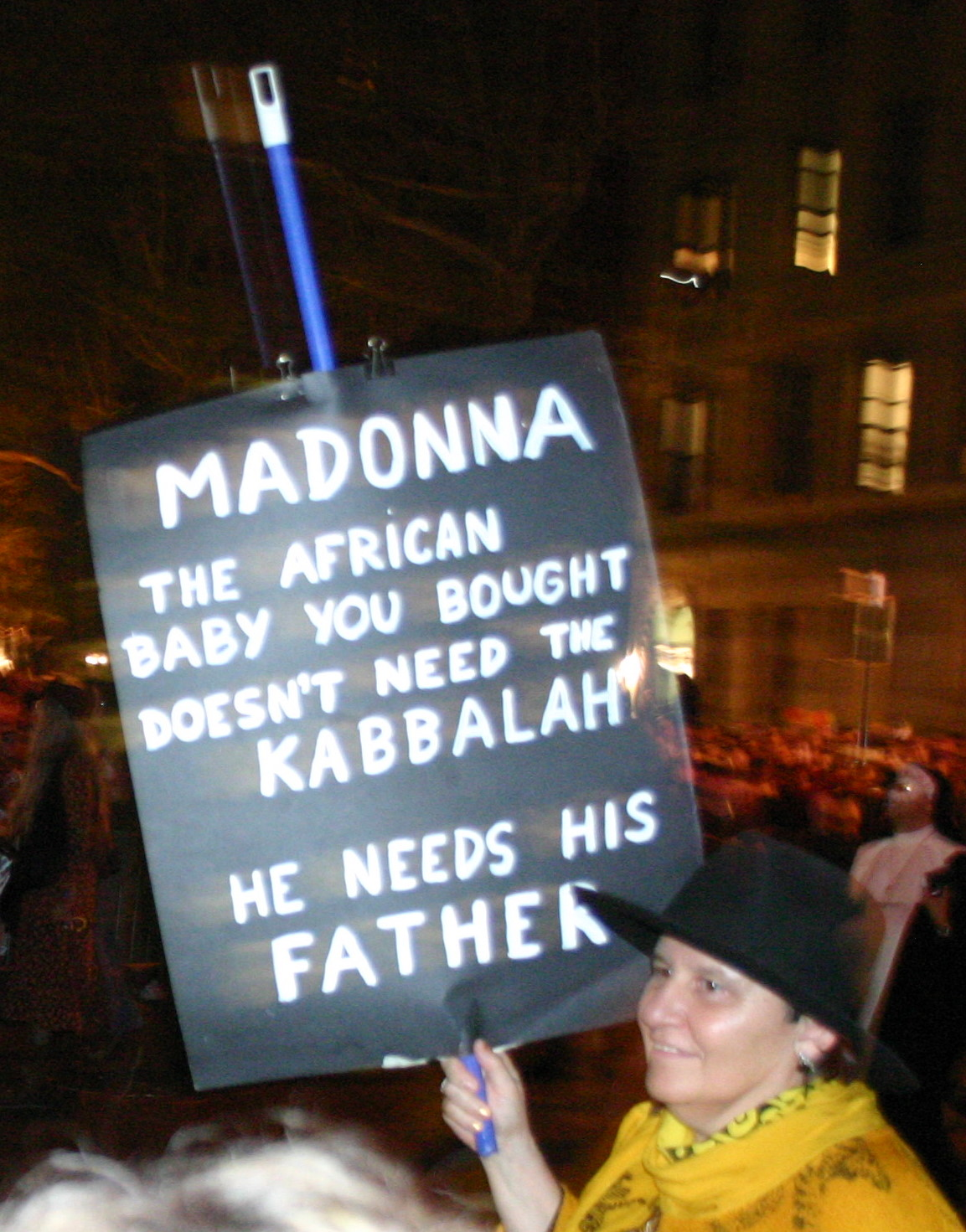
A woman showing her disapproval of Madonna's 2006 adoption of David Banda

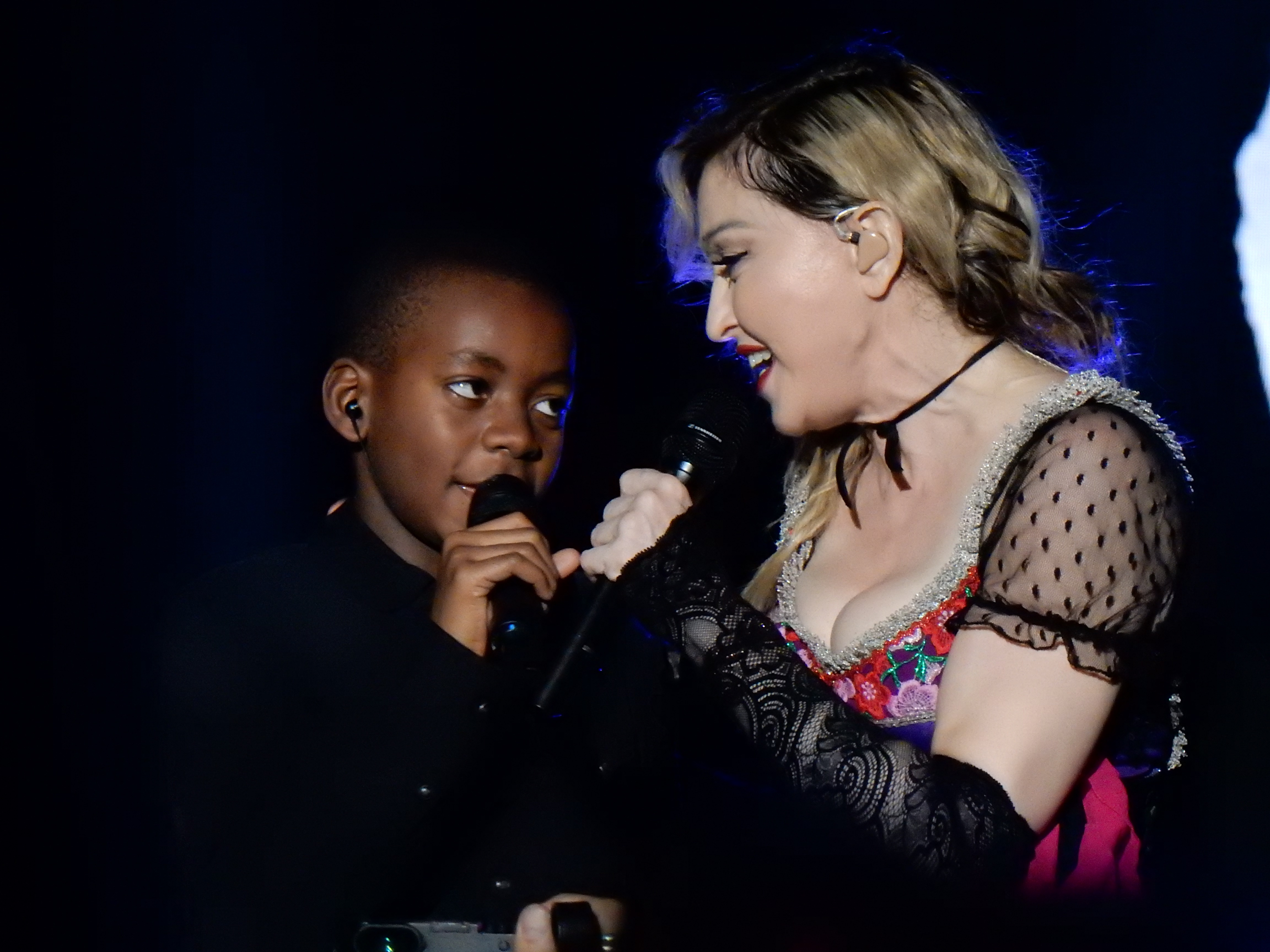
Madonna next to David Banda, her first adopted Malawian child in 2006, seen on stage during the 2015 Rebel Heart Tour

In 2006, Madonna and her then-husband Guy Ritchie adopted the Malawian child David Banda, drawing a "significant amount of media and public attention". As a result of the "highly publicized" process, The Guardian dubbed Banda "the most famous baby in the world". Some critics speculated that Madonna had adopted the infant as a publicity stunt in connection with the ongoing Confessions Tour.

The adoption of Banda drew negative reactions, according to the Savannah Morning News. People accused Madonna of violating Malawian adoption laws, which generally requires applicants to have resided in the country for at least 18 months, as well as of failing to adopt a "true orphan". Madonna later adopted more children, one in 2009, and two in 2017. She was grilled by Fiona Mwale, the judge in Malawi, in 2016 concerning her motives for adopting more children. Mwale was convinced that Madonna was "motivated by her desire to offer a home, love, protection and guidance to the infants."

Madonna and Angelina Jolie are credited with popularizing celebrity adoptions in the early decade of the twenty-first century. Her adoptions generated discussions and attracted criticism among activists, organizations, and the media. After her application to adopt in 2009, Madonna generated "fresh controversy" again over foreign adoptions, according to France 24. Following Madonna's petition, the High Court of Malawi stated that her adoption could open the door to the trafficking of children. When Madonna revealed her plans to adopt again in 2017, some activists expressed concern that her actions "would facilitate the child trafficking in Africa", according to Reuters. By January 2023, the Ethiopian World Federation had accused Madonna of possible "human trafficking and social experiments", involving her adopted Malawian children, citing her public behavior and photographs of Banda recreating one of her outfits at a public event. The federation expressed concern about Madonna's publication of Sex in 1992, her first book, in which she wrote about her sexual fantasies. They requested to Lazarus Chakwera, then President of Malawi, to prevent "homosexual and transgender" activities and investigate the integrity of Raising Malawi.

In 2008, researchers at the University of Liverpool coined the phrase "the Madonna effect" to describe international adoptions and its side effects. In his report, child psychologist Kevin Browne said that the Madonna-style process led to a rise in the number of children still in orphanages across Europe due to their being more adoptions made overseas rather than local. Researchers also stated that some parents in impoverished countries were handing over their children "in the belief that they will have a 'better life in the West'" with "a more wealthy family".

==== Malawians' perspectives ====
Madonna's activities in Malawi received mixed reactions. According to Karin Wilkins in Communicating Gender and Advocating Accountability in Global Development (2016), she has "frequently" been referred to as "Saint Madonna of Malawi" or "a gift from heaven". Lisa Ann Richey explained in Celebrity Humanitarianism and North-South Relations (2015), there are multiple local interpretations of her efforts, pointing out that some Malawians interpret Madonna as a "person who cynically exploit poor Africans to promote her own brand and who makes grand promises that never materialize" while others see her as a "worthy humanitarian".

Madonna's organization and efforts got the government's attention. In the early 2010s, Malawian president Joyce Banda criticized Madonna over what Banda described as demands for VIP treatment and stated that Madonna had exaggerated her efforts. Banda also stated that Madonna felt her charitable work meant that Malawi should "be forever chained to the obligation of gratitude". Madonna subsequently described Banda's statements as "inaccurate" and stated it would not interfere with her commitments. Madonna further suggested that the government's criticism was related to the dismissal of Banda's sister, Anjimile Oponyo, who had previously served as a head of Raising Malawi, and was removed amid controversy concerning the organization's financial management.

== See also ==
- List of philanthropists

== Book sources ==
- Anguelov, Nikolay (2015). The Dirty Side of the Garment Industry: Fast Fashion and Its Negative Impact on Environment and Society. CRC Press. ISBN 978-1498712231.
- Bego, Mark (1998). Pop Culture Presents the Story Of Jewel. Power Publishing. ISBN 0825616859.
- Benstock, Shari; Ferriss, Suzanne (1994). On Fashion. Rutgers University Press. ISBN 0813520339.
- Cramer, Alfred William (2009). Musicians and Composers of the 20th Century. Salem Press. ISBN 978-1587655159.
- Cross, Mary (2007). Madonna: A Biography. Greenwood Publishing Group. ISBN 978-0313338113.
- Geczy, Adam; Karaminas, Vicki (2021). Gaga Aesthetics: Art, Fashion, Popular Culture, and the Up-Ending of Tradition. Bloomsbury Publishing. ISBN 978-1350102705.
- Gnojewski, Carol (2017). Madonna: Fighting for Self-Expression. Enslow Publishing. ISBN 978-0766092556.
- Gulick, Rebecca (1993). Madonna: Portrait of a Material Girl. Courage Books. ISBN 1561382361.
- Hamill, Pete (2009). Piecework: Writings on Men & Women, Fools and Heroes, Lost Cities, Vanished Calamities and How the Weather Was. Hachette. ISBN 978-0316082952.
- Havranek, Carrie (2009). Women Icons of Popular Music. Greenwood Press. ISBN 978-0313340857.
- Hegde, Radha S. (2011). Circuits of Visibility: Gender and Transnational Media Cultures. NYU Press. ISBN 978-0814737309.
- Hodge, Susie; Moore, Gareth (2019). The Art Puzzle Book. Frances Lincoln. ISBN 978-0711252646.
- Jenkins, Henry; Peters-Lazaro, Gabriel; Shresthova, Sangita (2020). Popular Culture and the Civic Imagination: Case Studies of Creative Social Change. NYU Press. ISBN 978-1479847204.
- Kellner, Douglas (2003). Media Spectacle. Psychology Press. ISBN 041526829X.
- Luckman, Michael (2010). Alien Rock: The Rock 'n' Roll Extraterrestrial Connection. Simon & Schuster. ISBN 978-1451604320.
- Luttrell, Regina (2021). Social Media: How to Engage, Share, and Connect. Rowman & Littlefield. ISBN 978-1538154434.
- Mongeon, Bridgette (2015). 3D Technology in Fine Art and Craft: Exploring 3D Printing, Scanning, Sculpting and Milling. CRC Press. ISBN 1317549031.
- Morgan, Michelle (2015). Madonna. Hachette UK. ISBN 978-1472119438.
- Morton, Andrew (2001). Madonna. St. Martin's Press. ISBN 0312287860.
- O'Brien, Lucy (2018). Madonna: Like an Icon. Random House. ISBN 978-1446437384.
- O'Brien, Lucy (2019). Madonna: Like an Icon, Updated Edition. HarperCollins. ISBN 978-0062939470.
- Richey, Lisa Ann (2015). Celebrity Humanitarianism and North-South Relations: Politics, place and power. Routledge. ISBN 978-1317521235.
- Robertson, Pamela (1996). Guilty pleasures: feminist camp from Mae West to Madonna. I.B. Tauris. ISBN 1860640877.
- Rojek, Chris (2012). Fame Attack: The Inflation of Celebrity and Its Consequences. A&C Black. ISBN 978-1849660716.
- Rolling Stone Press (1997). Madonna, the Rolling Stone Files. Hyperion. ISBN 0786881542.
- Rosenberg, Ian (2021). The Fight for Free Speech: Ten Cases That Define Our First Amendment Freedoms. NYU Press. ISBN 978-1479801541.
- Tester, Keith (2010). Humanitarianism and Modern Culture. Penn State University Press. ISBN 978-0271037356.
- Van Den Bulck, Hilde (2018). Celebrity Philanthropy and Activism. Routledge. ISBN 978-1315306858.
- Wayne, Tiffany K. (2014). Women's Rights in the United States. ABC-CLIO. ISBN 978-1610692151.
- Wilkins, Karin (2016). Communicating Gender and Advocating Accountability in Global Development. Springer Science+Business Media. ISBN 978-1137450487.
- Wilson, Japhy (2014). Jeffrey Sachs: The Strange Case of Dr. Shock and Mr. Aid. Verso Books. ISBN 978-1781683293.
