= Camp Adventure =

Camp Adventure USA was a program run by the University of Northern Iowa that sends American college students to American military bases, embassies, and British Military installations throughout the world. These students are taught to "Create Magic Moments that last a lifetime". They run day camps, swim lessons, as well as overnight and sports camps for the children of military personnel, ranging from age 0–18. Counselors also act as lifeguards for the children of military personnel stationed on bases.

Camp Adventure was founded at the University of Oregon in 1985. At its inception, the program sent 12 students to three sites in Korea. In 1997, it sent approximately 600 students to 118 program sites in 16 countries, including United Kingdom, Russia, Germany, Italy, Spain, Belgium, the Netherlands, Korea, Japan, Okinawa, Hong Kong, People's Republic of China, Taiwan, and the United States. In 2011, it sent approximately 1,300 students to 20 countries. At the end of 2019 over 1,400 students were working through Camp Adventure in over 120 placement locations in 17+ countries. Some of the largest sites were in Oahu, Hawaii; Okinawa, Japan; and Germany. New sites were established almost every year. All locations varied greatly in living accommodations, number of campers, camp styles, etc.

All Camp Adventure counselors are trained in games, songs, skits and first aid, lifeguarding, mandatory reporting, CPR, AED, and blood borne pathogens, as well as how to deal with the problems that many military children have due to the isolation, frequent moves, and dangerous profession of their parents. Aquatics staff are also trained in Water Safety Instruction as well as other extensive aquatic skills. There are other specialties, such as Sports Camp, Teen Center (ages 13–18), and CDC (Child Development Center for ages 0–5). Child Development staff internship positions were also open in the fall and spring semesters as well as during winter and summer breaks in many locations.

The counselors train for several months during the spring semester at the University of Northern Iowa and other universities across the nation, including California State University, Chico, California State University, Sacramento, University of California, Davis, Albany State University, Florida A & M University, Iowa State University, University of Iowa, University of Oregon, Oregon State University, San Diego State University, University of Toledo, and Washington State University. They were then sent to the destination for the summer, usually for 10 weeks. The counselors reported directly to their camp director on site, who reported to the project coordinator, who oversaw multiple sites in the same geographic region. The project coordinator reported to the program director, who supervised all sites and all programs in a continent. Students were responsible for their own passport and visas, but the program provided transportation, room/board, and a living stipend of $25/day. An extensive background check was performed on all counselor applicants. All directors are at least 21 years of age, and camp counselors are at least 18 years of age, and all project coordinators and program directors had a bachelor's degree, and were usually enrolled in graduate school.

Although the program was based at the University of Northern Iowa, Camp Adventure Youth Services students come from over 80 colleges and universities to participate in this service-learning program that allowed them to gain skills and experience related to youth services and program management.

Counselors receive up to 12 hours of college credit for participating in the program.

On March 6, 2020, Camp Adventure announced that all 2020 summer programs would be cancelled and all staff currently in the field would be recalled due to COVID-19. Camp Adventure participants were informed of Camp Adventure's 2020 summer program cancellation on March 12, 2020.

Through 35 years of operation, Camp Adventure served the needs of military families. College students gained work experience and broadened their understanding of the world.

Camp Adventure permanently shut down operations in 2020.
