= Ray of Light Foundation =

American non-profit organization

- Industry: Non-profit
- Founded: 1998
- Founder: Madonna
- Headquarters: Los Angeles, U.S.
- Area served: Worldwide
- Key people: Melanie Ciccone (trustee)
- Website: rayoflight.org

The Ray of Light Foundation is a non-profit charity organization that was established in 1998 by American singer-songwriter Madonna. The foundation takes its name from Madonna's seventh studio album, Ray of Light, released in 1998. Its primary mission is to "promote peace, equal rights, and education for all." The organization's key areas of focus include women's empowerment, education initiatives, global development, and various humanitarian efforts.

== Foundation ==
After contributing to various charitable organizations, Madonna decided to establish her own in 1998 and named it after her seventh studio album, Ray of Light (1998). The foundation is based in Los Angeles, California, with Melanie Ciccone (Madonna's sister) working as its trustee. According to Sarah Ezzy from Global Philanthropy Group, she "alone" funds the organization. The foundation's primary focus areas are women, education, international development, and humanitarian concerns.

== Selected charitable activities ==
=== Eurasia ===
The Ray of Light Foundation has contributed to programs in Eurasia such as teacher salaries in Gaza Strip schools through the United Nations Relief and Works Agency for Palestine Refugees in the Near East (UNRWA) and microloans to female farmers through the Palestine Fair Trade Association. The foundation also supports Americans for Peace Now, which advocates for a diplomatic solution to the Israeli–Palestinian conflict. The Ray of Light Foundation assisted 2,600 Palestine refugee girls in gaining access to inclusive and high-quality education in the Gaza Strip, according to the UNRWA 2018 annual report. Following Madonna's donation to the COVID-19 vaccine in 2020, the foundation provided financial assistance to American Near East Refugee Aid.

=== The Americas ===
In the Americas, the foundation contributed to the Community Organized Relief Effort in Haiti, an organization founded by her former husband Sean Penn which Madonna visited in 2013. The following year, Madonna donated to three Detroit organizations: Detroit Achievement Academy & Detroit Prep, Downtown Boxing Gym and the Empowerment Plan, with supplies such as iPods and iPads, as well as money, to assist in the construction of a boxing gym. Furthermore, the foundation has supported causes for artists suffering from health issues as well as medical research and health organizations. By 2007, it was reported that Madonna had made small donations to various health organizations, including TJ Martell Foundation for Leukemia and Cancer Research and also to All Saints Church.

=== Africa ===
In Africa, the foundation has supported Madonna's Raising Malawi charity organization, Shining Hope for Communities in Kenya, and the creation of Mali's first secondary school with buildOn. It assisted the Global Fund for Women in Nigeria with the Chibok schoolgirls kidnapping in 2014, and the International Organization for Migration in 2016.

=== Other campaigns ===
In 2019, the Ray of Light Foundation joined a partnership with the National LGBTQ Task Force to expand that group's "violence prevention work, especially as it affects transgender women of color."
