= Jim Ziolkowski =

Jim Ziolkowski is the founder, president and CEO of buildOn, an international nonprofit organization that runs youth service learning programs in urban U.S. high schools and constructs schools and promotes literacy in developing countries. He is the best-selling author of “Walk in Their Shoes: Can One Person Change the World?” According to the companies financial 2022 form 990 report Jim was paid $439,039 and an estimated $38,727 from the organization and other related organizations.

== Early life ==
Ziolkowski was raised in Jackson, Michigan. He grew up in a Roman Catholic family and has credited his faith with influencing his later humanitarian work.

In 1989, Ziolkowski graduated cum laude from Michigan State University with a bachelor's degree in Finance. Ziolkowski spent a significant part of the next year traveling the world and witnessing extreme poverty and the suffering caused by it. While backpacking in Nepal, he came upon an isolated village celebrating the opening of a new school. Ziolkowski credited the hope he witnessed in this community from increased access to education as an experience that led him to later found buildOn.

After returning to the United States, Ziolkowski began a career in corporate finance with General Electric (GE) as part of its Financial Management Professionals program, an intensive two-year program that grooms recent college grads for GE leadership roles.

Inspired by his own travels to some of the world's most economically impoverished countries, Ziolkowski soon quit his job at GE to found Building with Books (which later became buildOn) with the objective of building schools in developing countries and creating youth service learning programs in America's underserved urban neighborhoods. Building with Books constructed its first school in 1991 in Bairro Liberdade, Brazil, followed by schools in Malawi and Nepal.

In 1997, after returning from a school building project in Malawi in which he narrowly survived malaria, Ziolkowski decided to put an increased focus on Building with Books’ U.S. service learning programs. Seeking to identify with urban U.S. students in a more meaningful way, Ziolkowski spent the next three years living in Harlem, New York.

== buildOn ==
Ziolkowski has stated that his personal goal and the mission of buildOn, the international service learning organization he founded, is to break the cycle of poverty, illiteracy and low expectations through service and education. According to buildOn's website, the organization currently constructs schools in seven developing countries on four continents - Burkina Faso, Haiti, Malawi, Mali, Nepal, Nicaragua and Senegal.

buildOn also organizes youth service learning programs in seven urban areas in the United States: Boston; Bridgeport, Connecticut; Detroit; Chicago; New York City and the San Francisco Bay Area. Students participating in these programs volunteer in their own communities serving in direct service projects, such as feeding the homeless and caring for the elderly and people with disabilities, and indirect service projects, such as boarding blighted buildings and cleaning up public spaces. Some students in buildOn's service learning programs are also given the opportunity to participate in the building of an international school, through buildOn's “Trek for Knowledge" program.

In 2010, Brandeis University conducted a study of one of buildOn's programs in the Bronx, New York. buildOn subsequently published these findings, which support a causal link between the personal skills buildOn's service learning programs focus on and improved academic achievement.

buildOn is based in Stamford, Connecticut, and has a four-star rating from Charity Navigator.

== Walk in Their Shoes: Can One Person Change the World? ==
Ziolkowski authored the New York Times bestselling education book “Walk in their Shoes: Can One Person Change the World?” in 2013. The book tells the story of Ziolkowski and buildOn's mission to change the world one community at a time by building schools in developing countries and empowering youth from challenging urban areas through service learning programs in the U.S., as well as stories of the people who have been affected by buildOn's work.

Walk in Their Shoes received a 2014 Christopher Award and ranked on the New York Times Education list. Ziolkowski has shared his story with numerous corporations including Google, Microsoft and General Electric and presented at TED Long Beach. He has also spoken at numerous high schools and universities including St. John's University, where the book was read by all incoming freshmen during the 2013-14 school year.

== Awards and Acknowledgements ==
Ziolkowski has been featured on NBC's TODAY Show, MSNBC's Morning Joe, PBS, Fast Company, and CBS Evening News. In fall of 2010, Ziolkowski was named one of Catholic Digest's Catholic Heroes.
