= Eduardo Kobra =

Brazilian painter

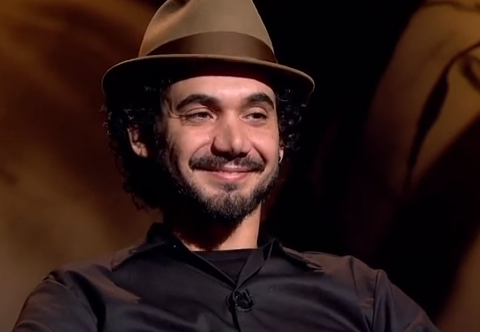
- Born: Carlos Eduardo Fernandes Léo; August 27, 1975 (age 51); São Paulo, Brazil
- Occupation: Muralist
- Years active: 1987–present
- Known for: Urban Art and Activism
- Website: http://www.eduardokobra.com/

Carlos Eduardo Fernandes Léo (born August 27, 1975, in São Paulo, Brazil), known as Eduardo Kobra, nicknamed Kobra, is a street artist who officially began his career in 1987 at 11 years old, in his hometown of São Paulo. Since then he has painted over 3,000 murals on five different continents. Some of these murals are commissioned while others are his original, raw ideas. Kobra now works with a team of artists who paint between two and four murals each month. To this day Kobra continues to live and work in his hometown of São Paulo.

== Early life ==
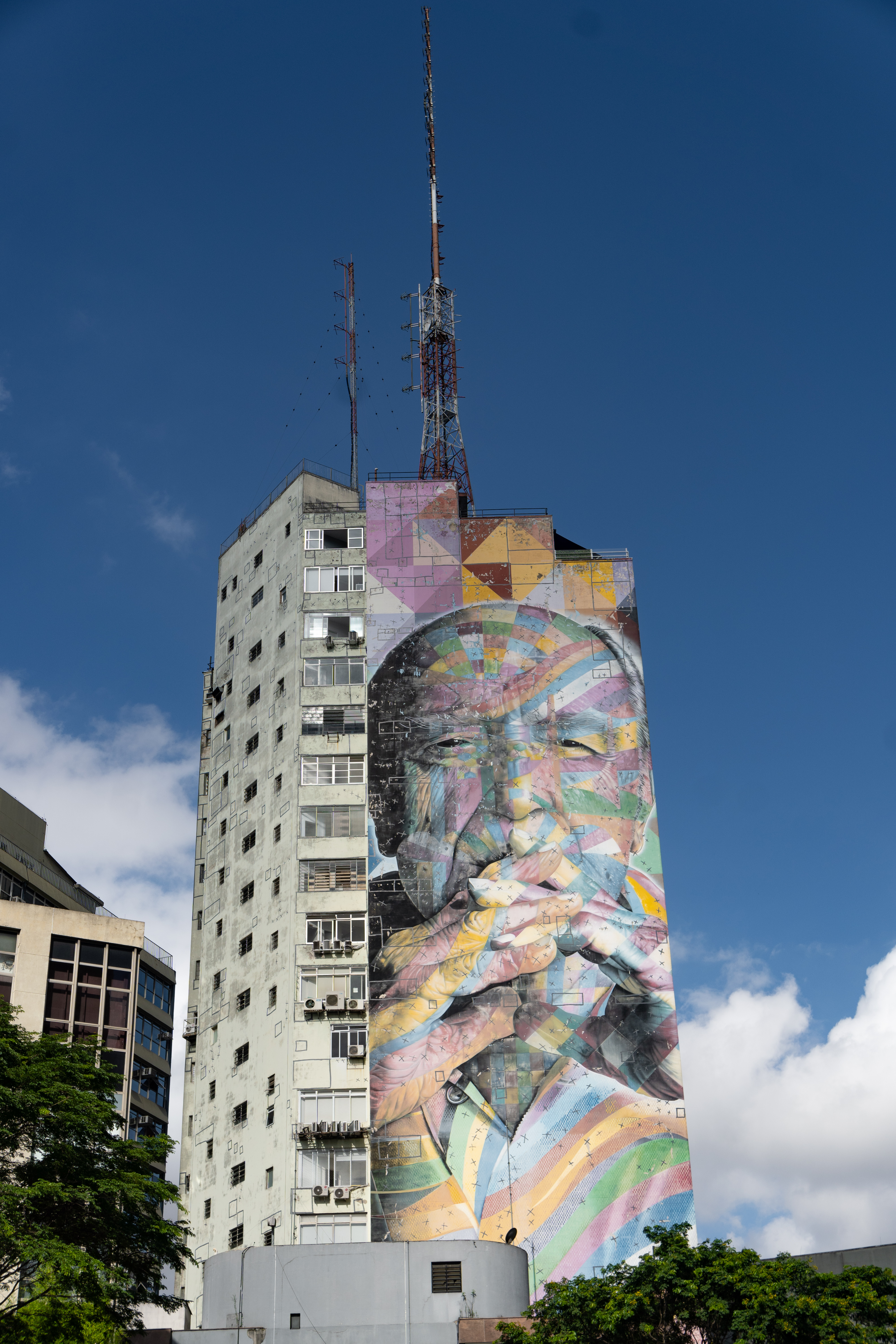
Portrait of Oscar Niemeyer by Eduardo Kobra, on a building in São Paulo.

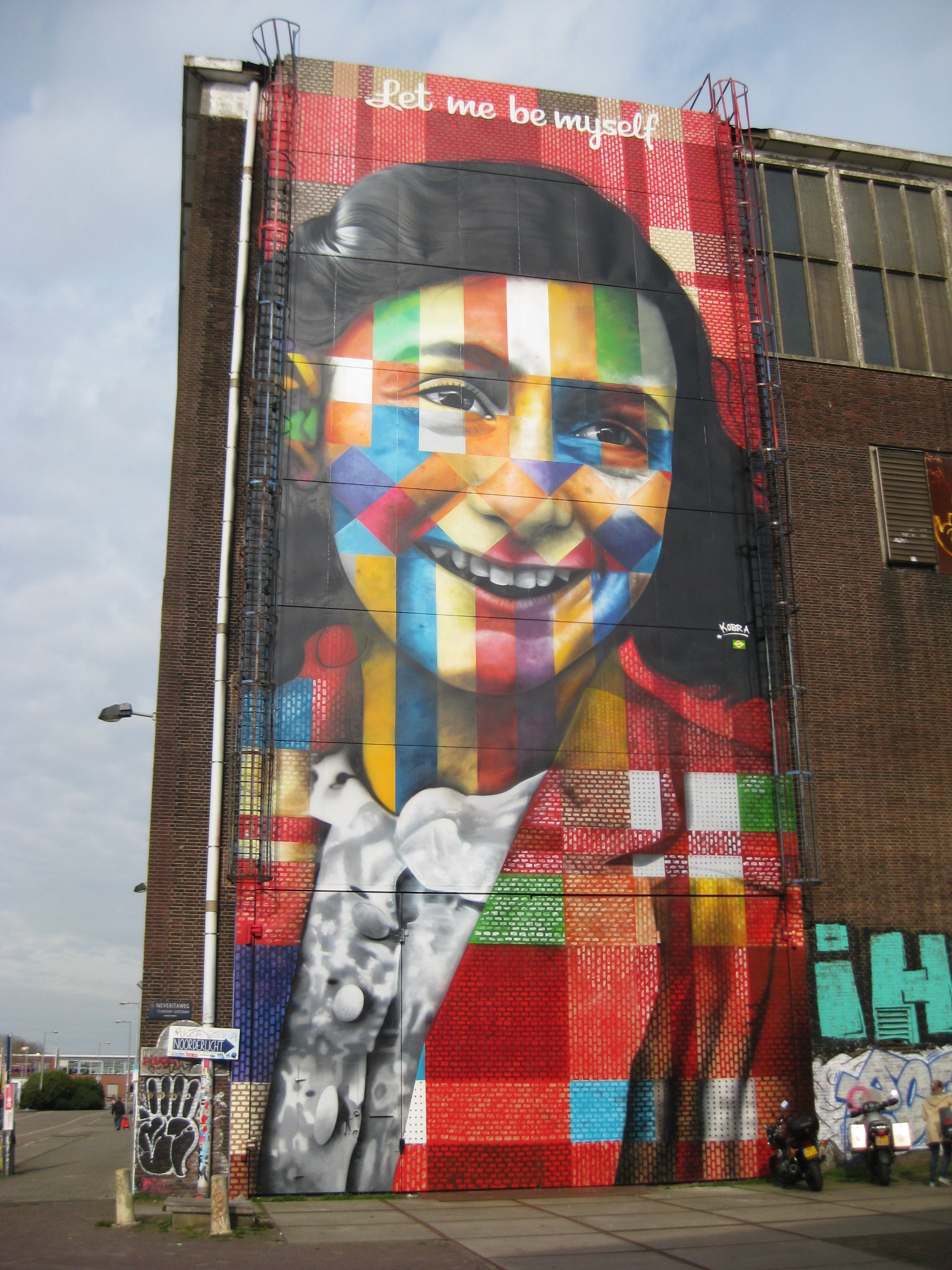
Let Me Be Myself (Anne Frank), street art by Eduardo Kobra in Amsterdam.

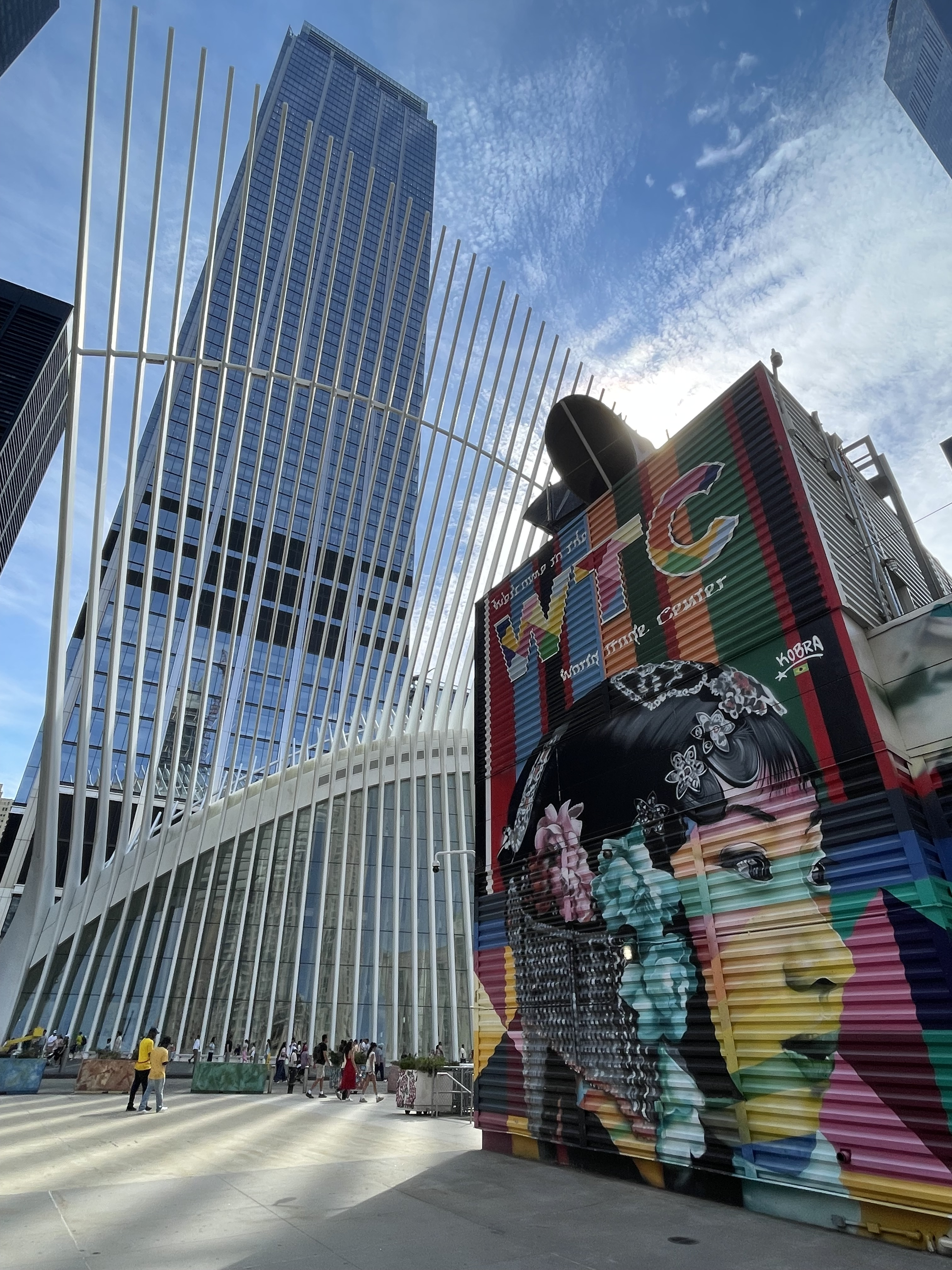
Kobra mural at the World Trade Center, New York

Bob Dylan panels by Eduardo Kobra in Minneapolis, Minnesota

Eduardo Kobra grew up in São Paulo, Brazil's largest city. His father was a weaver and his mother was a housewife. He attended public school at Escola Municipal Mauricio Simão. He did not get any official academic training, but became a well known, self-taught artist. Before he started his official art career, he enjoyed illegally tagging walls which eventually lead to several arrests throughout his teenage years.

== Career ==
Eduardo Kobra was influenced by both modern and contemporary artists all around the world. He was specifically influenced by muralists such as Banksy, Keith Haring and Diego Rivera. His artwork is highly research driven. He rooted his artworks in art history by painting famous artworks in his own style in hopes of not only inserting himself into history but also bringing awareness to São Paulo as a town. He researched the science behind human vision, architecture, urban space and tri-dimensional projects because he wanted to understand how to effectively paint in order to give his viewer a specific experience. Before painting a work that is site specific, he researches the history and culture of the city in order to situate the art in a city conclusively. Eduardo Kobra uses his own technique when it comes to street art. This technique involves airbrush and spray paint.

The main goal of his work is to provide a space for the public to interact with his art. He did not want the public to have to go to a museum to see art, he wanted it to be accessible to all, thus pushing back against the difference between high and low art. During his teenage years Kobra ran with a well-known graffiti group known as "Hip Hop" in São Paulo which was who he began experimenting with street art as a career. By the 1990s Kobra made São Paulo the main site for contemporary street art. During this time, he began making posters for events that were held at the largest amusement park in Brazil, which was his first paid art job. The advertising he did for the amusement park was so successful that he began getting asked by other companies to produce advertisements for them.

In the early 2000s Kobra created his Memory Walls project. The goal of this project was to transform the appearance of an urban space through the means of a piece of art while also bringing back the lost memories of the city. He incorporated old photos of São Paulo that he spread throughout the town integrated within his trademark graffiti. This project was made up of smaller murals distributed throughout the city telling the story of the history of São Paulo while also showing the stark contrast between past São Paulo and the present São Paulo. In total, he used 10,000 square feet of space distributed around the city to complete his project. In 2007 the media got a hold of this project and began waiting with anticipation for what his next project would be.

In 2011, Kobra painted his first mural outside of Brazil in France. France invited him to come paint on a wall in a neighborhood on Lyon, France, that was revived. They wanted to remember this time in their history and show the process of their revival in hopes of never losing sight of what their neighborhood has been through. In 2017, Madonna invited Kobra to paint two murals at Mercy James Institute for Pediatric Surgery and Intensive Care in Malawi after she saw his Fight for Street Art mural in Williamsburg, Brooklyn, which depicts Andy Warhol and Jean-Michel Basquiat. In 2021, Kobra created a large-scale work depicting five women, each representing one of the continents (Africa, America, Asia, Europe, Oceania) at the World Trade Center, New York City.

His career has continued as he is a still a practicing artist, painting in different countries around the world. His portrait of television journalist Glória Maria was unveiled in Glória Maria Municipal Park in 2024.

=== Legacy ===
In 2016 Kobra painted the then largest mural titled Ethnic Groups which celebrated the 2016 Olympic games. Then in 2017 he surpassed his own record when he painted a street mural that was 5,742 square meters.

Kobra has worked for a number of large organizations including Playcenter, Beto Carrero World, Coca-Cola, Nestlé, Chevrolet, Ford, and Johnnie Walker.

== Work ==
The following table lists Kobra's major works.

Title	Location	Year
Raoni	Portugal	2017
Dali	Murcia, Spain	2017
La Familia Monet	Boulogne sur Mer, France	2017
Madela	Malawi	2017
Riches of St. Louis	Sao Luis, State of Maranhão	2017
Gandhi	Mumbai, India	2017
David	Carrara, Italy	2017
Christ	Tokyo, Japan	2016
Muddy	Chicago, US	2016
We Are All One (Ethnicities)	Rio de Janeiro, Brazil	2016
Bedouin	Dubai, United Arab Emirates	2016
Let Me Be Myself (Anne Frank)	Amsterdam, Netherlands	2016
Stop Wars	Miami, United States	2015
The Legend of Brazil	São Paulo, Brazil	2015
Looks At Peace	Los Angeles, United States	2015
Hamlet	Palm Beach, United States	2015
Gonzaga	Recife, Brazil	2015
Great Bike Riding	São Paulo, Brazil	2015
Club 27	São Paulo, Brazil	2015
Ziggy Stardust	Jersey City, United States	2015
The Times They are a-changin', Bob Dylan	Minneapolis, United States	2015
Neil Armstrong	Cincinnati, United States	2015
Mariarte	Mexico	2014
Rubinstein	Lodz, Poland	2014
Rationals	São Paulo, Brazil	2014
The Thinker	São Paulo, Brazil	2014
Alfred Nobel	Boras, Sweden	2014
Malala	Rome, Italy	2014
Fight for Street Art	Brooklyn, United States	2014
O Candango	Brasilia, Brazil	2014
Tupac and Notorious B.I.G.	Miami, United States	2013
Ballet Dancer	Moscow, Russia	2013
Abraham Lincoln	Lexington, United States	2013
Oscar Niemeyer	São Paulo, Brazil	2013
The Kiss	New York, United States	2012-2016
Glória Maria	Rio de Janeiro, Brazil	2024

=== Analysis of individual artworks ===
- V-J Day in Time Square, 2012

Eduardo Kobra draws his inspiration for this work of art from Alfred Eisenstaedt's famous photograph taken in 1945 in New York. Kobra takes this artwork and situates it in its original historical context by painting a scene below his depiction of Sailor Kissing Woman, of Time Square in 1945 which was the same year this photo was taken. This artwork is a celebration of Japan’s surrender to the Allies, ending World War II. The colorfulness of Kobra's final product gave the original photograph life in contemporary society.

- Oscar Niemeyer, 2013

Painted in 2013, this is one of Kobra's biggest and most well-known murals. He painted Oscar Niemeyer on one of São Paulo's busiest street. This mural covers an entire side of the building and is 52 meters tall and took 40 days to complete. This mural depicts a famous Brazilian architect, Oscar Niemeyer who died at the age of 104 in 2012 and is meant to honor his legacy.

- Abraham Lincoln, 2013

Kobra was invited to paint a mural of Abraham Lincoln in his home state of Kentucky in 2013. He took the image from the famous statue of Lincoln which stands in the National Mall in Washington, D.C., and overlaid his own style. He painted this mural on the outside of a theater which evokes Lincoln's death, but by using the statue that honors his abolition of slavery the viewer is able to see how his influence has not died in the theater, but continues to live on.

- O Candango, 2014

Painted in 2014, in Brasilia, Brazil, this mural honors all of the labors who made it possible for Brasilia to be the capital of Brazil. Historically the building of the capital is credited to the President Juscelino Kubitschek who was the brain behind the Republic’s new seat which completely changed the economy of Brazil. What is often forgotten are the thousands of laborers who moved from all over the country to Brasilia to work for the government, enduring awful living conditions to make the capital of Brasilia possible. These were the individuals that Kobra believed needed to be honored because without them the capital would not have been possible.

- The Times They Are A-Changin', 2015

Painted in 2015, in Minneapolis, Minnesota this is a mural depicting Bob Dylan, native to Minnesota in three distinctive phases of his life on the outside of a remodeled office building known as housing ‘new-economy’ companies. Taking one of Bob Dylan’s famous quotes such as this and proclaiming it on the outside of a building where everyone can see it depicts that the economy is changing which changes the city as a whole.

- Olhares da Paz (Glimpses of Peace), 2015

Painted in 2015 in Los Angeles, California this mural reminds the viewer that there is still hope in the depraved world. The mural depicts individuals who have given hope to the world throughout their lives and honors them. Some of the individuals depicted include Mother Teresa, Malala Yousafzai, Martin Luther King Jr. and Dalai Lama.

== Exhibitions ==
The following table lists Kobra's major exhibitions.

Year	Title	Location	Type
2009	Eduardo Kobra	Salon National Des Beaux-Arts, Paris, France	Solo
2009	Production Panel	8th Architecture Biennale in São Paulo, Brazil	Group
2009	Urban Intervention in Painting in Three Demensions	São Paulo, Rio de Janeiro, Rio de Janeiro and Brazilia, DF, Brazil	Group
2009	Mural Celebrating the Birthday of São Paulo	São Paulo, Brazil	Solo
2010	First 3D Painting in Brazil	Patriarch Plaza, São Paulo, Brazil	Solo
2011	Mural UNE Biennial	São Paulo, Brazil	Group
2011	Wall, London, Roundhouse	London, UK	Solo
2011	Wall	Lyon, France	Solo
2011	History of the Complexo do Alemão	Complexo do Alemão, Rio de Janeiro, Brazil	Group
2011	Paradise	Art Gallery André, São Paulo, Brazil	Solo
2011	Greenpincel	Vila Madelana, São Paulo, Brazil	Solo
2011	Sarasota Chalk Festival	Miami, US	Group
2011	Art Basel	Miami, US	Group
2012	PART Fair of Contemporary Art	Paço das Artes, São Paulo, Brazil	Group
2013	Paulista	Walla Avenue Paulista near metro Paradise	Solo
2014	The American Dream	1AM Gallery, San Francisco, CA, US	Solo
2015	Wall	Fifth Street and Hennepin Avenue, Minneapolis, Minnesota, US	Solo
