= Eric Borgstein =

Dutch pediatric surgeon

Eric S. Borgstein is a Dutch pediatric surgeon and professor of surgery at the University of Malawi College of Medicine.

== Early life ==
Borgstein was born in Malawi to two Dutch physicians. He attended medical school and trained as a surgeon in Scotland and underwent specialized pediatric surgery training in the Netherlands. He is a Fellow of the Royal College of Surgeons of Edinburgh.

== Career ==
He started work as a surgeon at the Queen Elizabeth Central Hospital in Blantyre, in 1992. He has strong interest in surgical training and has played a leading role in the establishment of the Master of Medicine program in pediatric surgery at the Malawi University College of Medicine. He has also been a leader in the establishment of a pediatric surgery track at the College of Surgeons of East, Central and Southern Africa (COSECSA).

He is a member of the British Association of Paediatric Surgeons. Borgstein is the current Secretary General of COSECSA, and previously served as the chairman of the college's Examinations Committee. In July 2017, when Mercy James Institute for Pediatric Surgery and Intensive Care was established, Borgstein was appointed its medical director. The hospital is a joint venture between the government of Malawi and Raising Malawi, a non-profit organization.
