= Consol Homes Orphan Care =

Malawi community organisation

Consol Homes is a Malawi community organisation that supports orphans and young children affected by HIV and AIDs.

== About Consol Homes ==
The organization was established in 2000 by community members from Kalolo, Malawi to support orphans and other vulnerable children in Malawi. The organization's Executive Guardian is founding member Alfred Chapomba.

The group initially worked to assist single parents, guardians and orphans to develop parenting skills. Consol Homes currently operates in Traditional Authority (T.A.) Kalolo and T.A. Makwangwala providing psychosocial training and support for guardians and orphans affected by HIV/AIDS. The group also provides recreational and educational support, Community Home Based Care (CHBC) for the chronically sick, pre-school development programs, income generation schemes and vocational training. It also runs feeding programs for children at risk from malnourishment.

The organization is volunteer based and currently provides care, support and guidance to over 20,000 children, through 101 centres. In addition Consol Homes support over 500 students annually through their secondary and tertiary education.

== Awards ==
Consol Homes was selected as a winner of the Red Ribbon Award 2008. Selected from more than 550 nominations from 147 countries the award recognised Consol Homes' "Community Leadership and Action on AIDS".

Consol Homes has been identified as a model for UNICEF's programmes for psychosocial care for children at risk due to HIV/AIDS in Malawi, and as the "National Model for Orphan Outreach" by the Malawian government. The organisation also played a major role in the organization of the first "International Grandmothers Gathering" held in conjunction with the 2006 International AIDS Conference, Canada, and led by the Stephen Lewis Foundation.

In 2006 Consol Homes was selected to partner the Raising Malawi Orphan Care Initiative as part of its nationwide programme to provide social, educational and economic support for orphans and other vulnerable children.

== Partner organisations ==
- Government of Malawi – Ministry of Women and Child Development
- Regional Psychosocial Support Initiative (REPSSI)
- UNICEF
- Raising Malawi

Consol Homes is also an active member of the following networks :

- Malawi Network of AIDS Service Organizations (MANASO)
- Lilongwe and Ntchewu District AIDS Committee (DACCs)
- Network of Organizations Working with Vulnerable and Orphaned Children (NOVOC)
- Government of Malawi's National OVC (Orphans and Other Vulnerable Children) Technical Working Group.
