= Parque das Ruínas =

Glória Maria Park
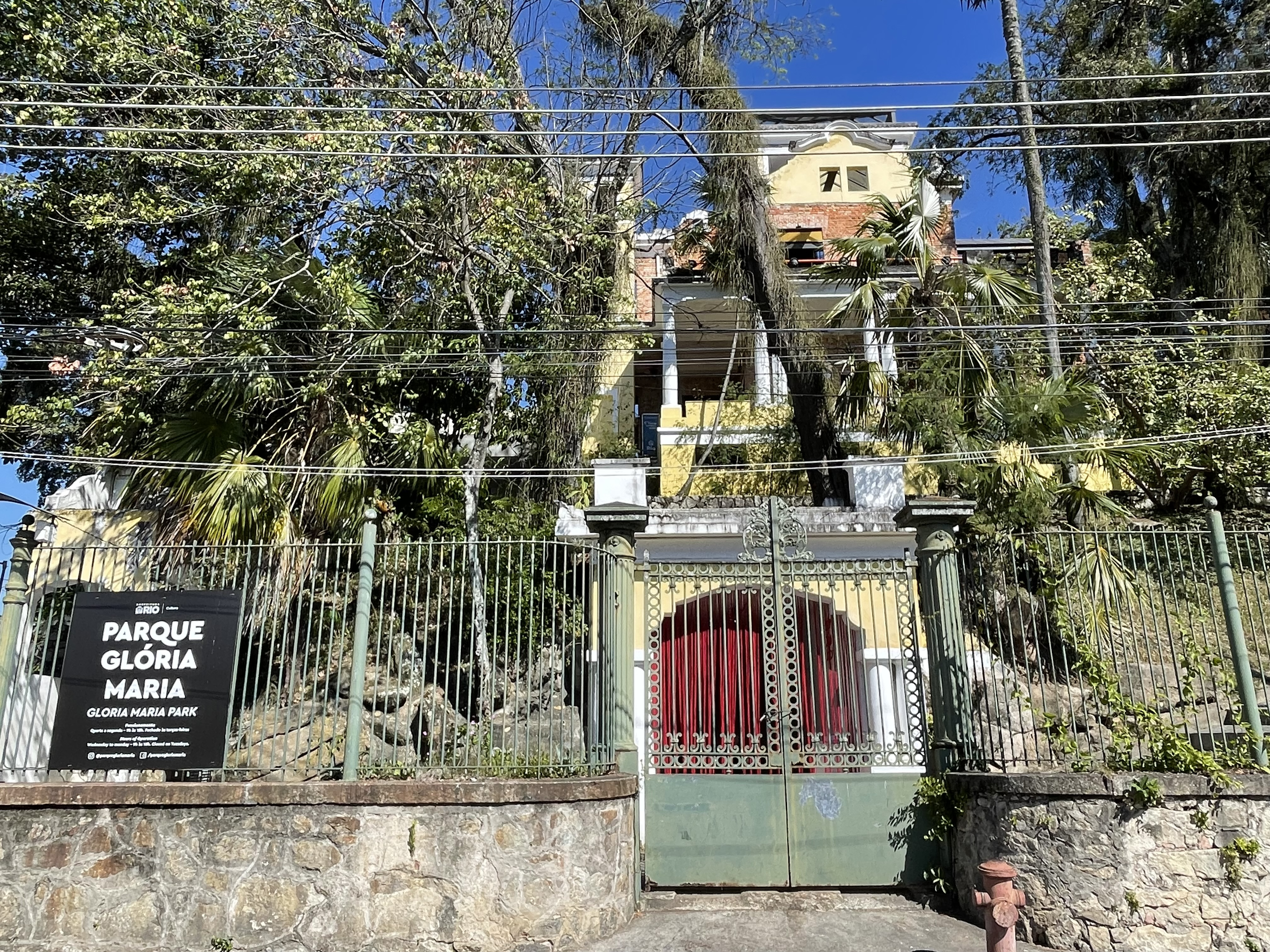
- Parque Glória Maria (Parque das Ruínas)
- Interactive map of Glória Maria Park
- 22.9177°S 43.1825°W
- Location: Rua Murtinho Nobre 169, Santa Teresa, Rio de Janeiro, Brazil

The Centro Cultural Municipal Parque das Ruínas, often called simply Parque das Ruínas (Ruins Park), is a public park with an art gallery built around the ruins of a mansion, located in the Santa Teresa neighborhood in Rio de Janeiro, Brazil. It is a venue for live outdoor concerts and houses a bar. The park was officially renamed Centro Cultural Parque Glória Maria in 2023, and features a mural of the Brazilian journalist and television host Glória Maria by Eduardo Kobra.

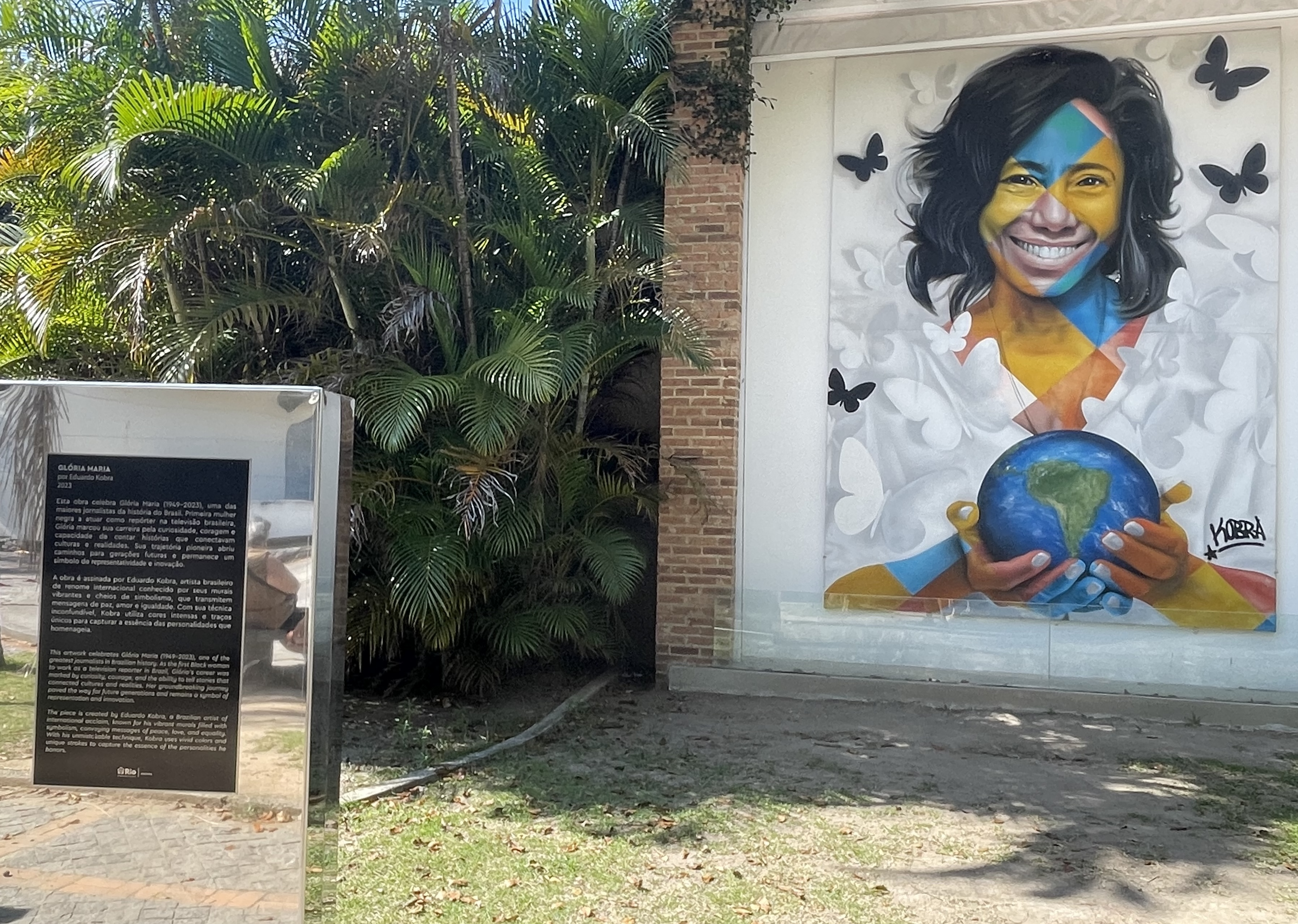
Glória Maria mural by Eduardo Kobra

The site was the residence of Belle Époque socialite and arts patron Laurinda Santos Lobo who, in the early 20th century, invited intellectuals and artists to her mansion for concerts and social events. In 1993, after 40 years of abandonment, Rio de Janeiro's state government purchased the site and organized an architectural contest. In 1997 the former hotel was transformed into a cultural center, designed after the winning project of architect Ernani Freire and Sonia Lopes, who kept the structure of the ruins and added a contemporary look. Today the site offers a variety of cultural events.

The Parque das Ruínas offers a unique panoramic view of Rio de Janeiro, with a broad view of Guanabara Bay from one side and the Centro from the other side. It is located adjacent to the Museu da Chácara do Céu, the former residence of businessman, collector, and patron Raymundo Ottoni de Castro Maya.
