= BuildOn =

International nonprofit organization

buildOn
- Formation: 1991
- Legal status: Non-profit organization
- Headquarters: Stamford, Connecticut
- Website: buildon.org

buildOn is an international nonprofit organization that runs youth service afterschool programs in United States high schools and builds schools in developing countries. The organization's programs engage young Americans from mostly urban areas in community service and promote literacy among children and adults in developing countries.

buildOn views its service learning and school construction programs as a form of social activism that intends to, in their words, "break the cycle of poverty, illiteracy and low expectations". buildOn is based in Stamford, Connecticut. They have a four-star rating from Charity Navigator.

== History ==
President and CEO Jim Ziolkowski was inspired to found the nonprofit after watching a two-day celebration for the opening of a school in a village in Nepal, where he was backpacking. In 1991, Ziolkowski quit his finance position at General Electric and founded buildOn, then called Building with Books, with his brother. General Electric was one of the primary funders for the venture.

buildOn's service learning programs were later developed to engage at-risk youth from low performing urban high schools in community service. The first of these programs was organized at Lumen Christi Catholic High School in Jackson, Michigan.

The organization changed its name to buildOn in 2009.

== US service learning programs ==
buildOn runs service learning programs in six urban areas in the United States: Detroit, New York City, Chicago, Boston, southwest Connecticut, and the San Francisco Bay Area. Students from these programs volunteer in their own communities, working on small to large- scale regional service projects such as serving meals at soup kitchens and homeless shelters, spending time with home-bound senior citizens, and tutoring and mentoring younger children.

Some students in buildOn's service programs are also given the opportunity to participate in the building of an international school, an experience the organization refers to as a "Trek for Knowledge". Each year, youth volunteers travel to Burkina Faso, Mali, Malawi, Nepal, Nicaragua, or Senegal for two weeks. Students go through various workshops to prepare themselves for the trek. While building the international school they stay with indigenous families and learn local customs.

=== Impact ===
buildOn claims that their service learning projects have had direct and positive effects on communities with crime and poverty issues. In 2010, a group from one of buildOn's afterschool programs in Detroit planted a community garden on an abandoned lot surrounded by gangs and prostitution. Ziolkowski said that the presence of the youth working on the garden promoted change, pushing crime out of the neighborhood.

The organization has also on several occasions offered statistics suggesting the correlation between community service and academic performance. According to buildOn, 93% percent of buildOn students go to college and the program's participants are twice as likely to graduate than those who do not volunteer.

In 2010, Brandeis University conducted a study of one of buildOn's afterschool programs in the Bronx. buildOn subsequently published these findings, which support a causal link between the personal skills buildOn's service learning programs focus on and improved academic achievement.

== International school building ==
According to buildon.org, more than 110,000 children and adults attend their 864 international schools. These schools are reportedly built using local materials such as concrete bricks, and a team of volunteering parents often assists the construction.

Before every school is built, a buildOn representative organizes the signing of a contractual document for the construction site's community known as a "covenant". With it, the community pledges to provide available labor to the construction and equal education for women and girls after the school's completion.

== Fundraising and partners ==
buildOn has received donations from various sponsors, including jewelry company Stella and Dot and clothing line OmniPeace.

In February 2011, buildOn was one of the nonprofits participating in Groupon's Save the Money campaign. Groupon's deal matched customers’ donations to build schools in Mali and Nepal.

buildOn was also one of the 14 nonprofits who partnered with Sojo Studios on the release of WeTopia, a Facebook game through which players contribute funds to organizations supporting worldwide causes such as the fight against poverty, hunger, and violence. WeTopia has been called a Farmville for social good, and was also featured on The Ellen DeGeneres Show, leading to a system crash.

In January 2012, Madonna announced that she and her nonprofit Raising Malawi would be making significant contributions to buildOn and partnering with them to construct ten schools in Malawi. Madonna commented that "We now will be able to serve twice as many children as we would have served with our old approach. [...] Constructing smaller schools in partnership with buildOn has restored my faith that we can accomplish what we promised we would."
