= Mercy James Institute for Pediatric Surgery and Intensive Care =

Coordinates: 15°48′07″S 35°01′08″E

Mercy James Centre for Paediatric Surgery and Intensive Care
- Raising Malawi
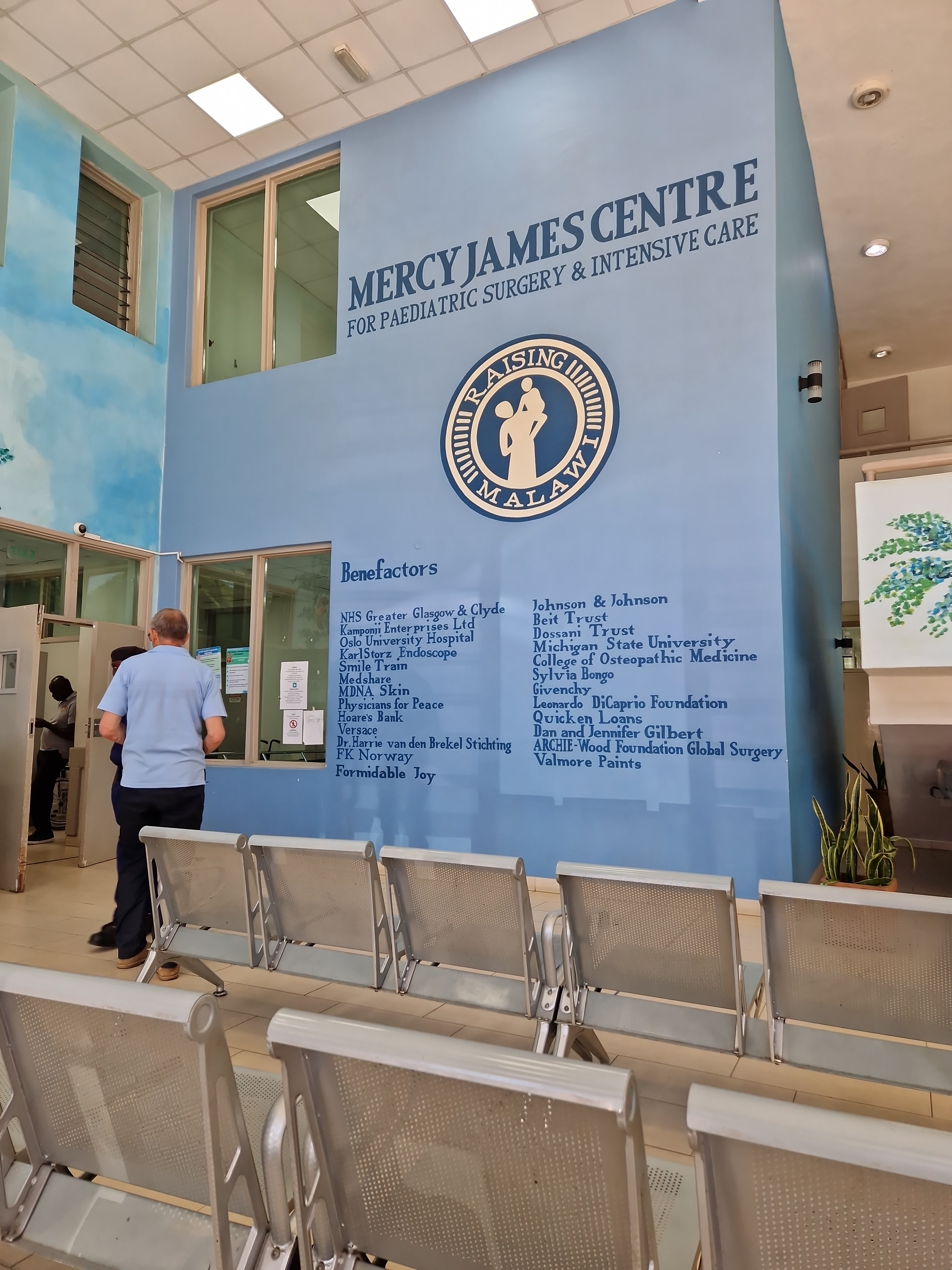
- reception in 2026

Geography
- Location: Blantyre, Malawi, Malawi

Organisation
- Care system: Public, Non-profit
- Type: Paediatric
- Affiliated university: University of Malawi

Services
- Emergency department: I
- Beds: 50+

History
- Founded: 11 July 2017; 8 years ago

Links
- Other links: Hospitals in Malawi

The Mercy James Centre for Paediatric Surgery and Intensive Care (MJC), also Mercy James Centre, or Mercy James Hospital, is the children's wing of the Queen Elizabeth Central Hospital in Blantyre. children's hospital in Malawi.

== Location ==
The institute is located in the central business district of Blantyre, Malawi's second-largest city. MJC is located on the grounds of the Queen Elizabeth Central Hospital, the largest public hospital in Blantyre, to which it is affiliated. It is within walking distance of the Kamuzu University of Health Sciences (formerly the University of Malawi College of Medicine), which uses the 1,000-bed Queen Elizabeth Central Hospital as its teaching hospital.

== Overview ==
This institute was developed by Raising Malawi, a non-government organization, founded by Madonna, in collaboration with the Malawian health ministry, to provide intensive care services for children and increase the number of pediatric surgeries performed at Queen Elizabeth Central Hospital. The Mercy James Centre is a modern, fully equipped pediatric surgery and intensive care unit at Queen Elizabeth Central Hospital in the city of Blantyre, Malawi’s commercial and financial center.

Prior to the opening of MJC, the Queen Elizabeth Central Hospital had less than ten intensive care beds. The entire country of 17 million people, of whom 15 percent were aged less than 15 years, had fewer than five pediatric surgeons. The new institute addresses both those problems. It serves as a teaching facility for Malawian pediatric surgeons.

== History ==
Plans to construct this institute were first made public in November 2014. Construction of the buildings started in 2015 and the hospital was officially opened on 11 July 2017.

== See also ==
- Education in Malawi
- Eric Borgstein
- Healthcare in Malawi
