= Queen Elizabeth Central Hospital =

Coordinates: 15.803°N 35.017°W

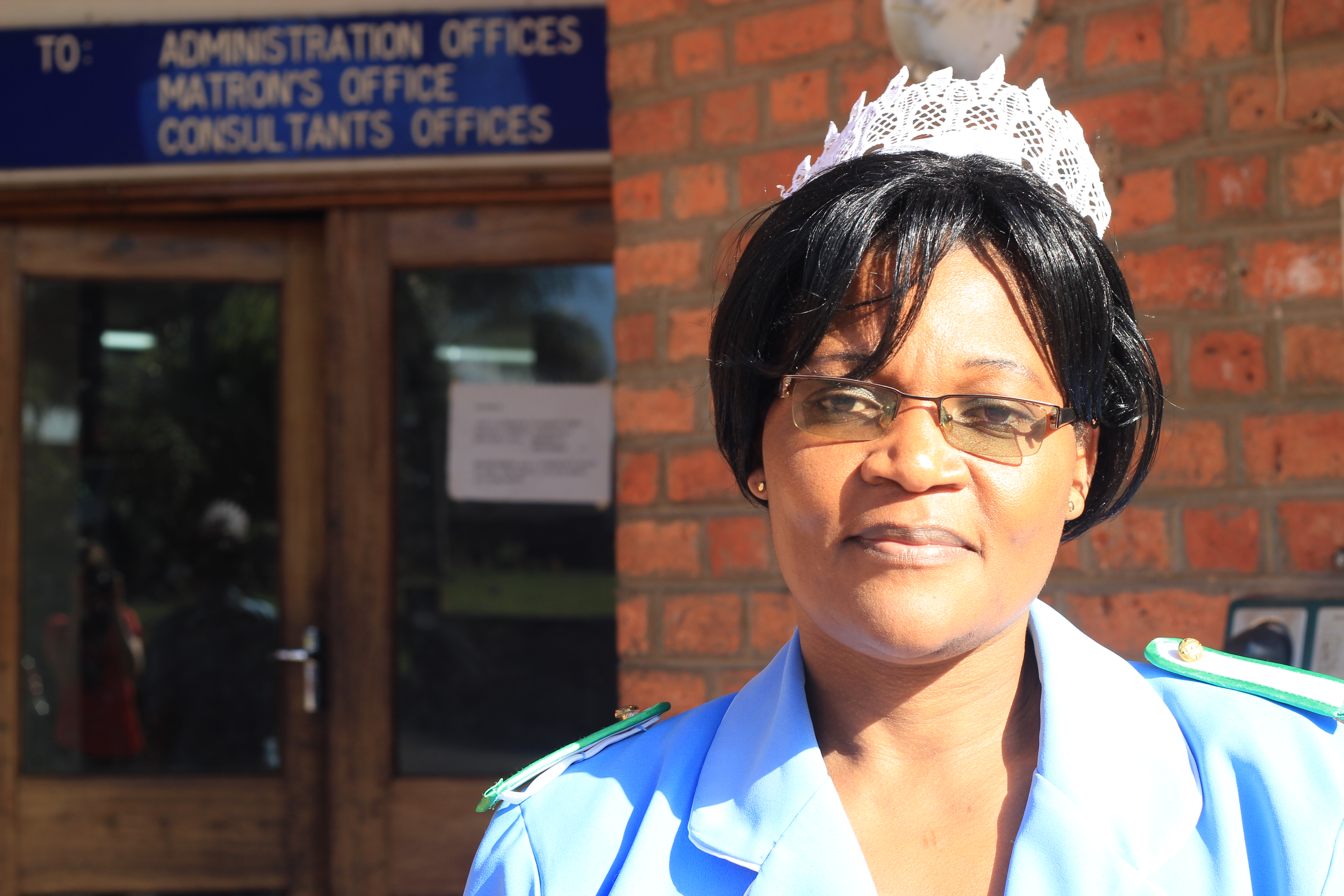
- Christina Mbiza, Nursing Officer at the hospital

Geography
- Location: Blantyre, Southern Region, Malawi

Organisation
- Type: District General, Teaching
- Affiliated university: Kamuzu University of Health Sciences

Services
- Emergency department: Yes
- Beds: 1,350

Links
- Lists: Hospitals in Malawi

The Queen Elizabeth Central Hospital, is a tertiary referral and teaching hospital in Malawi, situated in Blantyre. It provides care to the surrounding district hospitals, health clinics, and private medical facilities. Officially, the hospital has 1,350 beds available.

== History ==
In 1958, the hospital was given its name in honour of Queen Elizabeth II.

When her child was about to be born in 1961 Ceciwa Khonje was taken to Queen Elizabeth Central Hospital. Khonje's white neighbour, who was also about to deliver, was taken to the delivery ward, but Khonje was left in reception, because she was black. Her brother, Dr Harry Bwanausi, joined Khonje's protests as he was a doctor at the hospital. Their protests were successful and she was taken to the "whites only" delivery ward. Her victory created a precedent for those who followed her.

Prior to 2017 the Queen Elizabeth Central Hospital had less than ten intensive care beds. The Mercy James Institute for Pediatric Surgery and Intensive Care opened in June 2017, with an official opening in the following month. It was built as the result of a partnership between the Malawian Ministry of Health and Raising Malawi, a charity created by Madonna. Madonna has adopted four Malawian children, one of whom is Mercy James, the namesake of this unit. The institute serves as a teaching facility for Malawian pediatric surgeons.

In 2024 it was noted that the hospital was delivering with limited resources to an area with high needs. Twenty or thirty surgical operations were made every day. American medical staff from the University of Massachusetts Chan Medical School have an exchange with QECH staff so that they can experience this type of medical delivery.

== Staff ==
Madalitso Baloyi, who became the Minister of Health and Sanitation in 2025, began her career at this hospital.
