= Service learning programs =

There are differing definitions of service-learning. Weigert states that in service-learning "three of the elements focus more on the community side of the equation; the other three focus more on the campus side. On the community side: the student provides some meaningful service, that meets a need or goal, that is defined by a community (or some of its members). On the campus side: the service provided by the student flows from and into course objectives, is integrated into the course by means of assignments that require some form of reflection on the service in light of course objectives, and the assignment is assessed and evaluated accordingly."

Many universities, community colleges, and K-12 schools offer programs that focus on service-learning. Some schools have a well-embedded program that offers credit, while others may utilize it as a classification on a transcript or as a certificate. Below is a list of examples (not all inclusive) of different service-learning programs offered throughout the United States. The universities listed (in alphabetical order) have exemplified service-learning as an academic philosophy on their campus.

== University programs ==
=== Boise State University ===
Boise State University's service-learning center supports faculty, students, and community organizations to connect classroom learning with hands-on community engagement. BSU believes service-learning "enhances student learning, addresses critical community issues, and builds students’ capacities to be change makers in their local, national and global communities." Boise State University also offers a Service-Learning Exhibit in Fall and Spring that allows students to showcase their service-learning project through a professional poster or video.

=== Duke University ===
Duke University's service-learning program focuses specifically on assistance to faculty members interested in integrating service-learning into their courses. This includes consultation, training, research opportunities, funding, resources, and advocacy for the work of university faculty, staff, and students as they work with communities.

=== Elon University ===
The Kernodle Center for Civic Life at Elon University focuses on inspiring and preparing students to work with diverse communities while addressing local and global concerns and issues. Their goal is to help students become active and civic members in their community. The Center emphasizes student learning opportunities that specifically address the common good."

=== Georgetown University ===
Georgetown University's Center for Social Justice (CSJ) designates community-based learning courses. Community-based activities have been called “service-learning.” Students must complete a specific amount of 20 to 40 hours of community-based work which includes course assignments." Some universities do not require specific hours.

=== Michigan State University ===
The Center of Service-Learning and Civic Engagement at Michigan State "provide active, service-focused, community-based, mutually beneficial, integrated, learning opportunities for students, building and enhancing their commitment to academics, personal and professional development, and civic responsibility." MSU provides a toolkit for faculty and instructors interested in incorporating service-learning into their classrooms.

=== Portland State University ===
The Student Community Engagement Center (SCEC) at Portland State believe that community members can create social change. They encourage engagement activities/opportunities in order to support this cause. Portland State University also offers one of the few graduate certificates in the United States that focuses on service-learning.

=== Purdue University ===
At Purdue University, service-learning focused on the education and academic aspect of service-learning: a) participate in an organized service activity that meets community-identified needs; b) use knowledge and skills directly related to a course, discipline and/or specific learning outcomes; and c) reflect on the service activity in such a way as to gain further understanding of course content and/or learning outcomes and an enhanced sense of personal values and civic responsibility." Purdue University provides students the opportunity to showcase their service-learning and community based projects in an undergraduate journal titled Puarning and International Engagementrdue Journal of Service-Learning. Purdue University also has a service-learning program specifically in the engineering department called EPICS (de-abbreviate).

=== Tulane University ===
Tulane University writes believes in “learning by doing” which enables students to apply academic knowledge and critical thinking skills to meet genuine community needs. Through deep reflection and assessment, students gain deeper understanding of course content and the importance of civic engagement. The university focuses on a research agenda that encompasses students, faculty, and community partners.

=== University of North Carolina – Chapel Hill ===
APPLES Service-Learning is a student-led program at the University of North Carolina at Chapel Hill that transforms educational experiences by connecting academic learning and public service. Since 1990, APPLES has strengthened civic engagement by bringing together students, faculty and communities in sustained and mutually beneficial partnerships".

=== University of Notre Dame ===
The McGrath Institute for Church Life at the University of Notre Dame provides opportunities to be in several different service learning activities that include Catholic theology, ministry, spirituality, and formation. The university offers a unique experience called the Echo Graduate Service Program where you can earn a Masters of Arts in theology.

=== Vanderbilt University ===
At Vanderbilt University, community engagement pedagogies, often called “service learning,” are ones that combine learning goals and community service in ways that can enhance both student growth and the common good. Vanderbilt University creates collaborative projects between faculty and community partners where students apply course content to community-based activities.
