= Raising Malawi =

Charity providing aid for orphans in Malawi

- Industry: Non-profit
- Founded: 2006
- Founder: Madonna; Michael Berg
- Headquarters: United States
- Area served: Worldwide
- Revenue: 306,570 United States dollar (2022)
- Total assets: 639,780 United States dollar (2022)

Raising Malawi is a charity non-profit organization that was founded by Madonna and Michael Berg in 2006. It is dedicated to helping with the extreme poverty and hardship endured by Malawi's one million orphans, primarily through health and education programming. Initially, the "Raising Malawi Academy for Girls" was to be constructed but following an audit by the Global Philanthropy Group, which questioned expenditure on salaries and benefits as well as the management capacity and culture, the charity's school headmistress resigned in October 2010 and the project was scrapped.

In January 2012, the organisation announced a partnership to build 10 primary schools to serve over 1,000 children in rural Malawi. Children received primary education support, including academic scholarships, school uniforms, and learning materials. They will benefit from the construction of new or renovated primary and secondary schools. In December 2014 it was announced that the organization completed ten schools to educate 4,871 children in different locations in Malawi. The enterprise was in association with buildOn and will benefit children of all sexes and the project was completed within twelve months, six months ahead of schedule.

In April 2013, President of Malawi Joyce Banda expressed criticism of Madonna and her charity, accusing her of exaggerating her charity's contribution and "bullying state officials." Madonna responded by releasing a statement saying she was saddened that Banda "has chosen to release lies about what we've accomplished, my intentions, how I personally conducted myself while visiting Malawi and other untruths. I have no intention of being distracted by these ridiculous allegations." Later, it was confirmed that Banda had not approved the statement released written by her press team and was "incandescent with anger" over the mix-up. Madonna has since further strengthened her relationship with the Malawian government. In November 2014, Madonna and the Raising Malawi team visited the country and met with newly elected President Peter Mutharika as well as several Government Ministers. During the visit, President Mutharika named Madonna the Goodwill Ambassador for Child Welfare. Madonna said in a statement, "I feel a deep commitment and love for the children of Malawi and am grateful for the support of the Government. I look forward to my new role as Goodwill Ambassador for Child Welfare."

== Mission statement ==
Since 2006, Raising Malawi has been dedicated to bringing an end to the extreme poverty and hardship endured by Malawi's one million orphans. Co-founded by Madonna and Michael Berg, Raising Malawi uses a community-based approach to provide immediate direct physical assistance, create long-term sustainability, support education and psycho-social programs, and build public awareness through multimedia and worldwide volunteer efforts.
As a part of its activities, Raising Malawi works to distribute financial support that will help community-based organizations provide vulnerable children with nutritious food, proper clothing, secure shelter, formal education, targeted medical care, and emotional support. We believe in empowering the smartest and most caring of those people, the ones who understand the challenges and the solutions.

== Charity fundraiser ==
On February 6, 2008, Madonna and Gucci hosted a fundraiser on the North Lawn of the United Nations in New York to benefit Raising Malawi & UNICEF. In attendance was Tom Cruise, Rihanna, Jennifer Lopez, Gwen Stefani, Demi Moore and Gwyneth Paltrow. On October 29, 2009, Madonna announced on the Raising Malawi website and her website that she would match donations made to Raising Malawi projects.

== Programs ==
=== Education ===
One of Raising Malawi's major focus areas is funding education projects. Raising Malawi supports the basic education needs of Malawi orphans, including academic scholarships, school uniforms, and learning materials. Raising Malawi sponsors 600 children at a Malawian orphanage with educational funding, vocational scholarships and an HIV awareness soccer program.

Madonna had co-sponsored investments into building a school, Raising Malawi Academy for Girls. The project however was scrapped due to financial & tax irregularities. In January 2012, Raising Malawi announced a partnership with buildOn to build 10 primary schools to serve over 1,000 children in Malawi. Children will receive primary education support, including academic scholarships, school uniforms, and learning materials. They will benefit from the construction of new or renovated primary and secondary schools.

In December 2012 it was announced that Madonna's Raising Malawi organization completed ten schools to educate 4,871 children in different locations in Malawi. The enterprise is in association with buildOn and follows the original announcement of building an Academy for Girls which was scrapped. Instead the schools will benefit children of all sexes and the project was completed within twelve months, six months ahead of schedule.

As of 2020 Raising Malawi and buildOn have built 14 primary schools in rural Malawi and educated community members about the importance of girls’ education. Students who attend these schools no longer have to walk miles to reach a school in a neighboring village, learn math under a tree or study their ABCs under a thatched roof. Today, the Raising Malawi schools serve nearly 10,000 students, fulfilling Madonna's commitment to making learning and school accessible to Malawian youth.

=== Health ===
About fifty percent of Malawi's population is under 15 years of age, making pediatric care a top priority for the country. Raising Malawi has addressed this need since 2008 by supporting the pediatric surgery program at Queen Elizabeth Central Hospital in Blantyre, the country's commercial capital. Queen Elizabeth is the largest hospital in Malawi and serves a population of 700,000 people annually. It is a public hospital whose services are free.

At Queen Elizabeth, Raising Malawi partners with one of only three pediatric surgeons in Malawi, who performs hundreds of life-saving surgeries annually and teaches local medical students and clinicians. Raising Malawi expanded its pediatric surgery work in 2014 at Queen Elizabeth by launching a project with the Malawi Ministry of Health to construct a pediatric surgery and intensive care unit (ICU) at the hospital. The facility will include the country's first pediatric ICU, will double the number of life-saving surgeries, and will improve longer health outcomes for children who are currently dying as they wait for ICU beds. Raising Malawi also collaborates with the Elizabeth Taylor Aids Foundation to bring Grassroot Soccer (GRS), a HIV/AIDS prevention and testing program, into the communities where Raising Malawi is active. GRS is also active in the Mulanje region, one of the highest HIV infection areas in the country.

=== Girls' School ===
Following an audit by the Global Philanthropy Group, which questioned expenditure on salaries and benefits as well as the management capacity and culture, the charity's school headmistress was fired in October 2010. In January 2011 it was announced that plans to build a school, the charity's flagship project, were abandoned. In March 2011 the board of directors was removed. The collapse of the school project resulted in labour disputes and complicated a dispute with villagers who lost land to the project. It also resulted in a legal suit by former employees at the school for wrongful termination.

== Government relations ==
When Madonna visited Malawi in April 2013, President of Malawi Joyce Banda was creditted with expressed criticism of Madonna and her charity, accusing her of exaggerating her charity's contribution and "bullying state officials". The president's office accused her of being "a musician who desperately thinks she must generate recognition by bullying state officials instead of playing decent music on the stage" and added "For her to tell the whole world that she is building schools in Malawi when she has actually only contributed to the construction of classrooms is not compatible with manners of someone who thinks she deserves to be revered with state grandeur." Madonna responded by releasing a statement saying she was saddened that Banda "has chosen to release lies about what we've accomplished, my intentions, how I personally conducted myself while visiting Malawi and other untruths. I have no intention of being distracted by these ridiculous allegations." Later, it was confirmed that Banda had not approved the statement released written by her press team and was "incandescent with anger" over the mix-up.

Madonna and Raising Malawi have since strengthened their relationship with the Malawian government. In November 2014, Madonna and the Raising Malawi team visited the country and met with newly elected President Peter Mutharika as well as several Government Ministers. During the visit, President Mutharika named Madonna the Goodwill Ambassador for Child Welfare.

== Documentary film ==
In May 2008, Madonna hosted the premiere of a documentary film that she wrote and produced, titled I Am Because We Are, at the Tribeca Film Festival. Directed by Nathan Rissman, the film follows the stories of several Malawian children who have been orphaned by HIV/AIDS and poverty. The documentary was also screened at the Cannes Film Festival in connection with the 2008 amfAR Cinema Against AIDS gala, and at the Traverse City Film Festival in Michigan. On March 25, 2009, the documentary officially debuted on YouTube and Hulu.
