= Elder (surname) =

Origin
- Origin: English
- Region of origin: Britain

Other names
- Variant forms: Elderkin, Elders, Elderson

Elder is a Scottish surname with variant spellings. Its oldest public record was found in 1066 AD in Edinburgh. People with the name Elder or its variants include:

== Surname ==
- Aldamar Elder (1854–1951), American politician and businessman
- Alex Elder (born 1941), Northern Irish footballer
- Alexander Lang Elder (1815–1885), Australian pioneer and founder of Elders Limited in 1840
- Alexander Elder, co-founder of British 19th century publisher Smith, Elder & Co.
- Alfonso Elder (1898–1974), American university president
- Alison Elder, English cricket player
- Alistair Elder, New Zealand football player
- Ann Elder (born 1942), American screenwriter
- Anne Elder (1918–1976), Australian poet
- Brad Elder (born 1975), American golfer
- Brenda Elder, English actress
- Brian Elder, American politician from Michigan
- Bruce Elder (disambiguation)
- Bryce Elder (born 1999), American baseball player
- Callum Elder (born 1995), Australian footballer
- Charles Elder (1821–1851), English painter
- Chris Elder (born 1992), English rugby player
- Christian Elder (1968–2007), American sports car and NASCAR driver
- Christine A. Elder, American diplomat
- Christopher Elder (born 1947), New Zealand diplomat
- Clarence Elder, British art director
- Claybourne Elder (born 1982), American actor
- Conway Elder (1880–1957), American jurist from Missouri
- Corn Elder (born 1994), American football player
- Dave Elder (disambiguation)
- Dawn Elder, American composer, pianist, and music producer
- Don Elder, New Zealand engineer and businessman
- Donnie Elder, American football player
- Dorothy-Grace Elder (born 1942), Scottish journalist and politician
- Eddie Elder (born 1989), American football player
- Edward Elder (1812–1858), British headmaster
- Ern Elder (1916–2007), Australia footballer
- Fred Elder, American race car owner
- George Elder (disambiguation)
- Glen Elder (born 1934), American sociologist
- Heinie Elder (1890–1958), baseball pitcher
- Hinemoa Elder, New Zealand youth forensic psychiatrist
- Isabella Elder (1828-1905), Scottish philanthropist
- Jack Elder (1885–1944), Australian rules football umpire
- Jack Elder (politician) (born 1949), New Zealand politician
- Jack Elder (luger) (born 1941), American luger
- Jake Elder (1936–2010), American NASCAR crew chief
- James Walter Elder (1882–1941), American politician from Louisiana
- Janet Elder (1956–2017), author and news editor
- Jennifer Elder (born 1968), American author, illustrator, and editor
- Jim Elder (equestrian) (born 1934), Canadian equestrian
- Jim Elder (born 1950), Australian politician from Queensland
- Jimmy Elder (1928–2022), Scottish footballer
- John Elder (disambiguation)
- Josephine Elder (Olive Gwendoline Potter; 1895–1988), English children's author
- Josh Elder (born 1980), American journalist and comics writer
- Joycelyn Elders (born 1933), American surgeon general
- Judyann Elder (born 1948), American actress, director, and writer
- Larry Elder (born 1952), American broadcaster and talk show host
- Lauren Elder, American artist and designer
- Lauren Elder (born 1990), American sculptor
- Lee Elder (1934–2021), American golfer
- Lew Elder (1905–1971), Canadian cyclist
- Linda Elder, American educational psychologist
- Lonne Elder III (1927–1996), American playwright and screenwriter
- Lorenzo W. Elder (1820–1892), American politician from New Jersey
- Madge Elder (1895-1985), Scottish gardener, feminist and writer
- Mark Elder, (born 1947), English conductor
- Maurice Elder (1916–2011), American football and baseball coach
- Miriam Elder, American journalist
- Murray Elder, Baron Elder (1950–2023), British politician
- Nancy Elder (1915–1981), Scottish chess master
- Nathan Elder (born 1985), English footballer
- Nathaniel Elder (born 1996), Scottish writer
- Nelson Elder (1923–1983), Northern Irish politician
- Norman Elder (1939–2003), Canadian explorer and equestrian
- Norman Elder (botanist) (1896–1974), New Zealand electrical engineer, teacher and botanist
- Peter Percival Elder (1823–1914), American politician from Kansas
- Philip Elder, Anglican Bishop of the Windward Islands (1986–1993)
- R. Bruce Elder (born 1947), Canadian filmmaker and critic
- Ray Elder (1942–2011), American NASCAR driver
- Raymond Elder (ca. 1962–1994), Northern Irish loyalist
- Robert Elder (disambiguation)
- Rupert Elder, English poker player
- Ruth Elder (1902–1977), American pilot and actress
- Samuel Sherer Elder (died 1885), American artillery commander
- Sprouts Elder (1904–1957), American motorcycle speedway rider
- Steve Elder (born 1956), director of the Catholic Education Office Melbourne
- Suzanne Elder, Chicago community activist
- Thereasea Elder, American nurse from North Carolina
- Thomas Elder, 19th century businessman and philanthropist in South Australia
- Toby Elder (1934–2005), Australian footballer
- Troy Elder (born 1977), Australian field hockey player
- Verona Elder, (born 1953), English athlete
- Viviane Elder (1904–1960), French aviator, driver and actress
- Walt Elder (born 1991), American rugby player
- William Elder (disambiguation)
