= Madonna as a gay icon =

Aspect of American singer's reputation

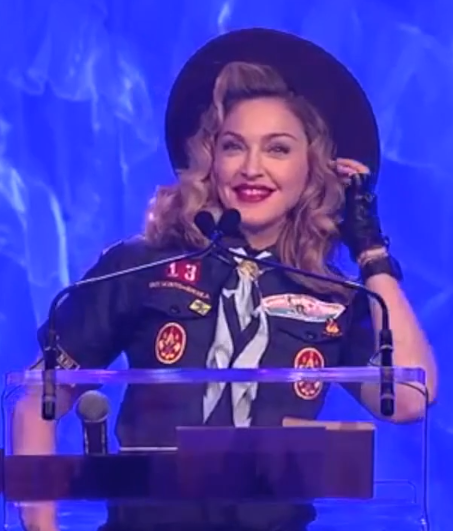
Madonna at the 24th GLAAD Media Awards in New York City in 2013. Dressed as a Cub Scout in protest of the ban on homosexual Scouts and Scout leaders

American singer and actress Madonna is recognized as a gay icon. As a teenager, she was introduced to her dance instructor, Christopher Flynn, an openly gay man who mentored her. Since then, Madonna has always acknowledged the importance of the community for her life and career, declaring that she "wouldn't have a career if it weren't for the gay community".

Madonna has consistently been an advocate for the LGBT community throughout her career, being recognized by GLAAD Media Awards in 1991 (Raising Gay Awareness) and 2019 (Advocate for Change). She has been recognized as a "pioneering ally" by different media outlets, including The New York Times and Associated Press (AP), after a special emphasis in the AIDS crisis when the community or its subcultures were notably stigmatized and she was one of the first mainstream artists to advocate for the cause, according to publications like The Hollywood Reporter and The New Zealand Herald. Using her popularity, she became "the first worldwide celebrity" of that era to do an interview with a national gay magazine, The Advocate, according to themselves. Critic Stephen Holden labeled her interview with them as an "unprecedented frankness for a major star". Sarah Kate Ellis, president of GLAAD stated in 2019: "Madonna always has and always will be the LGBTQ community's greatest ally". In her career, Madonna was also considered by "many" as the "greatest gay icon", a statement seconded or confirmed by outlets such as The Advocate or Parade among others, in addition to be depicted in several LGBT-related media.

Madonna's influence impacted generations of LGBT people, as documented different publications. She has also been credited variously, including her help for bringing gay culture into the mainstream, most notably the dance expression of voguing. However, Madonna also represented challenged views, both inside and outside the community, and has been accused of "appropriation", receiving significantly internal criticism for her portrayal of stereotypes among other reasons. Madonna also faced more backlash in political and religious sectors, being accused to promote homosexuality. In 2012, she was sued in Russia for her support amid the country's anti-LGBT law.

== Relationships and introduction ==
Madonna was introduced to the gay community while still a teenager. It was her ballet teacher, Christopher Flynn, a gay man, who first told Madonna that she had something to offer the world. He also introduced her to the local gay community of Detroit, Michigan, often taking her to local gay bars and discotheques. Observing Flynn she was "conscious of understanding that there was such a thing as gay ... It wasn't called that then. I just came to understand that he was attracted to men". Biographer Carol Gnojewski, wrote "some Madonna devotees tout Christopher Flynn as 'arguably the first Madonna-positive person'".

After moving to New York City in the 1970s to pursue a career in modern dance, Madonna would be surrounded by gay men, including art-world figures such as the plastic artist Keith Haring. Her immersion into the New York gay community became so complete that she began to wish that she were gay: "I didn't feel like straight men understood me. They just wanted to have sex with me. Gay men understood me, and I felt comfortable around them".

Christopher Glazek explains: "Madonna has been intimately connected to a wide community of gay men for decades, as an artistic collaborator, as a political ally, as an employer, as a friend, and as a sister". Some examples include her first book Sex when collaborated with a gay photographer, and included gay models. At some stage of her career, she repeated in interviews that her best friends are gay.

By the end of the 1980s and early 1990s, media "romantically linked" her name with various women, including Sandra Bernhard, Ingrid Casares, and model Jenny Shimizu. While Madonna has never confirmed or denied these relationships, in 2022 she retrospectively said that she has slept with "a good handful" of women throughout her life. In 1991, Madonna told to The Advocate that she believed "everybody has a bisexual nature". Three years later, in an interview with MTV, she admitted that she has had sexual attraction to other women whilst maintaining that she does not think about labels.

=== Influences ===
Madonna credited various influences for both her life and career. A portrait of Lee Miller kissing another woman by Man Ray that she owns, inspired her and encouraged the use of lesbian imagery of her career, according to art critic John Walker. Madonna cited David Bowie as a foundational influence, declaring after attending her first-ever concert at age 15, to be "so inspired by the way he played with gender confusion. Was both masculine and feminine". In 2016, after Bowie's death, she dedicated a redention of his "Rebel Rebel" song during her Rebel Heart Tour, stating: "He showed me that it was OK to be different. And he’s the first Rebel Heart that I laid eyes on [...] Talented. Unique. Genius. Game Changer. The Man who Fell to Earth". After David Collins' death, Madonna penned a letter describing his influence on her life.

== Advocacy and life as an LGBT icon ==
Madonna has a long-lasting history advocating for the community, and "actively participating in gay culture" according to LGBT-targeted magazine Attitude. In this aspect, French academic Georges-Claude Guilbert, writes in Gay Icons (2018) that "Madonna has done little else in her career, camping like a gay man, quoting like a gay man". Boy George described her as "a gay man trapped in a woman's body". In 2017, the British LGBT Awards stated:

Madonna really needs no introduction ... has always been a vocal supporter of the LGBT+ rights, publicly supporting same-sex marriage, gay adoption, homophobic bullying and many other issues affecting the community.

=== Selected 20th century forays ===
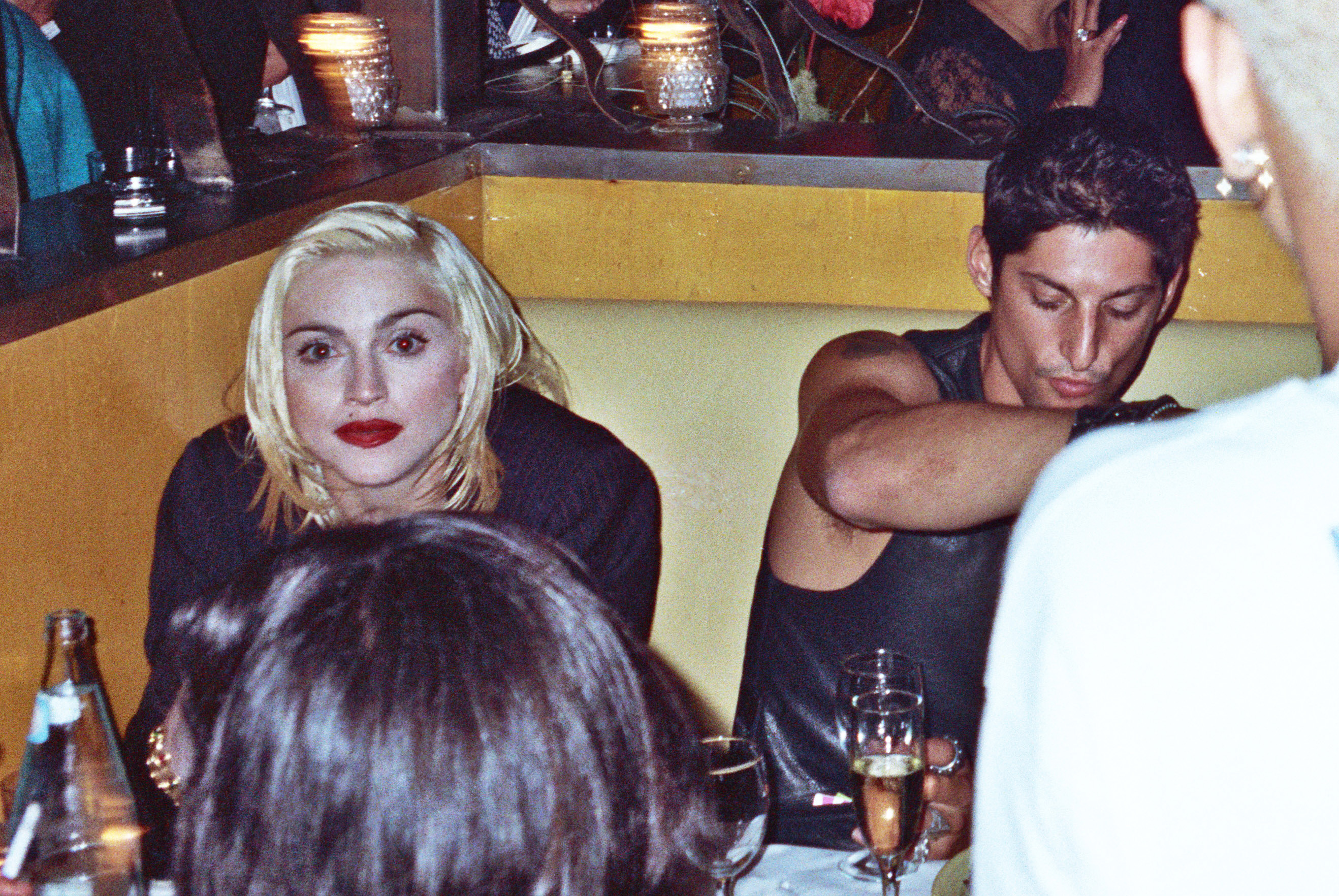
Madonna and Tony Ward during an AIDS Project Los Angeles (APLA) event in 1990

According to publications such as The Hollywood Reporter and The New Zealand Herald, Madonna began as one of the first "notable" names in the entertainment industry to publicly advocate in response to the HIV/AIDS epidemic in the 1980s. Nerdist's Eric Diaz considered her as "the biggest" and "relevant" among young people talking about these problems when government initially ignored the "thousands of mostly gay men dying of AIDS" as per his view. At some point, she reportedly described the AIDS as "the worst thing to happen to the world since Hitler".

Madonna made numerous statements in favor of the community. Most notable, in a two-part interview with The Advocate in 1991, she criticized homophobia in the music industry. The New York Times critic, Stephen Holden deemed that interview, as an "unprecedented frankness for a major star". According to The Advocate themselves, it was the first time a worldwide celebrity did an interview with a national gay magazine. Madonna addressed homophobia again during an interview in Good Morning America, saying: "I deal with a lot of issues ... and what I think to be a big problem in the United States and that is homophobia".

=== Selected 21st century forays ===
In August 2009, during a show in Bucharest, Romania, as part of her Sticky and Sweet Tour, Madonna criticized discrimination against the Roma, also speaking against the discrimination of gays. In June 2010, Madonna released a statement criticizing the decision to jail two men in Malawi because they celebrated their union with a ceremony. Madonna's statement included the following excerpt: "As a matter of principle, I believe in equal rights for all people, no matter what their gender, race, color, religion, or sexual orientation. This week, Malawi took a giant step backward. The world is filled with pain and suffering; therefore, we must support our basic human right to love and be loved"-

In November 2010, Madonna made a special appearance on The Ellen DeGeneres Show to speak against the bullying of children and teenagers in general, including the bullying of gay teens and related recent suicides. In her conversation with DeGeneres, Madonna reiterated how she became close to the gay community when she was a teenager, stating that she felt different in high school and found acceptance and sympathy among gay friends, particularly her dance instructor. She also said "In fact, I wouldn't have a career if it weren't for the gay community". In early 2023, Madonna similarly recognized, "How could I ever not support them myself?", saying that queer people and POC, helped her when she wasn't famous.

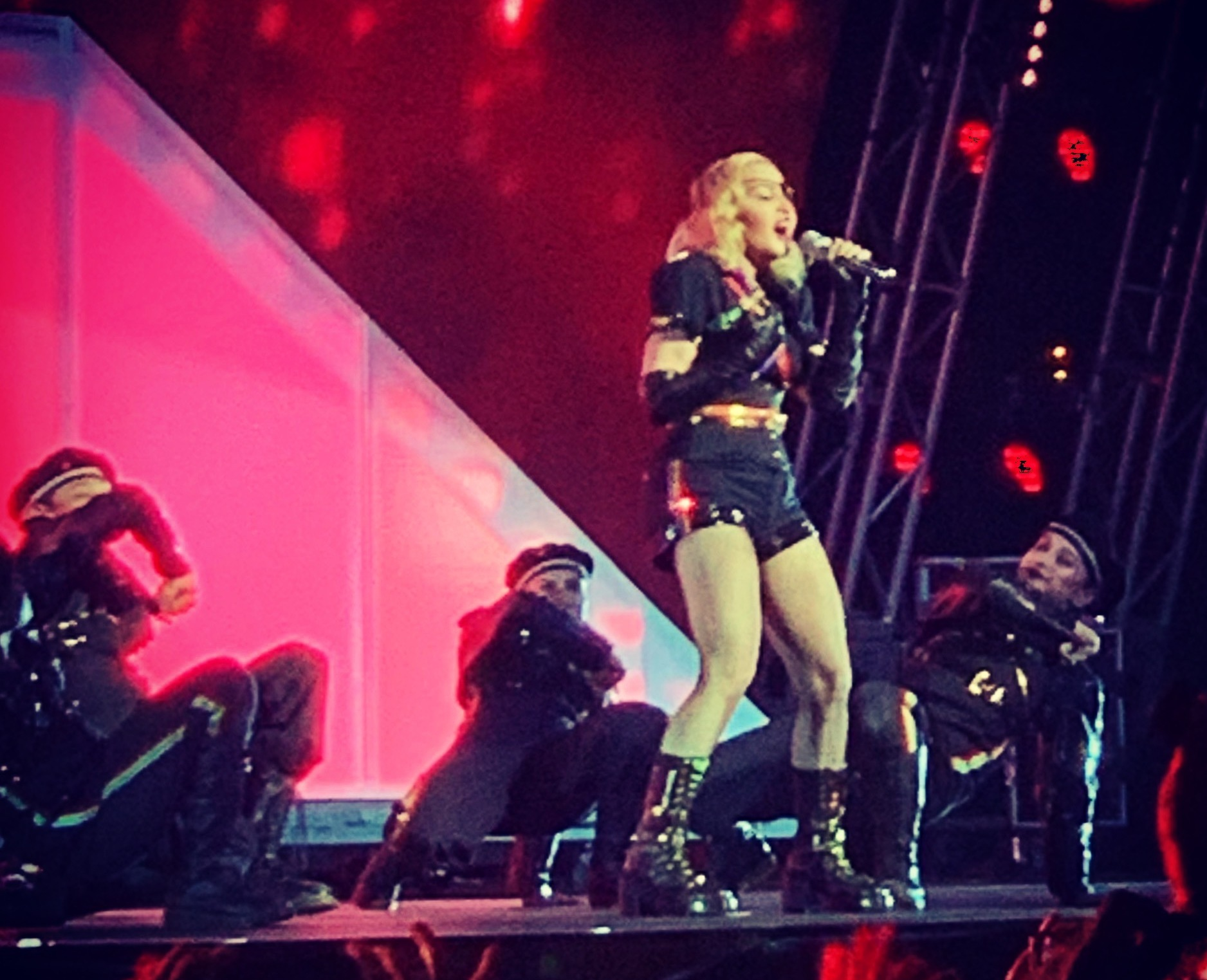
Madonna celebrating Stonewall 50 – WorldPride NYC 2019

In June 2011, Madonna urged her fans to support same-sex marriage in New York, posting the following message on her website: "New Yorkers your voices must be heard. Tell your state Congressmen to support same sex marriage bill. All you need is love". The Marriage Equality Act passed one week later, legalizing same-sex marriage in New York. The following year, 2012, she asked her audience to "Vote No" on the Minnesota marriage amendment for same-sex couples.

In March 2013, Madonna presented the Vito Russo Award to openly gay journalist Anderson Cooper at the 24th GLAAD Media Awards in New York City. Dressed as a Cub Scout, in protest of the Boy Scouts of America's ban on homosexual Scouts and Scout leaders, she gave a speech in which she stated that "things like bigotry, homophobia, hate crimes, bullying and any form of discrimination always seem to be a manifestation of fear of the unknown" and wagered that "if we just took the time to get to know one another, did our own investigation, looked beneath the surface of things, that we would find that we are not so different after all." She also said "you cannot use the name of God or religion to justify acts of violence to hurt, to hate, to discriminate" and called to start a revolution, asking the crowd "Are you with me? It's 2013, people. We live in America — land of the free and home of the brave? That's a question, not a statement." In 2020, she encouraged her fans through an Instagram story to sign a petition on anti-LGBTQ legislation. In a conversation with Reddit users, she answered several questions, including "If you were a gay man, would you be a top or a bottom?" and she said: "I am a gay man".

Madonna has given multiple surprise performances at the Stonewall Inn in Greenwich Village, Manhattan, the birthplace of the modern gay rights movement, including 2018, 2019 and 2022. In her 2018 speech, she said: "I stand here proudly at the place where Pride began. Let us never forget the Stonewall riots". At NYC Pride 2022, Madonna stated metaphorically that New York City was "the best place in the world because of the queer people here. Let me tell you something, if you can make it here, then you must be queer".

== Referential works ==
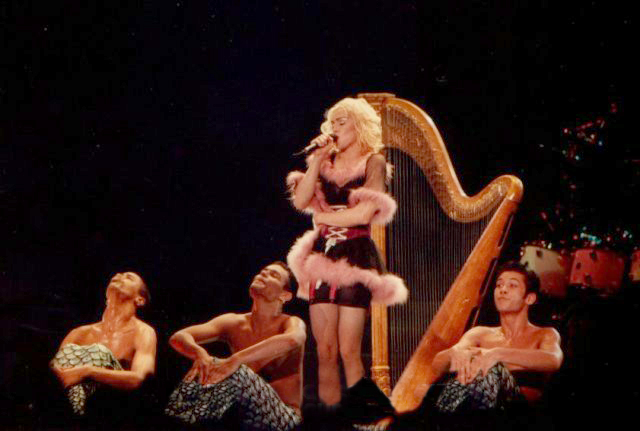
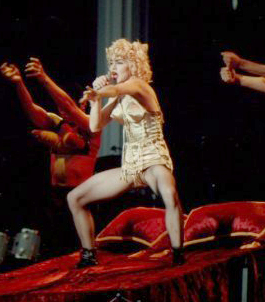
Madonna and her male dancers dressed with elements of woman's clothing in the Blond Ambition World Tour

Gay culture is represented in various of her works, with some of her songs and other projects grounded in queer sensibility, particularly some of her early 1990s works, the documentary Truth or Dare, and music videos for her songs "Justify My Love", "Erotica", and "Vogue". The music video for "God Control" was reminiscent of the 2016 Orlando nightclub shooting.

Erin Harde is cited in Catching a Wave (2016) as saying that Madonna has supported the gay community by using "camp" values to pay respect to the community. In this aspect, Muri Assunção from Billboard explained that she has been "fighting for acceptance and pushing the gay agenda with her art" since the release of her first single "Everybody" in 1982. Madonna featured same-sex couples or herself as part of them in some of her videos and concerts. Michael Musto said she turned many of her concerts into a "gigantic gay bar".

=== Listicles and reception ===
Madonna's music was linked to and made appearances in listicles related to the community over years. In 2005, The Advocate's Steve Gdula commented that "back in the 1980s and even the early 1990s, the release of a new Madonna video or single was akin to a national holiday, at least among her gay fans".

Many have considered "Vogue" a gay anthem, and for Guilbert is "her gayest song" in many ways. In 2022, the staff of Billboard included the song among the "60 Top LGBTQ Anthems of All Time" that defined queer culture. In 2019, Rolling Stone editors, including Suzy Exposito and Rob Sheffield, placed the song among their "25 Essential LGBTQ Pride Songs". Around 2012, LGBTQ magazine Out included various Madonna's albums in their list of "The 100 Greatest, Gayest Albums" of all time, in which it was addressed record's impact for the community. They explained that "Papa Don't Preach" had a "profound meaning for gay men of the Reagan era". In 2022, Queerty editors included The Immaculate Collection in their ranking of albums essential in shaping LGBTQ culture, further describing the compilation as "a must for any gold star gay's record collection".

== Commentaries ==
=== Relationship ===
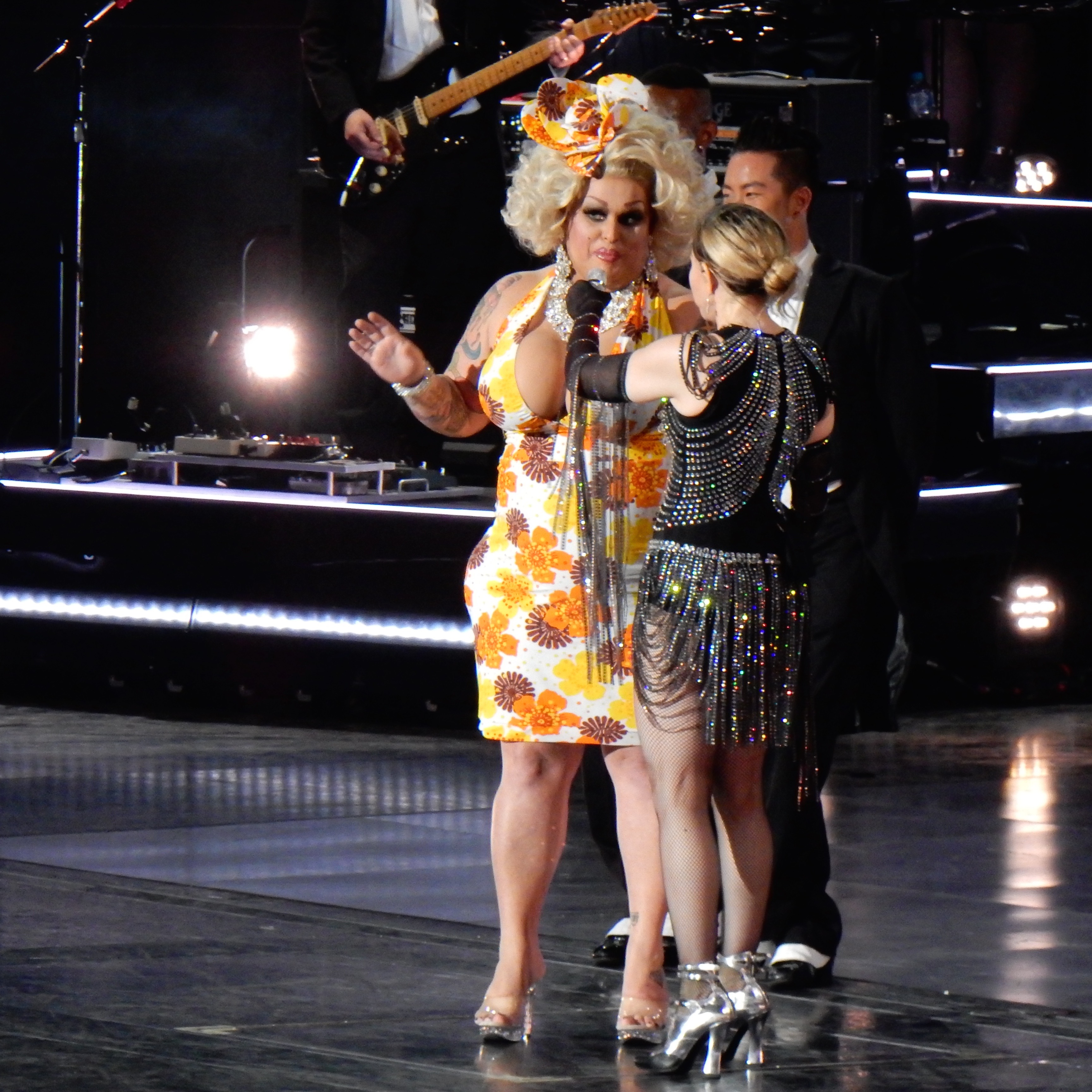
Madonna and a drag queen in her Australian gig of the Rebel Heart Tour in 2016

Her reception and relationship with gay community has attracted commentaries by media and scholars, defined by Samuel R. Murrian from Parade in 2019, as a "unique, historic connection to the LGBTQ community". In Financial Times, Helen Brown wrote in 2022, that her relationship with queer community has remained passionate, but complicated.

A The Advocate editor commenting in the 1990s, said "the gay world ... gets Madonna in a big way". In Madonna as Postmodern Myth (2002), Guilbert defined how she became an "indispensable part of the gay cultural landscape". Judith Peraino, music professor at Cornell University also adds that Madonna's early hypersexuality had particular resonance with gay men. It was also commented that "the gay attraction to Madonna includes her ubiquitous transformations of image, liberated sexuality and elaborate and often campy stage antics". Commenting about her then-massive appeal, Pamela Robertson from University of Notre Dame, wrote in Guilty pleasures (1996), that critics argue that many gay men and lesbians identify with "Madonna's power and independence". In 2001, Sonya Andermahr from University of Northampton asserted that her popularity among lesbians is due to her self-determination and autonomy. In the 1990s, Michael Musto stated: "Her pride, flamboyance, and glamour reach out to gay guys as much as her refusal to be victimized strikes a chord in lesbians". Musto also said that Madonna offers a more equitable model, different from Judy Garland, identified as a gay icon/tragic figure.

Over the course of her career, however, other reviewers have observed a rejection from various both in her prime and latest decades. Alone in the 1990s, sexologist Carol Queen wrote about the rejection by various gay and lesbian communities during the release of her first book Sex. In 2015, Michelle Visage also commented a decline in newer generations. Similarly, in 2023, editor Matthew Rettenmund explored a decline amid newer generations, saying she is "frequently rejected" and even at times some with "trying to erase or demonize her past efforts". Speaking about Internet culture, however, in 2023, Washington Post explored how various gay icons, including Madonna, have been referred to as "mother(s)".

=== Academic ===
Over decades, Madonna has received significant academic attention, including areas like queer studies. She was identified as a symbol of queer studies. A group of her then scholars worked also in queer theory. Scholar Michael R. Real in Exploring Media Culture: A Guide (1996) summed up that studies of Madonna by Patton (1993), Henderson (1993), and Schwichtenberg (1993) read her contribution in the community.

== Impact ==
Her impact and likeness in the LGBT community have been remarked by numerous LGBT publications and mainstream media alike since the 1980s.

=== Recognition of her activism ===
==== AIDS crisis and homophobia affecting the community ====
Madonna was reported to be the first mainstream ("worldwide") artist to do an interview with The Advocate, a leading gay magazine by that time.

She volunteered and gave money to charitable efforts in support of the community and the AIDS crisis. Though other popular artists advocated in response to the HIV/AIDS crisis, some publications discussed her far-reaching scope for gay culture. Christopher Rosa from Glamour felt and stated "she faced several of these battles alone", and in similar remarks, Tiago Manaia from Portuguese magazine Máxima highlighted her "mainstream" status. Among entertainers, The Daily Telegraph compared both Madonna and Elizabeth Taylor. The era is seen by some as a period that affected the community, including its subcultures, as it was called a "gay disease" and with a country reacting as "antigay" by diverse measurement. Christopher Turner from In magazine, further explained that many average citizen, mainly in North America during the late 1980s, believed that "AIDS was a curse that God gave to the gay community". Rosa called it as "perhaps Madonna's greatest social contribution". According to some reports, GLAAD Media Awards recognized Madonna in 1991 with the Raising Gay Awareness. A year later, Mark Brown from Telegraph Herald was critical towards her provocative public image but praised the singer "to increase our AIDS awareness". In 1991, writing for LGBT newspaper San Francisco Bay Times, Don Baird said: "Never has a pop star forced so many of the most basic and necessary elements of gayness right into the face of this increasingly uptight nation with power and finesse. Her message is clear -Get Over It- and she's the most popular woman in the world who's talking up our good everything". In an article published for OutWeek in 1994, Michael Musto declared she "was more influential than any politician out there when it came to equality because her yay-gay gestures were truly changing our landscape in significant ways".

During the AIDS epidemic, celebrities such as Elizabeth Taylor and Madonna were suspected to be HIV-positive. Perhaps the earliest rumors began in 1987, when she visited a St. Vincent's Hospital in New York, and hugged patients without prejudice, causing suspicions to proliferate. In the 1990s, suspicions resurfaced despite her frequent denials. In this decade, an author commented that "certain segments" of society found comfort in identifying her as a carrier of the AIDS virus, establishing her "moral guilt" as the disease was perceived "[...] as a punishment for immoral behavior". Back in 1991, Richard Rouilard from The Advocate referred, "I think this particular rumor is entirely AIDS-phobic and homophobic ... It's a backlash at Madonna for being so actively involved in AIDS and championing gay people, both in her movies and in her interviews". Around that time, Madonna responded to the rumors saying it is "not a gay disease, it's a human disease".

Rettenmund as cites Hartford Courant in 2006, felt that when AIDS and homophobia caused "others to retreat", Madonna's pro-sex persona was a big deal. Her advocacy was remarked for "young people" especially, while Guy Babineau from LGBT-focused publication Xtra Magazine mentioned other predecessors like Cher and Bette Midler but explaining that "neither spoke to the awakening albeit confused sexual freedom of young women and gay men in the era of the AIDS the way Madonna did". Babineau also mentioned others "gay-er" pop stars during that era, and in a similar connotation, Eric Diaz from Nerdist felt that some gay pop stars hid "their sexual orientation from the wrath of a homophobic public". In comparison, Christopher Glazek said Madonna "became gay" by association. "When other artists tried to distance themselves from the very audience that helped their stars to rise, Madonna only turned the light back on her gay fans and made it burn all the brighter", felt and commented Steve Gdula for The Advocate in 2005.

===== Post-AIDS crisis =====
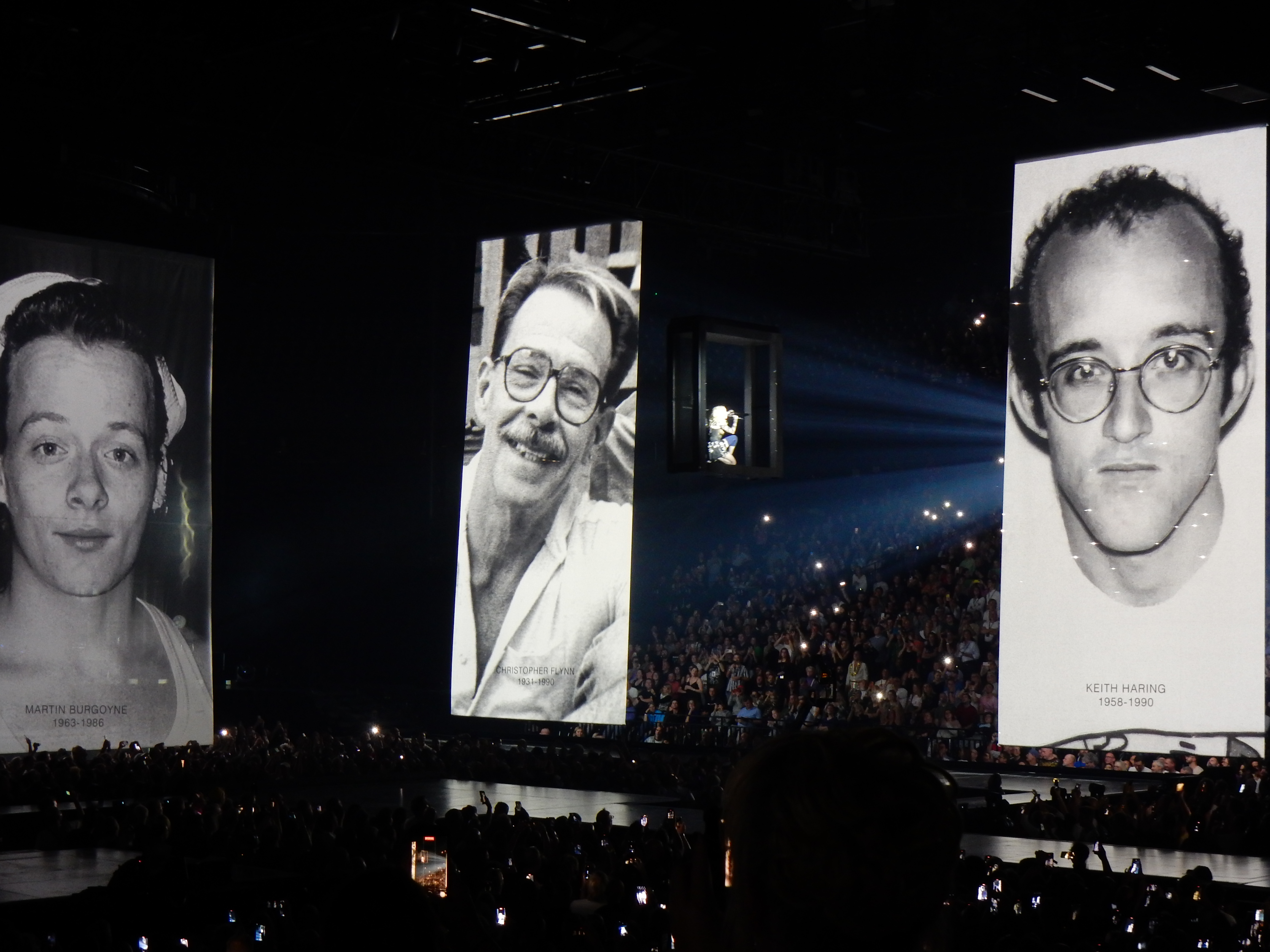
Madonna during the Celebration Tour in 2023, paying tribute to deceased AIDS victims with a performance of "Live to Tell", including plastic artists Keith Haring and Martin Burgoyne, and her mentor Christopher Flynn

Other publications noted a long-standing contributions. In 2019, GLAAD honored her with the Advocate for Change, becoming the second person and first woman to receive the award. By 2015, Glazek held that "it's hard to think of any celebrity who has done more than Madonna to promote public awareness of gay culture", especially for queer community. In Listening to the Sirens (2006), music professor Judith A. Peraino proposes that "no one has worked harder to be a gay icon than Madonna, and she has done so by using every possible taboo sexual in her videos, performances, and interviews". Sarah Kate Ellis, president and CEO of GLAAD, stated in 2019 that Madonna "always has and always will be the LGBTQ community's greatest ally". In 2015, Andy Towle discussed her as "the Most Pro-Gay Pop Ally of All Time". The Associated Press called her a "pioneer for gay rights" in an article published by USA Today in 2019. The staff of The New York Times also called her a "pioneering ally" in 2018, recognizing her advocacy saying:

These days, there's barely a female pop star alive who doesn't loudly broadcast her unwavering, if sometimes exploitative, support for LGBT rights. But in 1991, when Madonna gave her no-holds-barred interview to The Advocate, then the largest voice of gay communities, she showed more understanding of queer issues and identity that any pop star before her, and most who came after. In the two-part sit-down, Madonna revealed the roots of her gay identification via her early mentors.

=== Attributed effects on pop culture ===
==== Background ====
Madonna is the first major mainstream artist to give gay images and themes explicit mass treatment and exposure

— The Good, the Bad and the Gorgeous: Popular Culture's Romance with Lesbianism (1994).

Madonna's figure made possible in her generation provided various with their first impression or representation of the collective, in an era not dominated by Internet, as documented some authors. In Good As You: From Prejudice to Pride – 30 Years of Gay Britain (2017), editor Paul Flynn documented that Madonna's Blond Ambition tour was the first time British gay and girls "got to claim ownership of the thrilling communion and euphoria of a stadium show". The tour was followed by her 1991 documentary Truth or Dare in which "several generations of gay men reported was the first time they had ever seen their own desires represent ... onscreen". Seeing the dance troupe in her 1990 tour, wrote Jeremy Atherton Lin in Gay Bar (2021), "amounted to my first impression of gays". Writing for The Georgia Straight in 2016, Craig Takeuchi explains that many recognized this Madonna's era, as a number were "living in an era prior to the internet and had never seen gay men or gay kissing on screen before". According to LGBT-targeted publication Washington Blade, it became "a gay cultural touchstone".

Virtel said that Madonna accomplished something astounding with "Vogue": She ushered an "audacious", "unapologetically queer art" form into mainstream America, and that means gays everywhere got to witness (and recognize) a rare kind of performative ebullience. For Hopper, she revived an "entire movement" when she performed this song at the 1990 MTV Video Music Awards. Music critic Kelefa Sanneh, said that she "helped define gay nightlife in New York".

==== Discussions ====
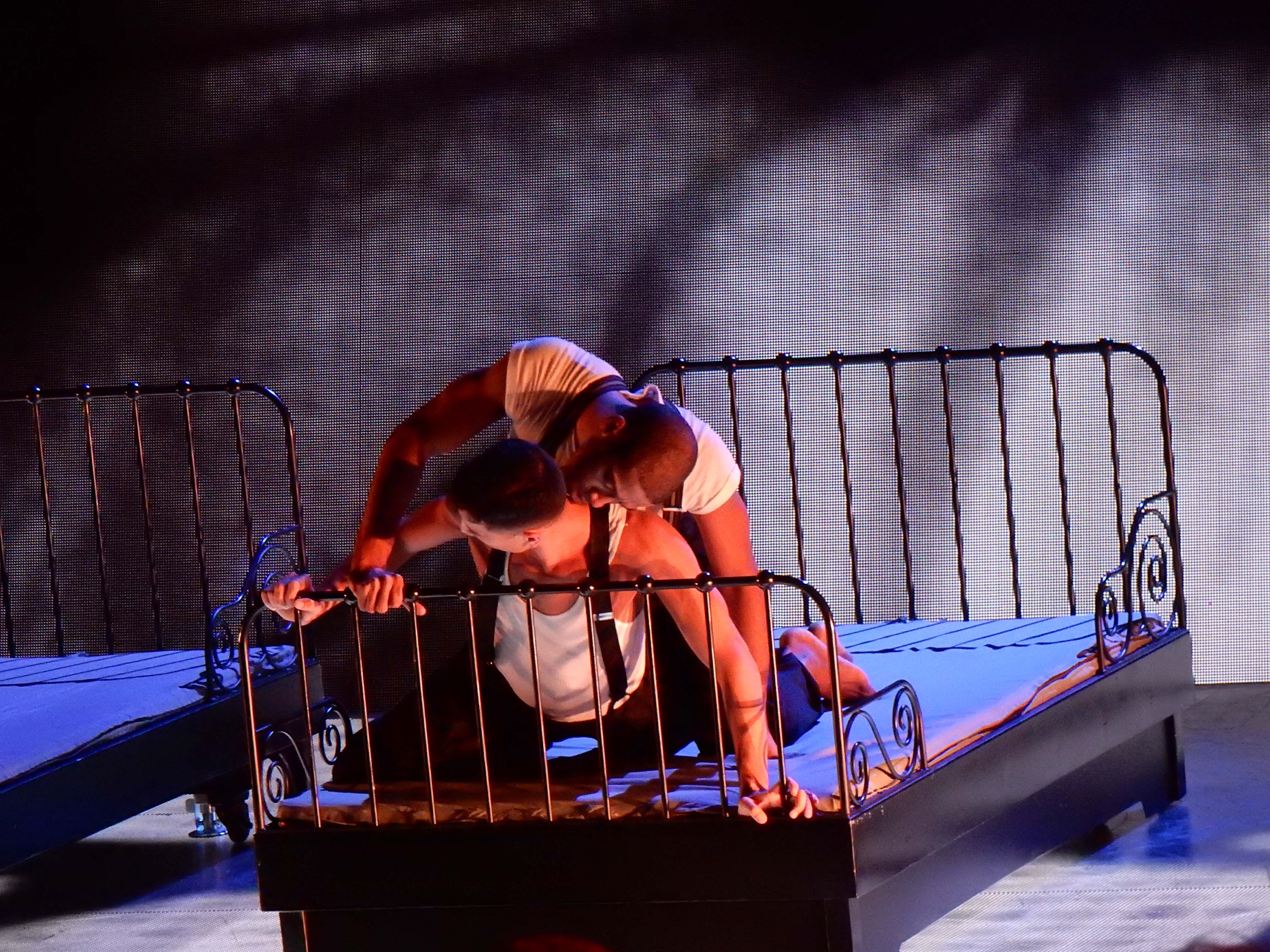
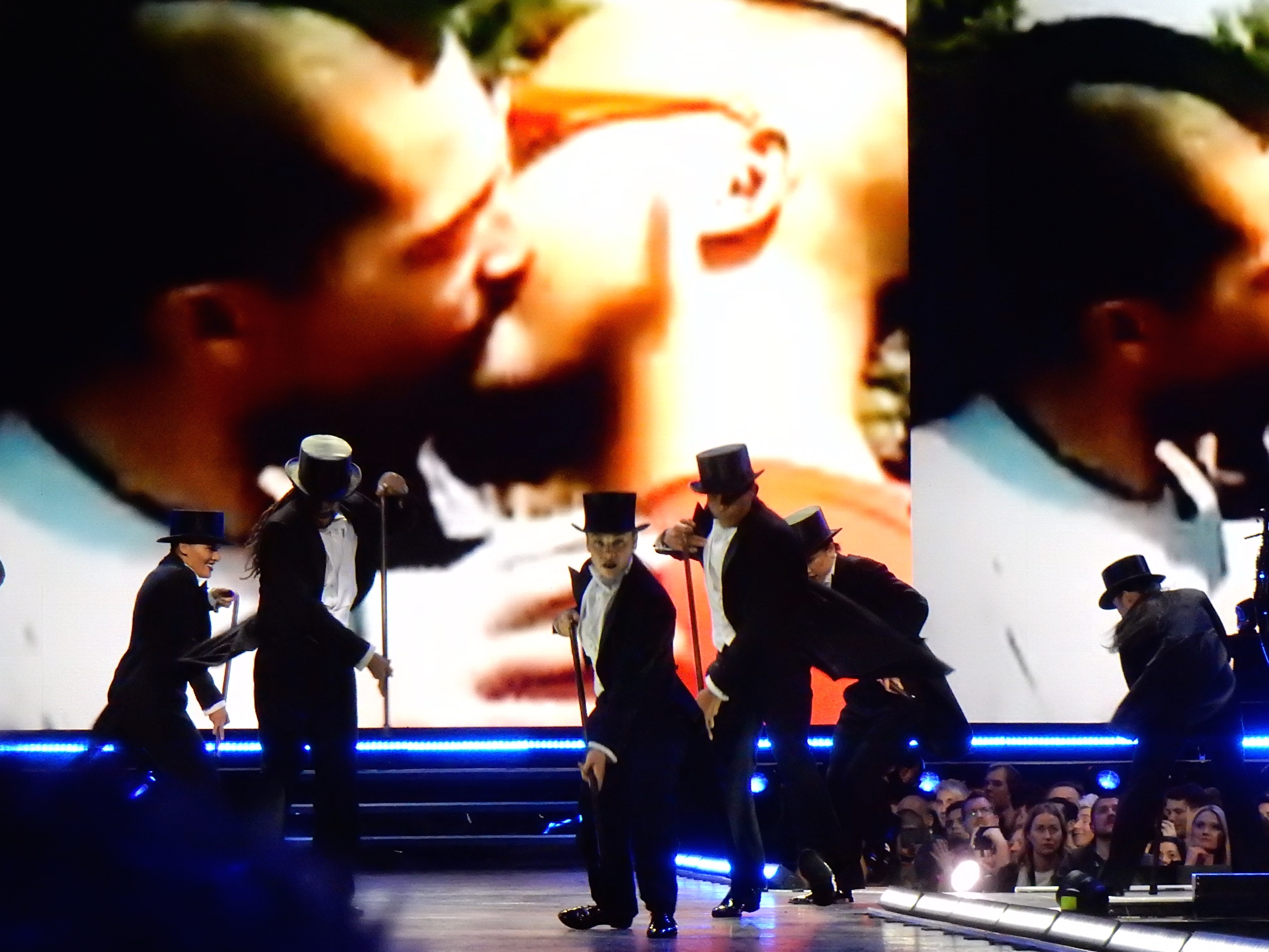
Images from her Rebel Heart Tour (2015—2016), grounded in LGBT eroticism

Other publications gave credit to Madonna for helping bring into the mainstream elements associated to both gay and queer culture. For instance, Mark Watts commented "she has done a lot to bring gay culture into the mass media". On the point, Darren Scott from The Independent felt and commented in 2018: "Her relentless insistence on treating us like the equals that we actually are meant that gay culture became part of the mainstream". Musto believes she helped brought gay audiences to "center stage", along with others like Cyndi Lauper. British writer Matthew Todd, in 2020, recalled her celebrity status, saying she "brought gay culture directly into the living rooms of the public", having "men dance together in her tours ... all the time speaking about homophobia in interviews".

Editors of Sontag and the Camp Aesthetic (2017), also agree that "in many ways, Madonna contributed to making gay mainstream" and "part of this contribution was her colonization of queer male, non-white subculture to the benefit of modern queer". Craig Takeuchi from The Georgia Straight also attributes her 1990's tour and Truth or Dare for "brought gay culture to the mainstream". Another observer, British writer Matt Cain attributed her for bringing gay culture into the mainstream as well. Writing for 20 minutos in 2019, José Casesmeiro gave also her a "fundamental" role to "normalize" the collective. Greek scholar Constantine Chatzipapatheodoridis, also argued she has been contributed in the socio-artistic evolution of queer culture worldwide, while Alex Hopper of American Songwriter as do others, explained that Madonna contributed to bringing ballroom culture and voguing into mainstream pop culture.

C. E. Crimmins in How The Homosexuals Saved Civilization (2004), called Madonna a "pioneer" explaining and considering her in the 1980s and 1990s as "the first homosexual icon to interact with her audience sexually (well, unless you count Judy Garland's marriages to gay men)". In similar connotations, John Leland explored for Newsweek in 1992, how Madonna incorporated mainstream homosexual sex, and Gina Vivinetto from The Advocate held in 2015, that since the 1980s "Madonna has been giving visibility to LGBT eroticism". Scott felt she helped change the way many people perceived gay sex.

==== Lesbianism ====
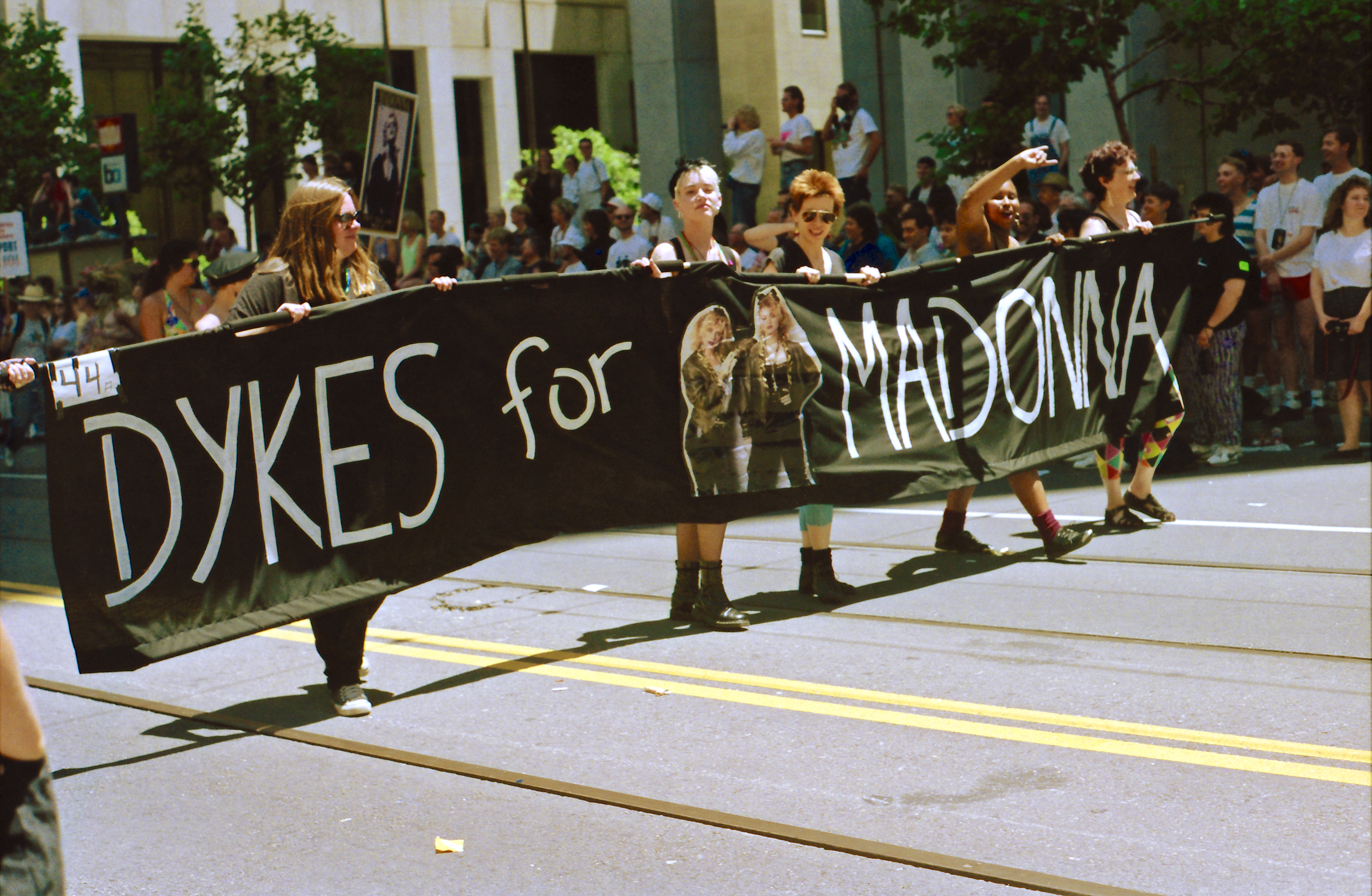
Dykes for Madonna at the 1991 San Francisco Pride

Mark Bego commented that her exploration of traditional gender roles helped make lesbianism more acceptable to mainstream society, in various cultural contours. In a 1989 article for Gay Community News, Sydney Pokorny refers the duo Madonna and Sandra Bernhard that inspired such devotion from lesbians. Lucy O'Brien cited an editor from lesbian-targeted magazine Diva whom described "Madonna became meaningful in the early nineties with that lesbian chic thing ... There was a hunger to see ourselves reflected in popular culture, and she made us visible". Writer Thomas Dyja in New York, New York, New York (2022), also lumped the public dilliance between Madonna and Bernhard along with Martina Navratilova and k.d. lang for ushering the lesbian chic. Torie Osborn, executive director of National LGBTQ Task Force asserted: "[She's] the first major woman pop star who's out and proud and fine about it. It signals a whole new era of possibility for celebrities". Osborn also credited k.d. lang in bringing a new peak for Lipstick lesbian. An author described Madonna, as the archetypal femme lesbian, regarded both the champion of sexual feminism and the pirate of traditional lesbian feminist lifestyles.

Madonna sparked again conversations after kissing Christina Aguilera and Britney Spears at the 2003 MTV Video Music Awards. Their kiss have been replicated numerous times, including by Israeli activists in 2019, to celebrate Madonna's arrival at the Eurovision Song Contest and to show that "love break down barriers", and in popular culture by celebrities like Kylie Jenner.

=== Influence on individuals ===
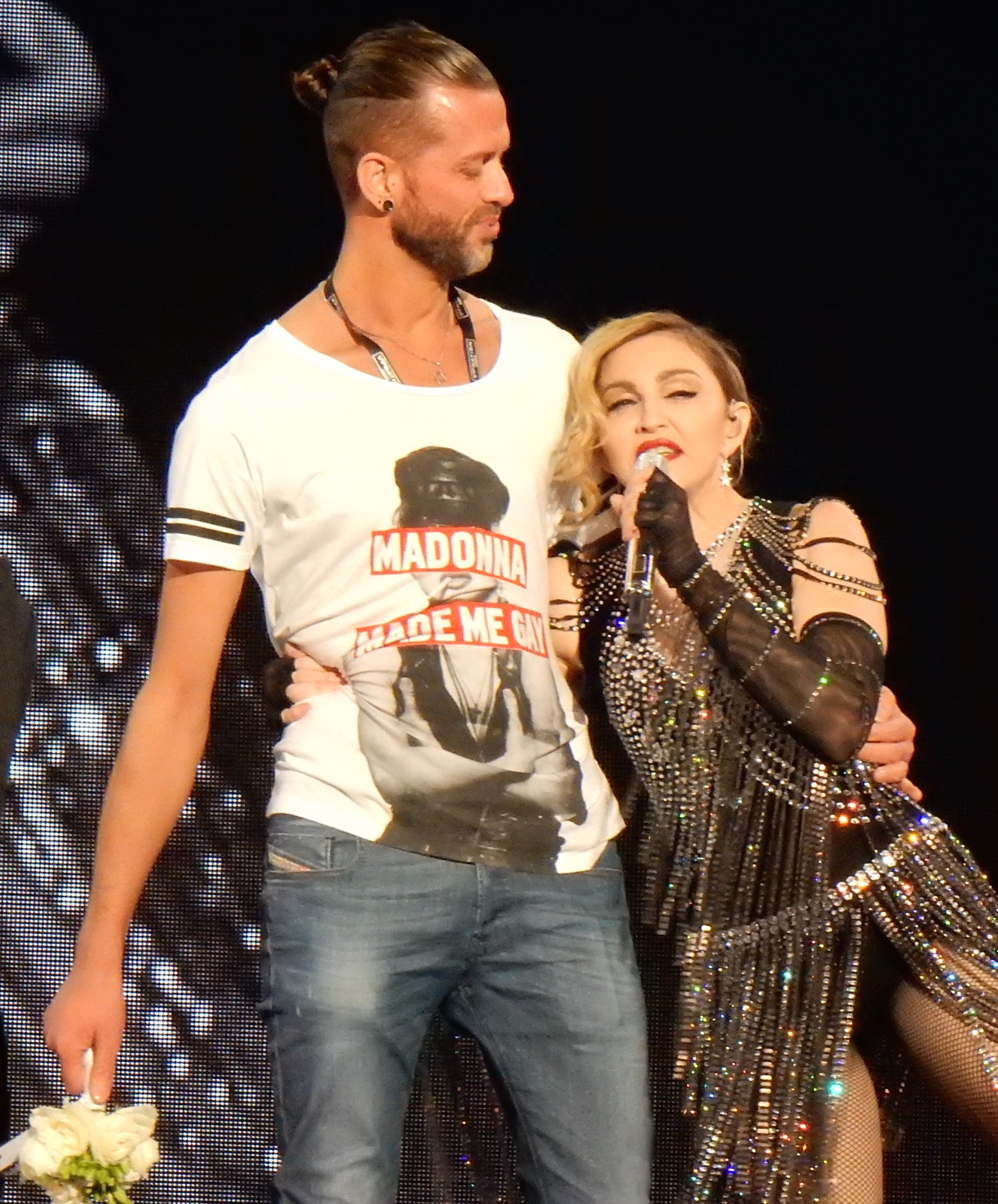
Madonna in 2015 with a fan whose T-shirt says "Madonna made me gay"

Other publications remarked Madonna's impact in the lives of some LGBT fans. In 2019, GLAAD's Sarah Kate Ellis said: "Her music and art have been life-saving outlets for LGBTQ people over the years and her affirming words and actions have changed countless hearts and minds". The Hollywood Reporter also remarked "her music and advocacy has positively affected the lives of LGBTQ people". In this regard, Madonna told: "It's a total reciprocation because, like I said in my speech (2019 GLAAD Media Awards), they made me feel not afraid to be different. And then I made them feel not afraid to be different". Commenting about her attitude that influenced others, in 2008, Babineau said she "was a chick with balls" and her attitude "resonated and continues to resonate" within gays and lesbians up that point.

Various public figures from the community such as Cain and musician Arca, have mentioned Madonna's impact in their lives addressing their LGBT background. Anderson Cooper noted the importance of Madonna to him as a teenegar. In 2015, Christopher Bergland commented that a performance she made in 1983 at a small gay club on Lansdowne St. in Boston, "changed his life". When Kim Petras became the first openly transgender woman to win a Grammy Award in February 2023, she thanked the singer in her acceptance speech for fighting for LGBTQ rights, saying "I don't think I could be here without Madonna". Commemorating her 60-years old birthday in 2018, The Advocate dedicated an article of love letters to Madonna that included commentaries from their staff, with many talking about her influence.

Madonna topped KBGO's 2011 rank of the "stars that helped their LGBTQ+ Fans Come Out". Agence France-Presse referred to her Truth or Dare film inspired many to coming out. Wesley Morris of The New York Times, said that maybe he knew was gay because of Truth or Dare. Ellen DeGeneres said that she was instrumental in her 1997 decision to come out. Rosie O'Donnell similarly credited Madonna to help her become more comfortable.

=== Depictions ===
Madonna has been depicted in diverse LGBT-media content, and events over the years, including various Pride Month. In 2017, Virtel considered Pride Month "is not the same without Madonna and her music". In 2022, a special show named "Madonna Made Me Gay" in Feast Festival was dedicated to her. In A Drag Queen's Guide to Life (2022), Bimini Bon Boulash wrote "would any queer inspiration be complete without the Queen of Pop herself?". LGBT-targeted publications such as The Advocate, Attitude, to DNA have created listicles about "Madonna's gayest moments". Other publications like HuffPost addressed similar lists.

In 2016, to pay tribute to her contributions to the LGBT community, contestants of the eighth season of reality competition show RuPaul's Drag Race were asked to render some of prominent Madonna looks on the runway. In effort to address the criticism the runway received for its repetitiveness, it was brought back for season nine. In season 12, the reality show paid tribute to Madonna again as the contestants performed in Madonna: The Unauthorized Rusical, a musical that chronicled her major accomplishments and contributions to the LGBT community. According to Billboard, Pose's season two was influenced by her.

Glee dedicated to Madonna an episode named "The Power of Madonna" accompanied with their first-ever EP released, Glee: The Music, The Power of Madonna. In Brian Tarquin's book The Insider's Guide to Music Licensing (2014), it was mentioned the importance of Madonna for their producers. Her episode was also the first time the music on Glee was turned over in its entirety to one performer. The documentary Strike a Pose (2016) is based in the dance troupe that accompanied Madonna in the documentary Truth or Dare and the Blond Ambition Tour; six of them were homosexual at a time when "homosexuality was much more taboo and associated by many straight people with illness", some recalled.

==== Sobriquets and listicles ====
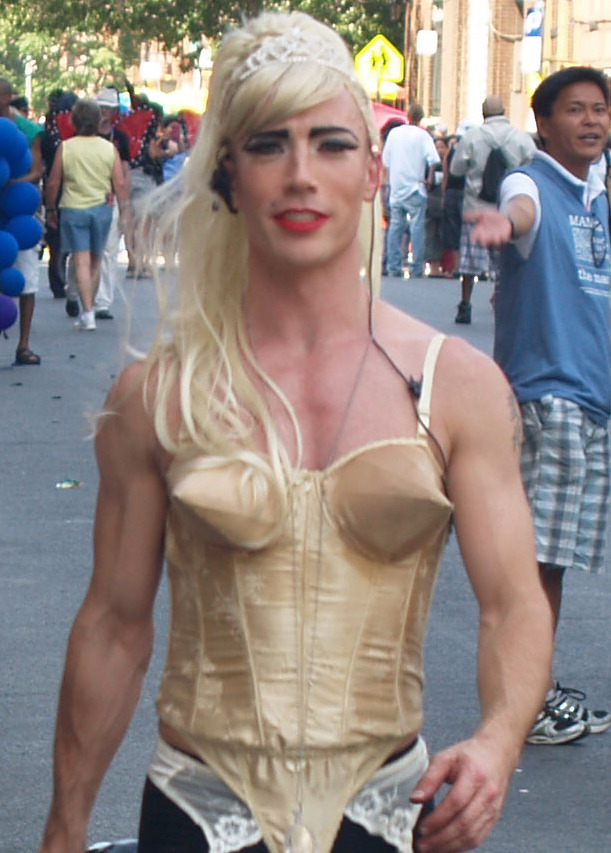
She has been imitated by drag queens.

Madonna has received many titles and sobriquets from gay press. Out called her a "true gay icon". In Queer (2002), editor Simon Gage explained that a UK gay magazine constantly referred to her as "Our Glorious Leader". She has been also referred to as a "queer icon" or "icon of queerness". Liberal gay theologian Robert Goss expressed: "For me, Madonna has been not only a queer icon but also a Christ icon who has dissolved the boundaries between queer culture and queer faith communities". Musicologist Sheila Whiteley wrote in her book Sexing the Groove: Popular Music and Gender (2013) that "Madonna came closer to any other contemporary celebrity in being an above-ground queer icon".

Madonna has appeared in books addressing significant Gay icons, including The Gay 100, and polls or journalistic listicles, including OnePoll's 2009 "Greatest Gay Icons of All Time". Others, have noted she garnered a substantial audience considering her to be "the greatest LGBTQ icon", as Samuel R. Murrian of Parade noted in 2019. On the point, in 2018, Diaz said she is "the biggest musical LGBTQ icon of all time" at least to an entire generation. Scholars Carmine Sarracino and Kevin Scott in The Porning of America (2008), attributed that calling her "the biggest gay icon of all time", was a result of her career-long popularity with gay audiences. Gage also referred to her as "the biggest gay icon of the 20th century". In 2006 and 2012, editors from The Advocate named her "the greatest gay icon".

== Internal criticism ==
Madonna has faced a variety of criticisms inside and outside of the LGBT community. According to Doris Leibetseder in Queer Tracks (2016), some feminists criticized her pluralistic queerness because it questions the concept of "woman" and "homosexual identities" and "ignores differences". Madonna has also been accused of using the "gay archive" for her own gain and for heterosexualising it according to Dutch academics in an article published on Celebrity Studies in 2013; Christopher Glazek describes the criticisms saying she's "getting rich on the appropriation and mining of gay subcultures". A scholar summed up that critics labeled her adoption more as appropriation than "convincing politics".

=== Discussions of appropriation ===
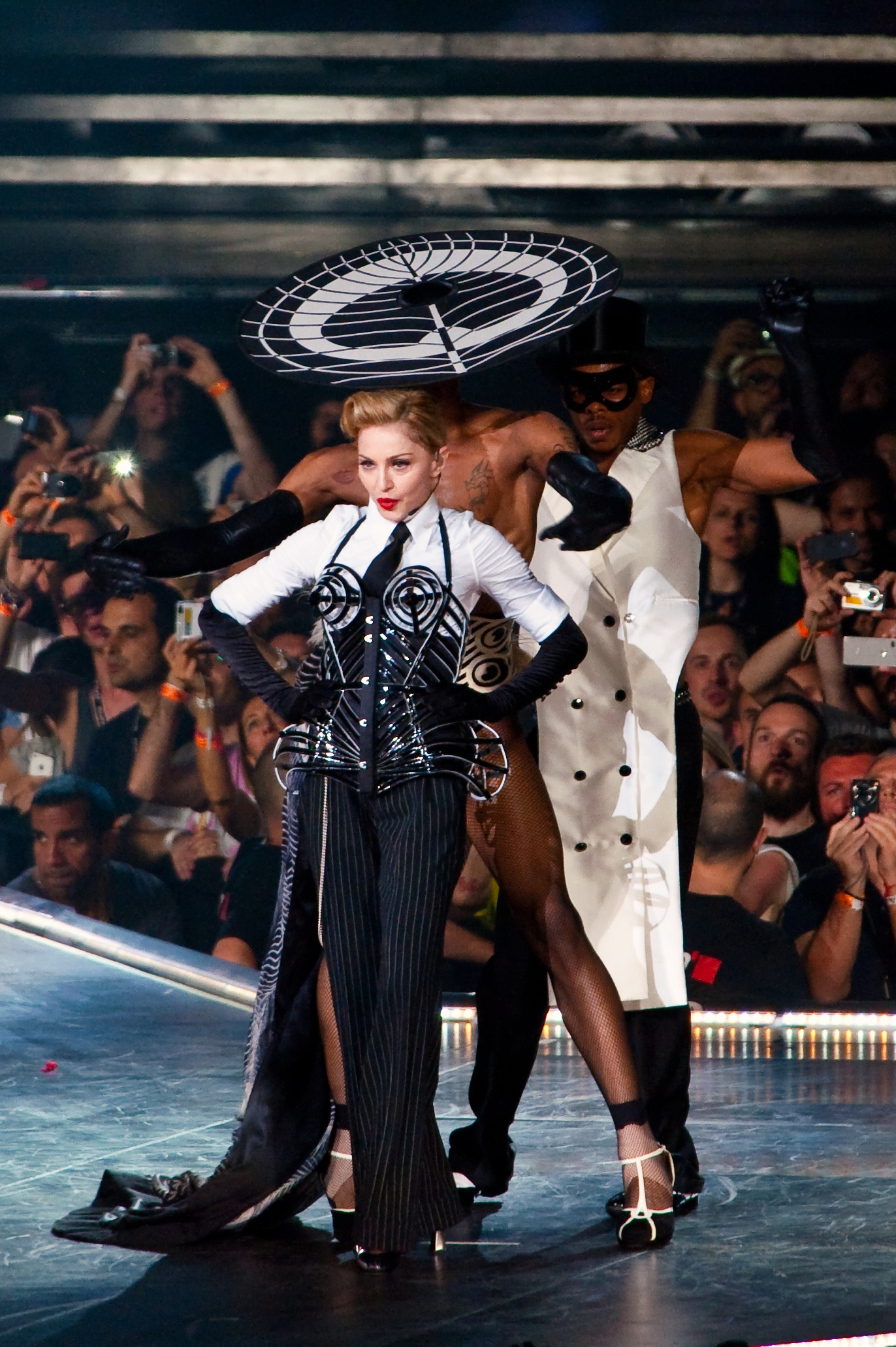
Madonna performing "Vogue" on The MDNA Tour in 2012. It drew praise but also criticism from some members of the collective, particularly many from the Black, and ballroom communities.

"Vogue" marked a significant point in criticizing Madonna because the song and video attracted criticisms of appropriation for not showing "real" voguing, although Billboard's Louis Virtel feels it shows both real and stylized non-voguing. Citing bell hooks' criticisms towards Madonna as example, editors of Intersectional Analysis as a Method to Analyze Popular Culture (2019), explains she is "typically credited as the first to use black gay culture, in a clear and forward way". Notoriously after the release of "Vogue", subcultural groups, including the Black community argued she "kitschified" their culture. Therefore, Madonna was viewed as a "straight white woman" that appropriated the movement for the white population, further been criticizing for song's lyrics that referred only white Hollywood stars. Thomas Adamson for Associated Press commented in 2018, "though black dancers featured in the video". In The New Zealand Herald, Lexie Cartwright echoed Billy Porter from television show Pose commentary of other female pop stars that "followed her steps" whom said "Without us, Madonna would be nothing, Beyoncé would be nothing, Lady Gaga would be nothing". Furthermore, others had conflicting and mixed views, including Mickey Boardman giving her praise for offer work to ballroom dancers, while Jose Xtravaganza retorted the criticism by saying "she didn't steal it, she did it with us". Though she recognized Madonna's impact, Angelica Ross felt there were maybe "missed opportunities". In similar approaches, others felt she positioned the dance expression as a fad when brought it into the masses.

With the rise of the term queerbaiting since 2010s, Madonna has been one of several public figures accused of it. In 2004, Dick Hall, assistant headmaster at The Lovett School discussed with MedicineNet the Britney Spears-Madonna influence in the raise of the term Celesbian. The divisive perceptions towards Madonna, was remarked back in a 1993 article of the Australasian Gay & Lesbian Law Journal, describing it as "nowhere has this issue been more hotly debated than in Madonna's 'relationship' with gay and lesbian subcultures". However, Madonna has responded to questions about her sexuality, answering as early as 1994 that she doesn't "think about labels" and acknowledged past sexual attraction to women.

Other different individuals have expressed conflicting views on Madonna both for her early activism and also for her representation of the community. Musto notoriously "spoofed" her, as a mainstream public figure talking about "gay awareness" was not a favorable thing in his view. Musto said that the term "gay ally" gets tossed around too much, as "if we're supposed to turn somersaults of joy just because someone famous thinks we're actually acceptable human beings who deserve equal rights". However, in 2015, Musto toned down critical commentaries he made. Guy Babineau from LGBT-focused publication Xtra Magazine, in 2008, had also ambiguous views on Madonna, lumping her with contemporary industry fellows such as Michael Jackson and Prince to say "all benefited from their popularity in gay clubs", each "affecting an androgynous, outrageous and supercharged sexual persona", although he recognizes that she "credited" the gay community and "glorified" them.

In 2015, Glazek suggested that censuring Madonna for "ransacking gay subcultures could be viewed as just another variation on the time-honored practice of devaluing the accomplishments of female recording artists". In 2017, Tom Breihan from Stereogum describes: "Madonna also loved LGBTQ culture, to the point where she's often been accused of exploiting it". In 2020, Gonçalves explained that since her early career, Madonna opted for diversity, hiring homosexual dancers, Latinos and Blacks further playing with identities that were largely ignored in mainstream culture. In 2022, with the release of Beyoncé's "Break My Soul (The Queens Remix)", The New York Times critic Jon Caramanica saw how both singers have received criticisms from Queer critics, while he added "Madonna is still demonstrating her ongoing, deep engagement with queer culture".

==== Controversies ====
Madonna has also faced controversies inside the community. In early 2000s, she was criticized by public figures like Janeane Garofalo when reportedly she defended public perception of Eminem's "homophobic statements". In Life with My Sister Madonna (2008), Madonna's brother Christopher Ciccone accused her then-spouse Guy Ritchie of being "homophobic" which also contributed to fracture siblings' relationship. Ritchie shut down claims. Ciccone also claimed her sister outed him in an interview with The Advocate without asking his permission. In early 2020s, she was mentioned among gay icons ranging from Elton John to Lady Gaga and Beyoncé for performing in the United Arab Emirates, a country with "records of human rights violations", including LGBT rights as per noted Martha Ross from Boston Herald.

On Internet, Madonna caused social media reactions after a TikTok video posted on October 22, in 2022 with the on-screen caption, "If I miss, I'm Gay"; she then throws the panties toward a nearby wastebasket, and "intentionally" failed. Samantha Chery from Washington Post, noted her video was posted two days early of the National Coming Out Day. Similarly, in 2014, Madonna caused internet reactions by using the word "gay" to define Russian president Vladimir Putin and vegetables kale, in a BuzzFeed associated-word game. Attitude staffers recalled she was not the only gay icon/pop star that made insinuations about Putin's sexuality, and magazine's editor Ben Kelly also remarked her humor. BuzzFeed's editor Matt Stopera also remarked the humor in an article titled "Kale Comes Out As Gay". She was criticized by using a hashtag "#DidItFirst" when Lil Nas X kissed a male dancer in 2021. Lil himself, defended Madonna by saying "me and Madonna are friends. It's a joke".

== Cultural and social criticisms ==
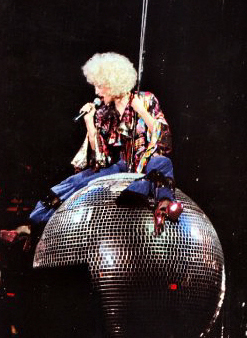
Madonna seen in her performance of "Express Yourself" during the 1993's Girlie Show

In her early career, she was accused for "being irresponsible because of her support for gay culture", as noted Matt Cain, after the release of Like a Prayer in 1989. Madonna's popularity among young audiences, her embrace of sexuality, and her support for the community drew additional criticisms and raised cultural concerns in some sectors; different pro-family, political, and religious groups accused her of promoting homosexuality and immorality, including in 1993 during her Girlie Show, leading an unprecedented debate in the Mexican Chamber of Deputies. Similarly, during 1990's Blond Ambition World Tour and 1991's Truth or Dare, she wadded into debate of the 1988's section 28 by Margaret Thatcher, a law that prohibited the intentional "promotion of homosexuality" in the United Kingdom. She was accused of not only promoting homosexuality but also normalizing it. In 2012, author Nicholas C. Charles denounced: "Madonna uses her videos as a weapon to desensitize and demoralize her millions of fans into accepting the destructive practices of homosexuality as normative".

During a Nightline interview in the early 1990s, when asked about her sexual irresponsibility, Madonna responded: "Why are images of degradation and violence toward women okay, almost mainstream, yet images of two women or two men kissing taboo?". Lynne Layton, a Harvard University lecturer in women's studies made a reference for her statement agreeing with it. However, in 1995, Los Angeles Times reacted skeptical with The Advocate naming Madonna "Sissy of the Year", as she presented to her audience "ambiguous" and "mystical" about many things, including sexuality. But they agree: "Two things she is very firm about is her support for the lesbian and gay community and doing something about HIV/AIDS".

=== Russian incidents ===
Madonna speaking against the Russian anti-LGBT law during a concert of the MDNA Tour in Russia

During her Russian stop of The MDNA Tour in 2012, Madonna criticized the Russian anti-LGBT law. She drew criticism from the Russian government and caused opponents of gay-rights to sue her as the claimants argued that Madonna's performance would adversely affect Russia's birth rate and therefore its ability to maintain a proper army. One of the claimants told the court: "In the coming years, this type of violation could become the norm. But we have created a precedent —any artist coming to our city will know now what laws exist".

To various Western viewers it reaffirmed, if not initiated, the connection between liberal gay rights issues and Pussy Riot, according to authors in Rethinking Gender in Popular Culture in the 21st Century (2017). Miriam Elder, correspondent of The Guardian in Moscow said that Russian politicians widely criticized Madonna, with a senior official calling her a "moralising slut".

Madonna also joined a Human Rights Campaign's "Love Conquers Hate" to support Russian LGBT community in early December 2013. After the release of Channel 4's documentary Hunted around 2014 which depicts how gay Russians are "routinely sought and tortured by gangs", Madonna said she was the target of death threats after she went against Russian anti-LGBT law. Initially, media reported she was sued more than $10 million for "promoting homosexuality" in Russia, and in July 2020, eight years after the incident, she revealed that she was given a $1 million fine by the Russian government, which she never paid.

== See also ==
- LGBT history
- Madonna studies
- Madonna and sexuality

== Book sources ==
- Apelqvist, Eva (2013). LGBTQ Families: The Ultimate Teen Guide. Scarecrow Press. ISBN 978-0810885370.
- Boulash, Bimini Bon (2022). A Drag Queen's Guide to Life. Random House. ISBN 978-0241996751.
- Braunshtein, Doron (2019), "Madonna: the gratest gay obsession: interpreting the essence of the emotion, the rational and the never-seen-before admiration by gays towards the greatest diva in the world",
- Charles, Nicholas C. (2012). From Worldly to Christian Wisdom and Truth. Trafford Publishing. ISBN 978-1466906396.
- Chatzipapatheodoridis, Constantine (2021). The Music Diva Spectacle. Intellect Books. ISBN 978-1789384383.
- Crimmins, C. E (2004). How The Homosexuals Saved Civilization: The True and Heroic Story of How Gay Men Shaped The Modern World. Jeremy P. Tarcher. ISBN 9781585423149.
- Dicker, Rory; Piepmeier, Alison (2016). Catching a Wave: Reclaiming Feminism for the 21st Century. Northeastern University Press. ISBN 978-1555538569.
- Drushel, Bruce E.; Peters, Brian M. (2017). Sontag and the Camp Aesthetic: Advancing New Perspectives. Lexington Books. ISBN 978-1498537773.
- Dyja, Thomas (2022). New York, New York, New York: Four Decades of Success, Excess, and Transformation. Simon and Schuster. ISBN 978-1982149796.
- Edwards, Erica B.; Esposito, Jennifer (2019). Intersectional Analysis as a Method to Analyze Popular Culture. Taylor & Francis. ISBN 978-0-429-55700-2.
- Fellner, Astrid M.; Fernández-Morales, Marta; Martausová, Martina (2017). Rethinking Gender in Popular Culture in the 21st Century. Cambridge Scholars Publishing. ISBN 978-1527505285.
- Flynn, Paul (2017). Good As You: From Prejudice to Pride – 30 Years of Gay Britain. Random House. ISBN 978-1473529175.
- Fouz-Hernández, Santiago; Jarman-Ivens, Freya (2004). Madonna's Drowned Worlds: New Approaches to her Cultural Transformations, 1983-2003. Routledge. ISBN 1351559540.
- Foster, David W. (2014). Chicano/Latino Homoerotic Identities. Routledge. ISBN 978-1317944454.
- Gabriel, Mary (2023). Madonna: A Rebel Life. Little, Brown. ISBN 978-0316456449.
- Gage, Simon (2002). Queer. Thunder's Mouth Press. ISBN 1560253770.
- Garde-Hansen, Joanne (2011). Media and Memory. Edinburgh University Press. ISBN 978-0748647071.
- Gnojewski, Carol (2007). Madonna: Express Yourself. Enslow Publishers. ISBN 978-0766024427.
- Gnojewski, Carol (2017). Madonna: Fighting for Self-Expression. Enslow Publishers. ISBN 978-0766095526.
- Goss, Robert (2002). Queering Christ: Beyond Jesus Acted Up. United Church of Christ . Pilgrim Press. ISBN 0-8298-1498-1.
- Guilbert, Georges-Claude (2015). Madonna as Postmodern Myth. McFarland. ISBN 978-0-786-48071-5.
- Guilbert, Georges-Claude (2018). Gay Icons: The (Mostly) Female Entertainers Gay Men Love. McFarland & Company. ISBN 978-1476633015.
- Hamer, Diane; Budge, Belinda (1994). The Good, the Bad and the Gorgeous: Popular Culture's Romance with Lesbianism. Pandora. ISBN 0044409109.
- Herbrechter, Stefan (2016). Returning (to) Communities. Brill Publishers. ISBN 978-9004325623.
- Knowles, Elizabeth (2007). Oxford Dictionary of Modern Quotations. OUP Oxford. ISBN 978-0199208951.
- Landrum, Gene N. (1994). Profiles of Female Genius: Thirteen Creative Women who Changed the World. Prometheus Books. ISBN 0-87975-892-9.
- Laney, Lewis (2020). The Little Book of Pride: The History, the People, the Parades. Ryland Peters & Small. ISBN 978-1912983254.
- Leibetseder, Doris (2016). Queer Tracks: Subversive Strategies in Rock and Pop Music. Routledge. ISBN 978-1317072584.
- Lin, Jeremy Atherton (2021). Gay Bar: Why We Went Out. Hachette UK. ISBN 978-0316458740.
- O'Brien, Lucy (2007). Madonna: Like an Icon. Bantam Press. ISBN 978-0-593-05547-2.
- Peraino, Judith A. (2006). Listening to the Sirens: Musical Technologies of Queer Identity from Homer to Hedwig. University of California Press. ISBN 0-520-92174-7.
- Real, Michael R. (1996). Exploring Media Culture: A Guide. SAGE Publishing. ISBN 0803958765.
- Rettenmund, Matthew (1995). Encyclopedia Madonnica. St. Martin's Press. ISBN 978-0312117825.
- Robertson, Pamela (1996). Guilty pleasures: Feminist camp from Mae West to Madonna. I.B. Tauris. ISBN 1860640877.
- Russell, Paul Elliot (2002). The gay 100: A Ranking of the Most Influential Gay Men and Lesbians, Past and Present. Kensington Books. ISBN 0758201001.
- Sanneh, Kelefa (2021). Major Labels: A History of Popular Music in Seven Genres. Canongate Books. ISBN 978-1-83885-595-6.
- Sarracino, Carmine; Scott, Kevin M. (2002). The Porning of America: The Rise of Porn Culture, what it Means, and where We Go from Here. Beacon Press. ISBN 978-0-8070-6153-4.
- Schwichtenberg, Cathy (1993). The Madonna Connection. Westview Press. ISBN 0813313961.
- Stange, Mary Zeiss; Oyster, Carol K.; Sloan, Jane E. (2011). Encyclopedia of Women in Today's World. Vol. 1. SAGE Publishing. ISBN 978-1-4129-7685-5.
- Tarquin, Brian (2014). The Insider's Guide to Music Licensing. Simon and Schuster. ISBN 978-1621534075.
- Todd, Matthew (2020). Pride: The Story of the LGBTQ Equality Movement. Simon and Schuster. ISBN 978-1681885230.
- Walker, John A. (1993). Arts TV: A History of Arts Television in Britain. Indiana University Press. ISBN 0861964357.
- Walker, John A. (2003). Art and Celebrity. Pluto Press. ISBN 0745318509.
- Whiteley, Sheila (2013) [1st pub. 1997]. Sexing the Groove: Popular Music and Gender. Routledge. ISBN 978-1-135-10512-9.
