= Eld =

Eld or ELD may refer to:

== Arts and entertainment ==
- Eld (album), by Norwegian band Enslaved
- Fire (Elfgren and Strandberg novel) (Swedish: Eld)

== Organisations ==
- Economics of Land Degradation Initiative, promotes sustainable land use globally
- Union of People's Democracy, a defunct political party in Greece
- Elections Department Singapore, government agency in Singapore

== People ==
- Eld (surname)
- Eld Martin (1886–1968), Canadian politician

== Technology ==
- ELD glass, extraordinary low-dispersion glass
- Electroluminescent display
- Electronic logging device

== Other uses ==
- acronym for English Language Development, any teaching program for English Language Learners
- Old age
- South Arkansas Regional Airport at Goodwin Field

== See also ==
- Elder (disambiguation)
