= Eld (surname) =

Eld is a surname, and may refer to:

- George Eld (died 1624), English printer
- George Eld (antiquary) (1791–1862), English antiquary
- Henry Eld (1814–1850), United States Navy officer and explorer

== See also ==
- Elder (surname)
- Auld, surname
- Old (surname)
