= Gary Indiana (writer) =

American writer, playwright and poet (1950–2024)

- Indiana on the cover of his book White Trash Boulevard published in 1988 by Hanuman Books
- Born: Gary Hoisington; July 16, 1950; Derry, New Hampshire, U.S.
- Died: October 23, 2024 (aged 74); New York City, U.S.
- Occupations: Writer; filmmaker; artist; actor; critic

Signature
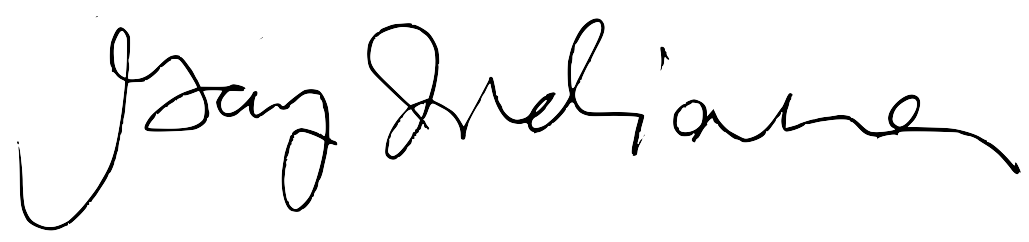

Gary Hoisington (July 16, 1950 – October 23, 2024), known as Gary Indiana, was an American writer, actor, artist, and cultural critic. He served as the art critic for the Village Voice weekly newspaper from 1985 to 1988. Indiana is best known for his classic American true-crime trilogy, Resentment, Three Month Fever: The Andrew Cunanan Story, and Depraved Indifference, chronicling the state of "depraved indifference" that characterized American life at the millennium's end. Former Artforum editor David Velasco called him "the greatest living writer."

== Background ==
Gary Hoisington was born in Derry, New Hampshire, on July 16, 1950. After a childhood rife with bullying and mistreatment, he left home when he was 16. His feeling of being a foreigner in his hometown contributed to his early love for European literature and set him on the path to becoming a writer. He particularly loved Russian psychological novels and French existentialist philosophy, because he realized very young that he was not going to believe in God. Sartre made him feel less alone in the world; Dostoyevsky appealed to his anti-authoritarianism.

Hoisington enrolled at the University of California, Berkeley, but did not graduate. Hoisington later moved to San Francisco, and then Los Angeles; it was in LA in the early 1970s when he began using the name "Gary Indiana." In 1978, he moved to New York City.

On October 23, 2024, Indiana died from lung cancer at his apartment in the East Village of Manhattan, at the age of 74.

In January 2025, Indiana's personal library was destroyed in the Eaton Fire.

== Writing ==
Indiana wrote, directed, and acted in a dozen plays, mostly during the early 1980s. He performed in small New York City venues like Mudd Club, Club 57, the Performing Garage and the backyard of Bill Rice's East 3rd Street studio. Earlier plays included Alligator Girls Go to College (1979); Curse of the Dog People (1980); A Coupla White Faggots Sitting Around Talking (1980), which was filmed by Michel Auder in 1981; The Roman Polanski Story (1981); Phantoms of Louisiana (1981), and Roy Cohn/Jack Smith (1992), written with Jack Smith for performance artist Ron Vawter. The latter was filmed in 1994 by Jill Godmilow.

In the early 1980s, Indiana contributed essays on mid-century art to Artforum and Art in America, which led to a position as the Village Voice's Art Critic from 1985 to 1988. Despite the success of his columnist stint, which supplied him with material he would soon repurpose in his first novel, Horse Crazy, Indiana wrote in his 2015 memoir that his prolific mid-80s output amounted to “a bunch of yellowing newspaper columns I never republished and haven’t cared about for a second since writing them a quarter century ago.” In 2018, Bruce Hainley convinced Indiana to allow Semiotext(e) to republish the columns in a collection called Vile Days. Some of the columns also appeared in an earlier collection of Indiana's later nonfiction writing, Let It Bleed: Essays, 1985–1995, published in 1996.

Indiana's first three novels were set in New York City during the AIDS crisis. In the mid-1990s, he turned his attention to the city of Los Angeles, where he lived off and on throughout his life. He called Resentment "a love letter to LA," with its "strange noctural life" and "the feeling of apocalypse just over the horizon."

A later play, Mrs. Watson's Missing Parts, was staged in May 2013 at Participant Inc. It drastically alters a 1922 Grand Guignol theatrical adaptation of Octave Mirbeau's novel The Torture Garden by replacing all dialogue with an "almost incomprehensible" obscenity-laden libidinal glossolalia.

Indiana's memoir triggered a new wave of interest in his work, leading to a consensus among cultural critics that this "Renaissance man" was having a renaissance. In 2017, Three Month Fever was reissued with a new introduction by Christopher Glazek, who coined the phrase 'deflationary realism' to describe Indiana's writing, in contrast to the magical realism or hysterical realism of other contemporary writing. In 2018, Seven Stories Press reissued Horse Crazy with a new introduction by the literary critic Tobi Haslett and Gone Tomorrow with a new introduction by Sarah Nicole Prickett. Both Haslett and Prickett, along with other younger critics and cultural figures in Indiana's new milieu, including Christian Lorentzen, Sam McKinniss, and Janique Vigier, contributed significantly to the critical reappraisal of Indiana's work. In 2023, Indiana's 1994 novel Rent Boy was reissued by McNally Jackson, under their McNally Editions imprint, and Semiotext(e) reissued his 2003 novel Do Everything in the Dark. In 2024, Seven Stories Press reissued his 2015 memoir, I Can Give You Anything But Love.

== Film ==
Indiana acted in several mostly experimental films by, among others, Michel Auder (Seduction of Patrick, 1979, which he co-wrote with the director), Scott B and Beth B (The Trap Door, 1980), Melvie Arslanian (Stiletto, 1981, where he plays a bellhop at the bellhopless Chelsea Hotel), Jackie Raynal (Hotel New York, 1984), Ulrike Ottinger (Dorian Gray in the Mirror of the Yellow Press, 1984, with Veruschka as Dorian Gray and Delphine Seyrig as Doctor Mabuse), Lothar Lambert (Fräulein Berlin, 1984), Dieter Schidor (Cold in Columbia, 1985), Valie Export (The Practice of Love, 1985) and Christoph Schlingensief (Terror 2000: Intensivstation Deutschland, 1994, in which Udo Kier kills his character with a machine gun). John Boskovich's 2001 film North features Indiana reading from the Céline novel of the same name.

Indiana's novel Gone Tomorrow reflects his experiences on set, particularly his time working on Cold in Columbia.

Speaking of his acting style generally, Indiana told an interviewer, "I wasn't trained, and certainly didn't have the technique of a professional. Directors would cast me because of the way I was, not what I could pretend to be."

== Art ==
Indiana's video Stanley Park (2013) was included in the 2014 Whitney Biennial. Combining footage of a former Cuban prison, the Panopticon-like Presidio Modelo, jellyfish, and cuts from the films Touch of Evil and The Shanghai Gesture, the work connects the consequences of global environmental degradation with increasingly repressive governmental practices. Used as a metaphor for state surveillance, the jellyfish was described by Indiana as "an organism with no brain and a thousand poisonous tentacles collecting what you could call data." Photographs of young Cuban men appeared next to the video.

Semiotext(e) published 22 pamphlets for the biennial, including Indiana's A Significant Loss of Human Life, which extends the video's themes by juxtaposing the artist's experiences of Cuba as it is slowly being drawn into the global economy with commentary on the ideas of Karl Marx.

In addition to Stanley Park, publicly screened video art by Indiana includes Soap (2004–2012), inspired by the Francis Ponge poem; Plutot la vie (2005), concerning the Society of the Spectacle and mass hypnosis; Unfinished Story (2004–2005), which records readings by and conversations between Indiana and photographer Lynn Davis; and Young Ginger (2014).

== Bibliography ==
=== Fiction ===
- (1987) Scar Tissue and Other Stories ISBN 978-0930762094
- (1988) White Trash Boulevard ISBN 978-0937815205
- (1989) Horse Crazy ISBN 978-0802111104
- (1991) Disorderly Conduct: The VLS Fiction Reader (contributor) ISBN 978-1852422455
- (1993) Gone Tomorrow ISBN 978-1852423360
- (1994) Rent Boy ISBN 978-1852423247
- (1994) Living With the Animals (editor, contributor) ISBN 978-0571198504
- (1997) Resentment: A Comedy ISBN 978-1584351726
- (1999) Three Month Fever: The Andrew Cunanan Story ISBN 978-1584351986
- (2002) Depraved Indifference ISBN 978-0060197261
- (2003) Do Everything in the Dark ISBN 978-0312312053
- (2009) The Shanghai Gesture ISBN 978-0982015100
- (2010) Last Seen Entering the Biltmore: Plays, Short Fiction, Poems 1975–2010 ISBN 978-1584350903
- (2011) To Whom It May Concern (limited edition artist's book with Louise Bourgeois) ISBN 978-1900828369
- (2016) Tiny Fish that Only Want to Kiss ISBN 978-0991219667

=== Nonfiction ===
- (1987) Lucas Samaras: Chairs and Drawings (for Pace Gallery) ISBN 978-9997028365
- (1987) Roberto Juarez (for Robert Miller Gallery)
- (1989) Life Under Neon: Paintings and Drawings of Times Square 1981–1988 (Jane Dickson catalogue for Goldie Paley Gallery, Moore College of Art and Design; contributor)
- (1996) Let It Bleed: Essays 1985–1995 ISBN 978-1852423322
- (1996) Aura Rosenberg: Head Shots ISBN 978-1881616566
- (1997) Front Pages (Nancy Chunn catalogue for the Corcoran Gallery of Art; contributor) ISBN 978-0847820818
- (1997) Hunt Slonem: Exotica (for Colby College Museum of Art; contributor) ISBN 978-0964444836
- (1998) Christopher Wool (for the Los Angeles Museum of Contemporary Art; contributor) ISBN 978-3931141912
- (1999) Barbara Kruger: Thinking of You (for the Museum of Contemporary Art; contributor) ISBN 978-0262112505
- (2000) Valie Export: Ob/De+Con(Struction) (for Goldie Paley Gallery, Moore College of Art and Design; contributor) ISBN 978-1584420514
- (2000) BFI Film Classics: Salò or The 120 Days of Sodom ISBN 978-0851708072
- (2004) BFI Film Classics: Viridiana ISBN 978-1844570416
- (2004) John Waters: Change of Life (for the New Museum of Contemporary Art; contributor) ISBN 978-0810943063
- (2005) The Schwarzenegger Syndrome: Politics and Celebrity in the Age of Contempt ISBN 978-1565849518
- (2005) Kathe Burkhart: Bad Girl: Works from 1983–2000 ISBN 978-0976544302
- (2005) Paul Kostabi ISBN 978-8888064482
- (2006) Cameron Jamie (contributor) ISBN 978-3775717267
- (2008) Utopia's Debris: Selected Essays ISBN 978-0465002481
- (2009) Paul Pfeiffer (contributor) ISBN 978-8496954595
- (2009) Chaos and Night by Henry de Montherlant (introduction to the NYRB Classics edition) ISBN 978-1590173046
- (2010) Dike Blair: Now and Again (for the Weatherspoon Art Museum; contributor) ISBN 978-1890949129
- (2010) Andy Warhol and the Can that Sold the World ISBN 978-0465002337
- (2010) Roni Horn: Well and Truly (for Kunsthaus Bregenz; contributor) ISBN 978-3865608161
- (2010) Coma by Pierre Guyotat (introduction to the Semiotext(e) edition) ISBN 978-1584350897
- (2011) Dead Flowers (monograph on Timothy Carey; contributor) ISBN 978-0980232424
- (2012) Bye Bye American Pie (for MALBA Fundación Costantini, Buenos Aires) ISBN 978-9871271429
- (2013) Damián Aquiles ISBN 978-8881588688
- (2014) Edgewise: A Picture of Cookie Mueller (contributor) ISBN 978-3942214209
- (2014) A Significant Loss of Human Life ISBN 978-1584351504
- (2015) Tracey Emin: Angel Without You (for the Museum of Contemporary Art North Miami; contributor) ISBN 978-0847841158
- (2015) I Can Give You Anything But Love ISBN 978-0847846863
- (2015) Tal R: Altstadt Girl (for Cheim & Read) ISBN 978-0991468157
- (2017) Roni Horn (contributor) ISBN 978-3791356600
- (2018) Ivory Pearl by Jean-Patrick Manchette (afterword for the NYRB Classics edition) ISBN 978-1681372105
- (2018) Vile Days: The Village Voice Art Columns, 1985–1988 ISBN 978-1635900378

=== Critical studies and essays on Indiana's work ===
- (1992) Shopping in Space: Essays on American "Blank Generation" Fiction by Elizabeth Young, Graham Caveney ISBN 978-1852422554
- (1998) Blank Fictions: Consumerism, Culture and the Contemporary American Novel by James Annesley ISBN 978-0312215347
- Andrew Marzoni (Fall 2017). "Louche Life: The Literary Crimes of Gary Indiana". The Quarterly Conversation (49). Archived from the original on September 25, 2017.
- Francine Prose (December 3, 2015). "A Talent for the Low & High". The New York Review of Books. 62 (19). (subscription required)
- Christopher Glazek (Winter 2016). "Cunanan/Bovary". Semiotext(e)/Native Agents.
- Tobi Haslett (Fall 2016). "Modern Love". N+1 (26).
- Sarah Nicole Prickett (October 4, 2018). "The Dry-Eyed Mourning of Gary Indiana." LitHub.
- Jeremy Lybarger (November 8, 2018). "Chronicling the Last Days of Old New York". Boston Review.
- Paul McAdory (April 28, 2022). "Gary Indiana Hates in Order to Love." Gawker.
- Harry Tafoya (February 20, 2023). "Down There: A Review of Rent Boy by Gary Indiana." Substack.
- Bailey Trela (August 22, 2023). " Pathologies of the Après Garde: On Gary Indiana's "Rent Boy." The Cleveland Review of Books.
