= William Elder =

William Elder may refer to:

- William Elder (engraver) (fl. 1680–1700), Scottish engraver
- William Elder (Canadian politician) (1822–1883), Presbyterian clergyman, journalist and political figure in New Brunswick
- William Henry Elder (1819–1904), American archbishop
- William Wiles Elder (c. 1885 – 1960), American college football player and coach
- William Hanna Elder (1913–2006), American zoologist
- Will Elder (1921–2008), American illustrator and comic book artist
- Bill Elder (newscaster) (1938–2003), American news anchor and investigative reporter
