= Jack Elder =

Jack Elder may refer to:

- Jack Elder (politician) (born 1949), New Zealand former politician
- Jack Elder (umpire) (1885–1944), Australian rules football umpire
- Jack Elder (luger) (born 1941), American Olympic luger

== See also ==
- John Elder (disambiguation)
