= Joseph Nutting =

English engraver (1660–1722)

Joseph Nutting (1660–1722) was an English engraver, working in London. He is known for his portraits, often used as book frontispieces.

== Works ==
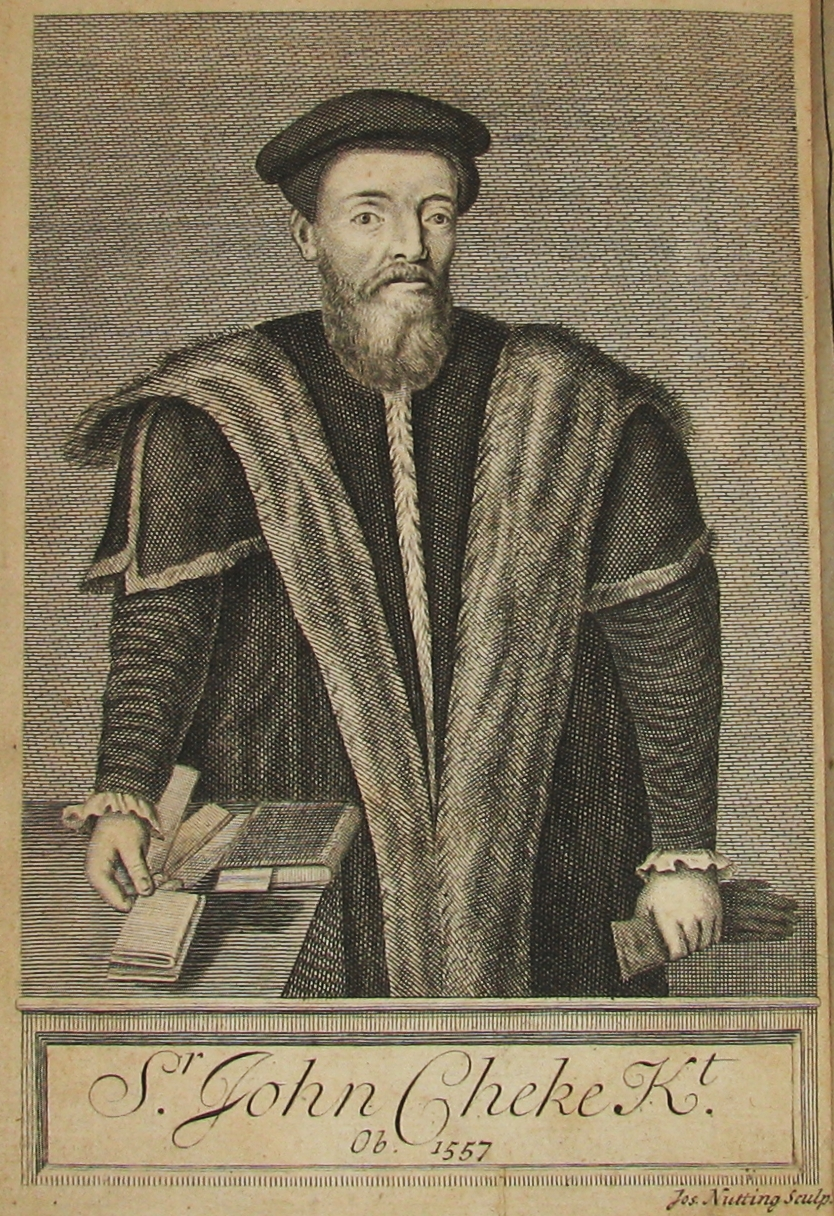
Engraving of Sir John Cheke.

He was apprenticed to John Savage.

Nutting's style resembled that of Robert White. His subjects included Mary Capell, Duchess of Beaufort, after Robert Walker; Sir Edmund Berry Godfrey; John Locke, after Sylvester Brownover; Thomas Greenhill, after Thomas Murray, prefixed to his Art of Embalming, 1705; Aaron Hill the poet, 1705; Sir Bartholomew Shower; Sir John Cheke; James Bonnell; the Rev. Matthew Mead; William Elder, the engraver; and the family of Rawlinson of Cark, five ovals on one plate.

Around 1690, Nutting engraved A New Prospect of the North Side of the City of London, with New Bedlam and Moore Fields, a large work on three sheets, and some other topographical plates.
