= Stefan Herbrechter =

British literary critic

Stefan Herbrechter is a freelance writer, academic, researcher and translator. He is best known for his work on [critical posthumanism. Until 2014, he was Reader in Cultural Theory and Director of Postgraduate Studies (Media) at Coventry University. In 2015, he was a Senior Fellow at the IKKM in Weimar. Currently, he is a Privatdozent at Heidelberg University.

He is the author and editor of a number of volumes, articles and contributions on literature, critical and cultural theory and cultural studies. He is general editor of the book series Critical Posthumanisms and one of the co-directors of the Critical Posthumanism Network and its online database/journal Genealogy of the Posthuman.

== Publications ==
- Posthumanismus – Eine kritische Einführung (Wissenschaftliche Buchgesellschaft, 2009)
- Posthumanism – A Critical Analysis (Bloomsbury, 2013)
- Palgrave Handbook of Critical Posthumanism (Springer, 2023)
- Before Humanity Posthumanism and Ancestrality (Brill, 2023)
- (Un)Learning to Be Human? Collected Essays on Critical Posthumanism 1 (Brill, 2024)
- Solidarities with the Non/Human, or, Posthumanism in Literature Collected Essays on Critical Posthumanism 2 (Brill, 2025)
