= Suzanne Elder =

Chicago community activist

Suzanne Elder (née Lagershausen) is a Chicago community activist and public health leader who has worked on school, health care, and community issues. Elder is also noted for her candidacy in the 2008 Democratic primary where she challenged the party's practice of preselection in lieu of election.

== Education and activism ==
Elder earned a master's degree in Public Policy from the University of Chicago, where she was appointed Health Policy Analyst for the Institute of Policy Research at the Harris School of Public Policy Studies and co-authored a study on the impact of state Medicaid rules on access to abortion.

A community organizer in Uptown, who once worked with the Organization of the North East ("O.N.E."), Elder's activism took a personal turn in 2006 when her young daughter was diagnosed with Type 1 diabetes. Forced to quit her job to provide the basic care her daughter needed to stay in school, she soon recognized that there were thousands of families like hers struggling with a demanding diagnosis and non-compliant school districts.

While attending second grade with her daughter, Elder built a statewide network of more than 3,000 affected families, and negotiated more than 200 Section 504 plans for families in crisis. She drafted legislation and secured support from key legislators including House Minority leader Rep. Tom Cross, the bill's chief sponsor. Elder also partnered with Chicago-Kent law school to provide affected families pro-bono legal services The Care of Students with Diabetes Act (105 ILCS 145/1) became law in 2010. The legislation has since served as a model for other states.

After passage of the Act, Elder resumed her work in public health, focusing on health policy and programming and contributing to a number of committees, including the Governor's task force on student health where she developed recommendations to decrease regulatory obstacles to implementing evidence-based health care practice and ensure students receive life-saving medication in the event of an emergency. Elder has been instrumental in developing other important state and local health policies, health programs, and health promotion campaigns. and works to raise awareness about chronic diseases and its impact on children and their families.

== Political candidate ==
In November 2007, Elder announced her candidacy for the Illinois State Senate vacated seat of Carol Ronen. This north side district has a notorious reputation for pre-selecting its office holders rather than electing them and Ronen's resignation was timed to keep the tradition alive. With just 7 days left to collect signatures, the Elder campaign collected and filed its nominating petitions, forcing the first contested primary in the district in nearly than forty years. Faced with an unexpected primary race, Ronen was forced to re-resign, changing the effective date of her resignation from January 2008 to after the primary election on February 5, 2008. Ronen went on to take a short but lucrative appointment with former Governor Rod Blagojevich but resigned for a third time after a brief 8-week appointment that increased Ronen's lifetime pension benefits by more than $1 million.

Elder's campaign confronted pension spiking ploys by elected officials, pay-to-play politics, the abuse of tax increment financing (TIF) districts, and urged reform of Illinois tax structure. The pro-choice and pro-gay marriage stances of the Elder campaign also highlighted the differences between civil unions and marriage and attracted substantial attention in the LGBT community. Elder was endorsed by the Northside Chicago chapter of Democracy for America, an organization initially formed by former Howard Dean supporters which encourages grassroots Democrats to run for local, state, and federal office., the Independent Voters of Illinois-Independent Precinct Organization (IVI-IPO), National Organization for Women PAC, Americans for Democratic Action, the Illinois Coalition for Honest Government, but had little support from any current or past elected officials. Elder lost the February 5, 2008, primary to Heather Steans, a philanthropist, fundraiser, and political contributor who heavily supported Governor Blagojevich and had the support of most Democratic politicians and both daily Chicago newspapers. Elder was outspent 20:1, yet took more than 35 percent of the vote.

Elder and Steans later joined forces to pass anti-discrimination legislation. They faced formidable opposition from the state's powerful teachers' unions and others to secure the support needed to pass the Care of Students with Diabetes Act (P.A. 96–1485) and override Governor Quinn's amendatory veto.
