= Alison Elder =

English cricketer

Personal information
- Full name: Alison Elder
- Role: Batter, occasional wicket-keeper

International information
- National side: England (1990)
- ODI debut (cap 57): 18 July 1990 v Netherlands
- Last ODI: 17 August 1990 v Ireland

Domestic team information
- Years: Team
- 1984–1988: East Anglia
- 1989–2000: Yorkshire

Career statistics
Competition	WODI	WFC	WLA
Matches	4	2	64
Runs scored	43	74	1,407
Batting average	–	18.50	29.93
100s/50s	0/0	0/0	1/7
Top score	37*	30	134
Balls bowled	–	–	324
Wickets	–	–	6
Bowling average	–	–	42.66
5 wickets in innings	–	–	0
10 wickets in match	–	–	–
Best bowling	–	–	2/25
Catches/stumpings	6/0	1/0	25/4
- Source: CricketArchive, 11 March 2021

Alison Elder is an English former cricketer who played as a batter and occasional wicket-keeper. She appeared in four One Day Internationals for England in 1990, making her debut against The Netherlands. In total she scored 43 runs, with a best of 37 not out, and took six catches. She played domestic cricket for East Anglia and Yorkshire.
