= Charles Elder =

English painter

Charles Elder (1821 – 11 December 1851) was an English historical and portrait painter. He died aged 30, at Gower Street, London, leaving a widow and three children.

== Works ==
He first exhibited at the British Institution in 1844, to which he sent Noli me tangere, and at the Royal Academy in 1845, sending Sappho. He was a frequent contributor to exhibitions, among his works being Florimel (Royal Academy, 1846), The Death of Mark Antony (Royal Academy, 1847), Rosalind (Royal Academy, 1850), Jael (British Institution, 1850). Two of his pictures were exhibited at the Royal Academy in 1852: On the Thames near Twickenham and An Italian Fruit Girl. Among the portraits painted by him were those of the Marquess of Bristol and Mr. Sheriff Nicol.
