= Lauren Elder (born 1990) =

American artist

Lauren Elder is an American artist, born in 1990.

== Life and career ==
Lauren Elder was born in 1990 in Los Angeles.

Her works include mostly sculptures, that mean to explore "the transformation of symbolic behaviour through mass production and the resulting loss of information. Her aim is to recreate the commercial promise of the "all-in-one" consumer object through the use of failure in construction and functionality."

Her work has been exhibited at Steve Turner Contemporary, LA, at UMOCA, Salt Lake City, at Robert Bills Contemporary, Chicago, at MOMA PS1, New York, at Oliver Francis Gallery, Dallas, at Courtney Blades, Chicago, at Church Porch Gallery, Chicago, at Library Plus, London, at Arti et Amicitiae, Netherlands at West Lane South, London, and at Rod Barton, London.

According to Artsy, "Elder joins a cohort of young, L.A.-based new media artists—including Petra Cortright and Amalia Ulman—who are challenging how art and identity are developed in the technological age". For Dazed, with Elder "digi pop art gets anthropological". She is a member of the collective Miami Dutch, also known as No-New Info.

Elder lives and works in Chicago and LA.
