= Christopher Glazek =

American journalist

Christopher Glazek (born 1985) is an American journalist, critic, and the founder of the Yale AIDS Memorial Project. His writing surveys a breadth of contemporary American politics, law, culture, and social issues. He has written for n+1, The New Yorker, The London Review of Books, Esquire, The New York Times, and Artforum, among others.

On October 16, 2017, Glazek was the first to publicly report that the Sackler family had significantly profited from selling the opioid OxyContin while fully aware that the highly addictive drug was directly fueling the opioid epidemic in America.

== Early life and education ==
Glazek grew up in suburban Detroit, Michigan. He graduated from Yale University in 2007 and University of Cambridge in 2008.

== Work ==
=== Yale Aids Memorial Project ===
While working as an editor at n+1, Glazek proposed the idea of commemorating and archiving gay and bisexual men and women from his alma mater who lost their lives due to the AIDS crisis. The project, known as the Yale AIDS Memorial Project and one of the first of its kind for universities, includes an online archival journal with anecdotal profiles and photographs of Yale alumni, such as the author Paul Monette and scholar like Jack Winkler, as well as university news and essays. Historian George Chauncey (class of 1977), a Yale professor of history, and Pulitzer Prize winner Mark Schoofs (class of 1985), sit on the board. The online platform became a model for various universities and institutions to memorialize those who have lost their lives as a direct result from the AIDS crisis.

=== Research and Writing ===
==== Politics, Pharmaceuticals, and Law ====
Glazek's reporting on mass incarceration and crime rates in 2012's Raise the Crime Rate, argues for abolishing prisons and releasing prisoners. This would amount to a deregulation of criminal punishment and let the private sector determine how best to prevent crimes, such as digital surveillance or security guards. Citing the enormous number of unrecorded crimes that take place in the country's prison system, the $200+ billion annual bill to pay for correctional facilities, and the various forms of racism that disadvantage people of color (such as the harrowing effects and media spectacle of the crack epidemic, recidivism, and strict gun and drug control laws that help fuel a black market), the prison-industrial-complex is a reinforcing site of corruption. Glazek posits that defunding correctional facilities is a bipartisan issue.

Certainty of Hopelessness, a joint project by Glazek, Sean Monahan, and Paper Chase Press, was a pamphlet offered as A Primer on Discharging Student Debt. The user's manual addresses each of the Ninth Circuit's criteria for evaluating claims of hopelessness or undue hardship. Glazek argues that debt is “deliberately shameless, and encourages debtors to ‘think strategically’ — and often, to lie — by adopting the kind of adversarial approach to their own financial situation that we often reserve for the rich and powerful.” An accompanying article published in 2012, Death By Degrees, examines the pitfalls of creditialism and the growing student debt crisis in America, noting that in the United States, student debt now exceeds $1 trillion. Debt-financed accreditation functions as a tax on the poor, just like cigarette duties or state lotteries.

Glazek reported on the under-prescribing and potential mass appeal for the HIV-preventative drug Truvada, which can be used as a pre-exposure prophylaxis. Produced by Gilead Sciences in 2004, Truvada is a primary treatment for people already living with AIDS when used with other antiretrovirals. Early critics from the medical community were concerned about the efficacy and cost of the drug and accused the United States government of colluding with Gilead at the expense of public health. For GQ's Voices of 2015, Glazek interviewed David Moore and David Ermold, the Kentucky couple that county clerk Kim Davis refused to wed. In 2017, Glazek wrote The C.E.O. of H.I.V. a piece that detailed the controversy surrounding Michael Weinstein's AIDS Healthcare Foundation. Weinstein has been met with scorn by health care advocates and the LGBTQ community for his moral conservatism as he opposes PrEP, the H.I.V.-prevention pill, which he believes will cause a “public-health catastrophe” by triggering a dangerous increase in risky sex and has campaigned to make condoms mandatory in adult films.

In 2018, Glazek wrote and narrated a script titled, Obama Baroque and UBI: The Straight Truvada, as part of a trilogy of videos by DIS reflecting on the financial crisis and universal basic income.

==== Art and Literary Criticism ====
While an editor at n+1, Glazek and Elizabeth Gumport teamed up with authors including Helen DeWitt and Chris Kraus to lead discussions groups for emerging writers and artists living in New York, Los Angeles, and Berlin.

For the London Review of Books in 2012, Glazek reviewed Jack Holmes and His Friend by Edmund White noting its dreary masculine and conventional modernist approach to the novel, one that follows a fey and brittle narrative of yet another closeted gay man. Glazek notes that in virtually every other artistic field, whether dance, music, painting, drama or, indeed, poetry, homosexuals continued to flourish in the late 20th century, however, under the genre of the novel, homosexual storytelling declined.

In 2017, Glazek wrote the introduction to Gary Indiana's reissued Three Month Fever, a 1999 true-crime novel following the Andrew Cunanan murders. The essay, Cunanan/Bovary, introduces the concept of “deflationary realism,” a style of writing distinct from the so-called hysterical realism posited by literary critic James Wood. Wood cites writers like David Foster Wallace and Zadie Smith, whose imaginations are laced with sentimentality and unconvincing scenarios, as hysterical realists. Deflationary realism is marked for its “absurdist bleakness” and “alienating nihilism” as evinced in contemporary writers like Dennis Cooper, Rachel Cusk, David Foster Wallace, and Jackie Ess. Deflationary realism leaves little room for modernist themes and motifs such as the traumatic, the tragic, the romantic, or the revolutionary.

In addition to literary criticism, Glazek has written on various artists and cultural groups and figures, including DIS, Jeremy O. Harris, Madonna, Ryan Trecartin and Lizzie Fitch, Hood By Air, Lana Del Rey, and Nan Goldin.
