= Bruce Elder =

Bruce Elder may refer to:

- Bruce Elder (journalist), Australian journalist, writer and commentator
- Bruce Elder (basketball), basketball player
- R. Bruce Elder (born 1947), Canadian filmmaker and critic
