= Toby Elder =

Australian rules footballer

Personal information
- Full name: Daniel Noel Elder
- Born: 17 October 1934
- Died: 2 April 2005 (aged 70); Ballarat, Victoria
- Original team: Wycheproof
- Height: 178 cm (5 ft 10 in)
- Weight: 80 kg (176 lb)

Playing career^{1}
Years	Club	Games (Goals)
1955	Fitzroy	5 (1)
- ^{1} Playing statistics correct to the end of 1955.

Daniel Noel "Toby" Elder (17 October 1934 – 2 April 2005) was an Australian rules footballer who played with Fitzroy in the Victorian Football League (VFL).
