= Matt Cain (writer) =

British writer and broadcaster (born 1974)

Matt Cain MBE
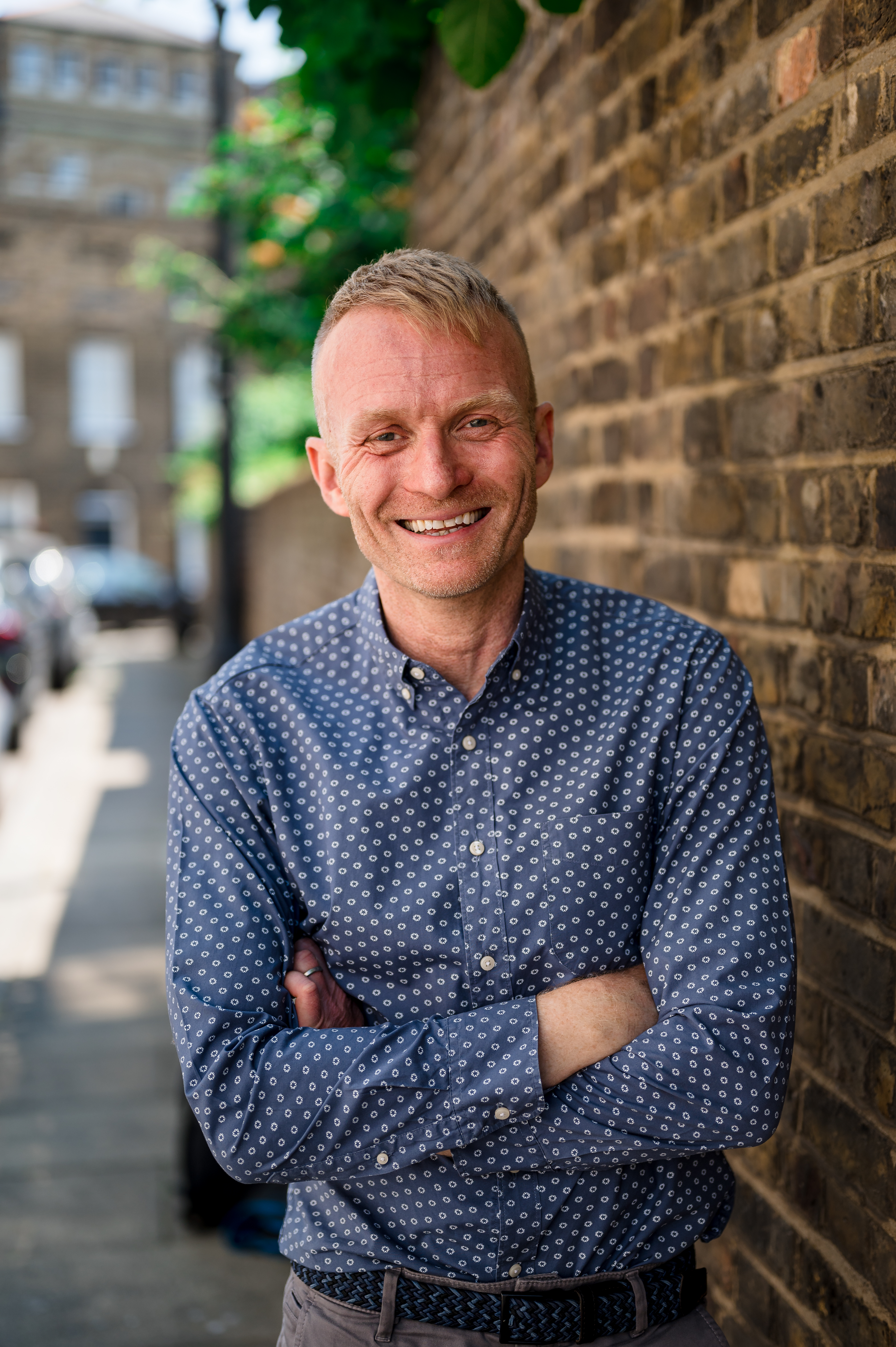
- Cain in 2023
- Born: 27 December 1974 (age 51); Bury Greater Manchester, England
- Occupations: Novelist, journalist and broadcaster, publisher
- Writing career
- Notable works: The Madonna of Bolton, The Secret Life of Albert Entwistle, One Love and The Castle of Stories

Matthew Joseph Cain (born 27 December 1974) is a British writer, broadcaster and publisher. He is best known for the novels The Madonna of Bolton, The Secret Life of Albert Entwistle, One Love and The Castle of Stories. In the New Year's Honours List 2025 Cain was appointed a Member of the Order of the British Empire (MBE) for services to LGBTQ+ culture.

== Career ==
Cain was born in Bury, Greater Manchester, England, and brought up in nearby Bolton. He was educated at state schools and then Queens' College Cambridge University.

Cain spent ten years making arts and entertainment programmes for ITV, including documentaries about Freddie Mercury, Mamma Mia! and The Da Vinci Code, and profiles of Ian McKellen, Darcey Bussell and Will Young for The South Bank Show.

Between 2010 and 2013, Cain worked in front of the camera as Channel 4 News' first-ever culture editor, a role in which he attracted acclaim for his coverage of the Women's Prize for Fiction, the Mercury Music Prize and the Turner Prize, as well as interviews with Grayson Perry, the Spice Girls and Pedro Almodóvar.

Cain's first novel, Shot Through the Heart (ISBN 978-1447238294), was published by Pan Macmillan in 2014. The second, Nothing But Trouble, (ISBN 978-1447238300) was published in 2015.

Between 2016 and 2018 Cain worked as editor-in-chief of Attitude, a UK magazine for gay men. Whilst in the role he negotiated world-exclusive covers with Sam Smith, Ricky Martin and James Corden, launched and hosted the #AttitudeHeroes podcast, and ran the Attitude Awards, hosted by Tom Daley, with winners including Prince Harry and Kylie Minogue. He also wrote exclusive reports on his personal experience of HIV/AIDS prevention drug PrEP, homophobia in Russia, and life for gay people in China.

As a freelance journalist, Cain has written articles for all the UK's major newspapers and appeared on Sky News, BBC Breakfast and Good Morning Britain. He was a judge for the 2013 Costa Book Awards, and the Polari First Novel Prize 2014 and continues to judge the South Bank Sky Arts Awards. He has been nominated for Stonewall's Writer of the Year award and in September 2017 was voted winner of Diversity in Media's Journalist of the Year award.

In October 2017 Cain crowdfunded his third novel The Madonna of Bolton (ISBN 978-1783526185) via Unbound, after receiving over 30 rejections from publishers, reportedly due to its gay protagonist and theme. The title reached its funding target in seven days, becoming Unbound's fastest-crowdfunded novel. Pledges came in from 28 countries and the project was backed by celebrities including David Walliams, Mark Gatiss, Gok Wan, S. J. Watson, Lisa Jewell and Arlene Phillips. The Madonna of Bolton was published by Unbound in July 2018.

Cain has been an ambassador for both Manchester Pride and the Albert Kennedy Trust, a national youth LGBT+ homelessness charity. He's also a patron of LGBT History Month. In 2021 he was awarded an honorary doctorate from the University of Bolton.

His novel The Secret Life of Albert Entwistle (ISBN 978-1472275059) was published by Headline Review in May 2021. In 2021 he presented the flagship discussion show Sunday Roast on Virgin Radio Pride, returned to the station in 2022 to present Matt Cain Meets, and again in 2023 with his husband to present Matt & Harry.

Becoming Ted (ISBN 978-1472291875), was published by Headline Review in January 2023. One Love was published in January 2024. His short novel Game On (ISBN 978-1035409730) was published as a Quick Read and is one of the official titles of World Book Night 2024. His latest, The Castle of Stories (ISBN 978-1-9194439-0-4), was published in June 2026 as the first title from Pansy, the independent publisher he's set up with Harry Glasstone specialising in queer books by queer authors for all readers.

In the New Year's Honours List 2025 Cain was appointed a Member of the Order of the British Empire (MBE) for services to LGBTQ+ culture.

Cain announced in November 2026 that he is publishing his first historical novel under the name Matthew Cain. William: I Am Not What I Am (ISBN 978-1-919443959) is the first in a trilogy of novels that re-imagines the life of William Shakespeare as a queer man, inspired by the love story he tells in the sonnets. It will be published on 23 April 2027.

Cain lives in London with his husband, Harry, and their dog, Teddy.

== Personal life ==
In 2025, Cain announced in an article published in The Guardian that he had been diagnosed with autism and attention deficit hyperactivity disorder in the previous year.

== Publications ==
- Shot Through the Heart
- Nothing But Trouble
- The Madonna of Bolton
- The Secret Life of Albert Entwistle
- Becoming Ted
- One Love
- Game On – a QUICK READ
- The Castle of Stories
