= John Elder =

John Elder may refer to:

- John Elder (pastor) (1706–1792), the "Fighting Pastor", founder of the Paxton Boys of Pennsylvania
- John Elder (cricketer) (born 1949), Irish cricketer
- John Elder (writer) (fl. 1542 – 1565), Scottish cartographer and writer
- John Elder (shipbuilder) (1824–1869), Scottish marine engineer and shipbuilder
- John Elder (politician), farmer and political figure in Nova Scotia
- John Elder (footballer) (1932–2018), Australian rules footballer
- Anthony Hinds (born 1922), British screenwriter and producer who used John Elder as a pseudonym

== See also ==
- John Elder Professor of Naval Architecture and Ocean Engineering, at the University of Glasgow
- Jack Elder (disambiguation), several people
- John the Elder
- John Elder Robison (born 1956), author of the 2007 memoir Look Me in the Eye,
