= Ern Elder =

Australian rules footballer

Personal information
- Full name: Ernest Stanley Elder
- Born: 13 December 1916; Hawthorn, Victoria
- Died: 4 December 2007 (aged 90)
- Height: 187 cm (6 ft 2 in)
- Weight: 81 kg (179 lb)

Playing career^{1}
Years	Club	Games (Goals)
1940–1941	Hawthorn	12 (0)
- ^{1} Playing statistics correct to the end of 1941.

Ernest Stanley Elder (13 December 1916 – 4 December 2007) was an Australian rules footballer who played with Hawthorn in the Victorian Football League (VFL).
