= Dave Elder =

Dave Elder may refer to:

- Dave Elder (umpire) (1865–1954), cricket umpire
- Dave Elder (baseball) (1975–2023), American Major League Baseball player
- Dave Elder (politician) (born 1942), American politician in the state of California
