= Robert Elder =

Robert Elder may refer to:

- Robert A. Elder (1918–1994), U.S. Air Force colonel, WWII flying ace
- Robert J. Elder Jr. (born 1952), U.S. Air Force general
- Robert K. Elder (born 1976), American journalist, author and film columnist
- Rob Elder (born 1981), archer from Fiji
- Robert Elder (minister) (1808–1892), Moderator of the General Assembly of the Free Church of Scotland 1871/72
- Robert Lee Elder (1934–2021), American golfer
