= George Elder =

George Elder may refer to:

- George Elder (educator) (1793–1838), pioneer Roman Catholic educator
- George Elder (British Army officer) (died 1837), British Army officer who fought in the Napoleonic Wars
- George Elder (baseball) (1921–2022), American professional baseball outfielder
- George Elder Davie (1912–2007), Scottish philosopher
- SS George W. Elder (1874–1935), a passenger/cargo ship
