= George Eld (antiquary) =

British politician

George Eld (1791–1862), was an English antiquary.

== Life ==
Eld was born in Coventry in 1791. He carried on business successively as a miller, a silk dealer, and a dyer; he was also for twenty years editor of the Coventry Standard.

He was the last mayor of Coventry (1834–5) before the passing of the Municipal Reform Act, and, besides filling other public offices, an alderman of the reformed corporation till his death. During his mayoralty he restored the interior of the mayoresses' parlour – an architectural relic of the fourteenth century – and throughout his life he preserved local antiquities. He drew old buildings and other memorials of the past. He died at Coventry on 22 May 1862, in his seventy-first year.
