= Linda Elder =

American educational psychologist, author

- Born: March 18, 1962 (age 64)
- Education: University of Memphis
- Occupations: Psychologist; author

Linda Elder is an American educational psychologist, author and president of the Foundation for Critical Thinking. She is currently an executive director of the Center for Critical Thinking. Elder is best known for her work on critical thinking development and thoughts including SEE-I.

== Early life and career ==
Elder started her career for a non-profit organization, Youth Services in 1983 to deal with youth for juvenile detention. She completed her master's degree in psychology in 1988 and her PhD in 1992 from the University of Memphis. Elder started her academic career at the college level, where she served as a Professor and got introduced to the critical thinking initially. She subsequently started studying critical thinking, primarily to teach the subject at a deeper level to the students.

In 1992, she was introduced to the work of Richard Paul and the Foundation for Critical Thinking, located in California. Elder joined the Center and Foundation for Critical Thinking in 1994, focused primarily on the relationship between cognition and affect. Later in the same year, she developed an original stage theory of critical thinking development, which was later expanded along with Richard Paul in 1995. She has written, with coauthor Richard Paul, 23 thinker's guides to critical thinking and four books, which provided her the early success. Later in 1997, she was the primary researcher for the California Teacher Preparation for Instruction in Critical Thinking: Research Findings and Policy Recommendations. The Journal of Developmental Education offered her a quarterly column on critical thinking, where she writes regularly.

== Research topics ==
Elder's work has focused primary on the barriers to critical thinking development, closely to egocentric and sociocentric thought. She had explained ethnocentricity as a form of sociocentricity, since, on her view, sociocentrism refers to all forms of group pathologies in thought, and therefore goes beyond those pathologies that arise out of ethnicity. Her work has been influenced by the writings of Peter Singer, Jane Goodall, and Roger Fouts. Elder has focused on the conceptual relationship between cognition and affect, thinking, feeling and motivation and has challenged common factors for the relationships between reason and emotion.

== Bibliography ==
Elder has written books mostly on Critical Thinking with co-author Richard Paul.

- Linda Elder; Richard Paul (2008). Defining Critical Thinking. Foundation for Critical Thinking Press. Archived from the original on 2015-04-19.
- The Aspiring Thinker's Guide to Critical Thinking. Foundation Critical Thinking. 2009. ISBN 978-0944583418.
- Linda Elder; Richard Paul (2009). The Thinker's Guide: A Glossary of Critical Thinking Terms and Concepts. Foundation for Critical Thinking. ISBN 978-0944583418.
- Linda Elder; Richard Paul (2007). The Thinker's Guide to Analytic Thinking. Foundation Critical Thinking. ISBN 978-0944583197.
- Linda Elder; Richard Paul (2008). The Thinker's Guide to Intellectual Standards. ISBN 978-0944583395.
- Linda Elder; Richard Paul (2004). The Miniature Guide to the Human Mind.
- Linda Elder (2005). The Miniature Guide to Critical Thinking for Children. ISBN 0944583296.
- Richard Paul; Linda Elder (2005). The International Critical Thinking Reading & Writing Test. ISBN 0944583210.
- Richard Paul; Linda Elder (2001). The Miniature Guide to Critical Thinking: Concepts & Tools. ISBN 0944583105.
- Richard Paul; Linda Elder (2006). The Thinker's Guide to Understanding the Foundations of Ethical Reasoning. ISBN 0944583172.

critical thinking therapy: for happiness and self-actualization , pub. jan 2, 2025

- Richard Paul; Linda Elder (2006). 25 Days to Better Thinking & Better Living: A Guide for Improving Every Aspect of Your Life. Prentice Hall Professional. ISBN 0131738593.
- Richard Paul; Linda Elder (2011). The Miniature Guide to Taking Charge of the Human Mind: Thinking, Feeling, Wanting. ISBN 978-0944583142.
- Richard Paul; Linda Elder (2014). How to Improve Student Learning: 30 Practical Ideas. ISBN 978-0944583555.
- Richard Paul; Linda Elder (2006). The Thinker's Guide to how to Write a Paragraph. ISBN 0944583229.
- Richard Paul; Linda Elder (2005). A Guide for Educators to Critical Thinking Competency Standards: Standards, Principles, Performance Indicators, and Outcomes with a Critical Thinking Master Rubric. ISBN 094458330X.
- Richard Paul; Linda Elder (2001). How to Study and Learn a Discipline. ISBN 0944583113.
- Richard Paul; Linda Elder (2007). A Critical Thinker's Guide to Educational Fads: How to Get Beyond Educational Glitz and Glitter. ISBN 978-0944583340.
- Judy Chartrand; Stewart Emery; Russ Hall; Heather Ishikawa; John Maketa; Richard Paul; Linda Elder; Robert E. Gunther (2011). Critical Thinking Strategies for Success. ISBN 978-0132938556.
- Meg Gorzycki; Linda Elder; Richard Paul (2013). Historical Thinking: Bringing Critical Thinking Explicitly Into the Heart of Historical Study. ISBN 978-0944583487.
- Linda Elder; Richard Paul (2008). The Thinker's Guide to Intellectual Standards: The Words that Name Them and the Criteria that Define Them. ISBN 978-0944583395.
- Richard Paul; Robert Niewoehner; Linda Elder (2006). The Thinker's Guide to Engineering Reasoning. ISBN 0944583334.
- Richard Paul; Linda Elder (2013). Critical Thinking: Tools for Taking Charge of Your Professional and Personal Life. ISBN 978-0133115697.
- Linda Elder (2012). Student Guide to Historical Thinking. ISBN 978-0944583463.
- Linda Elder; Richard Paul (2009). Critical Thinking Terms and Concepts. ISBN 978-0944583401.
- Linda Elder; Richard Paul (2004). How to Detect Media Bias and Propaganda. ISBN 0944583156.
