= Robert Goss =

American theologian and author

Robert E. Shore-Goss is an American theologian and author.

Goss was brought up in a devout Roman Catholic family and felt called to the priesthood, being ordained as a Jesuit in 1976. He left the Jesuits in 1978 going on to receive a Th.D. in Comparative Religion from Harvard University.

Goss taught in the Religious Studies Department of Webster University (1994–2004), and served as chair of the department. His denial of tenure by the university was controversial with allegations by Goss that this was due to his outspoken views on sexuality. Webster Pride, the student organization for gay, lesbian, bisexual and transgender rights, did not take an official stance. Webster Pride's president was quoted in the student newspaper as not opposed to the decision "because she doesn't believe the decision had anything to do with homophobia."

He has been involved in gay organizations such as ACT UP, Queer Nation, and the gay Roman Catholic group DignityUSA. Goss has served as co-chair of the Gay Men's Issues in Religion Group of the American Academy of Religion. He serves on the National Advisory Board of the Center for Lesbian and Gay Studies in Religion and Ministry of the Pacific School of Religion. He married for the second time in 2009.

== Works ==
His published works include:

- Jesus ACTED UP: A Gay and Lesbian Manifesto 1993, San Francisco, CA: HarperCollins
- Take Back the Word: A Queer Reading of the Bible 2000 (co-edited with West, Mona), Cleveland, OH: Pilgrim Press
- Queering Christ: Beyond Jesus ACTED UP 2002, Cleveland, OH: Pilgrim Press
- Gay Catholic Priests and Clerical Sexual Misconduct: Breaking the Silence of Sodom 2005 (co-edited with Boisvert, Donald), New York, NY: Haworth Press
- The Queer Bible Commentary 2006 (co-edited with Bohache, Thomas; Guest, Deryn; West, Mona), London: SCM-Canterbury Press
- Queering Christianity: Finding a Place at the Table for LGBTQI Christians 2013 (co-edited with Bohache, Thomas; Cheng, Patrick S.; West, Mona), Santa Barbara, CA: ABC-CLIO

Shore-Goss is currently an adjunct faculty member at Claremont School of Theology.
