= Alistair Elder =

New Zealand footballer

Personal information
- Full name: Alistair G Elder
- Place of birth: New Zealand
- Position: Forward

Senior career*
Years	Team	Apps	(Gls)
- Manurewa

International career
1980	New Zealand	5	(3)
- * Club domestic league appearances and goals

Alistair Elder is a former association football player who represented New Zealand at international level.

Elder scored on his full All Whites debut in a 1–1 draw with Fiji on 2 February 1980 and ended his international playing career with five A-international caps and 3 goals to his credit, his final cap an appearance in a 6–1 win over Solomon Islands on 29 February 1980.
