= Norman Elder (botanist) =

Norman Lascelles Elder (born Wellington, New Zealand 6 April 1896 - died 10 August 1974) was a New Zealand electrical engineer, teacher, and botanist.
