= Janet Elder =

American journalist

- Born: July 6, 1956; Poughkeepsie, New York
- Died: December 20, 2017 (aged 61)
- Occupation(s): Writer, editor, reporter

Janet Elder was a writer, author, editor and reporter who worked for The New York Times for about three decades. She began working for the Times as a reporter in the mid-1980s, and eventually became one of their top editors. At her death in 2017, she was one of the highest ranking women at the Times. During her tenure, she wrote about several social issues, explained survey results, and edited for election analyses. She also conducted administrative work behind the scenes.

== Early life and education ==
Elder was born in Poughkeepsie, New York on July 6, 1956. She attended New York University where she received both a bachelor's degree and then a master's degree.

== Career ==
In 1975, Elder interviewed for a Times/CBS News poll, but didn't begin working for the Times as a reporter until the mid-1980s. She wrote a book after being diagnosed with cancer called Huck. She married Rich Pinsky in 1985 and they had a son. She died on December 20, 2017, at age 61 after developing cancer.
