= William Elder (engraver) =

Scottish engraver

William Elder (fl. 1680–1700), was a Scottish engraver who worked in London, where he was employed mainly by booksellers.

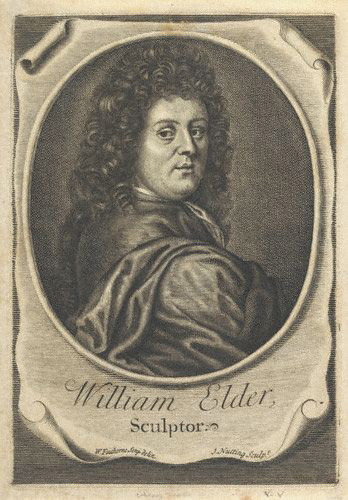
William Elder, engraving by Joseph Nutting, after William Faithorne.

== Works ==
He engraved many portraits as frontispieces, but was expert as an engraver of writing; his engraved portraits are mostly copied from older engravings. Among these were those of:

- Ben Jonson, prefixed to the folio edition of his works (1692) and copied from Vaughan's engraving in the first edition (1616);
- John Ray, from a drawing by William Faithorne, prefixed to his Wisdom of God manifested in the Creation (1701);
- Theodore de Mayerne;
- Dr. Richard Morton, from a picture by Orchard;
- Charles Snell, writing-master, from a picture by Hargrave;
- William Sancroft, John Pearson, the Earl of Oxford, and others.

He also engraved the plates in John Savage's edition of Richard Knolles and Paul Rycaut's History of the Turks (2 vols. London, 1701). He engraved his own portrait twice, once in a fur cap from a crayon drawing, and again in a wig.
