= Miriam Elder =

American journalist

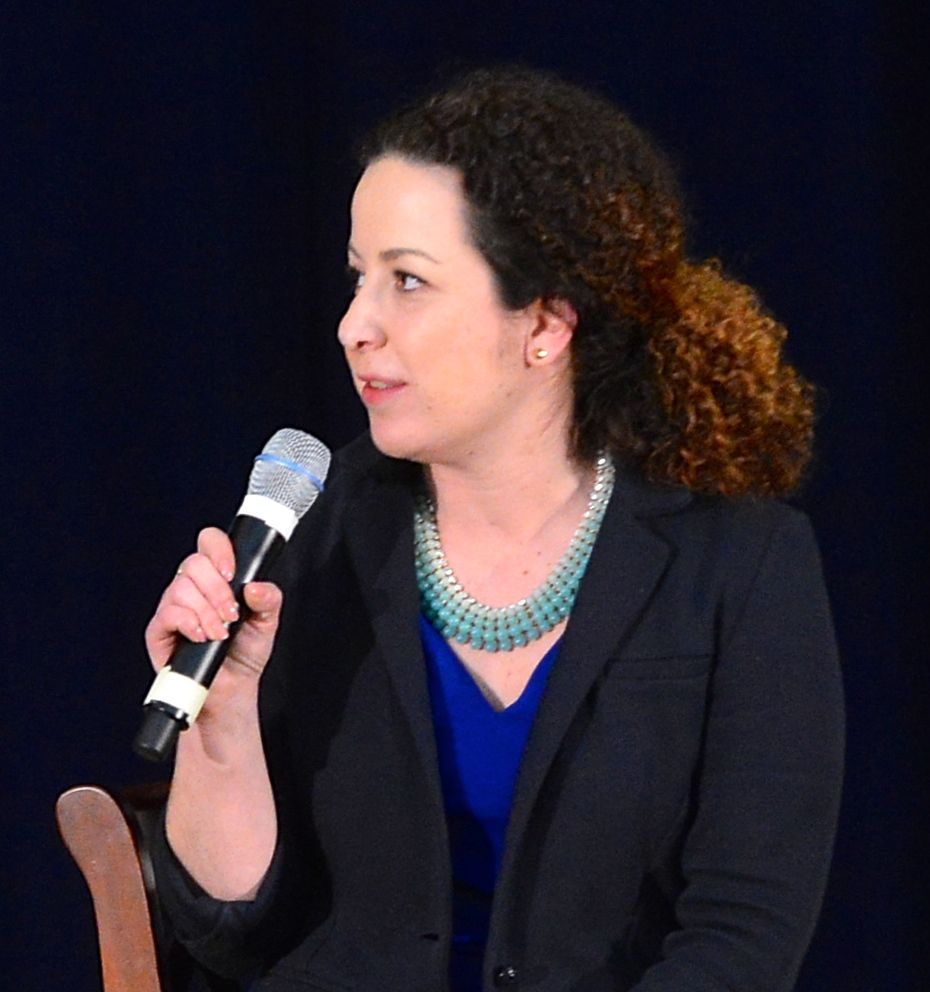
- Elder in 2014
- Occupation: Journalist

Miriam Elder is an American journalist who is foreign and national security editor for BuzzFeed News. She was formerly The Guardian's Moscow-based correspondent. Her writings have been published by the Financial Times, The Sunday Telegraph, The Atlantic, the International Herald Tribune and The Moscow Times.

== Biography ==
Elder is a native New Yorker. She is a graduate of Barnard College, and holds an MA in strategic studies and international economics from the School of Advanced International Studies at Johns Hopkins University.

She covered Russian news and affairs for Agence France Presse from 2002 to 2003, and worked for the International Herald Tribune in Paris, France, before moving to Moscow. She resided in Moscow from 2006 to 2013.

Elder was the first Western journalist to report on the Russian punk rock collective Pussy Riot. In April 2012, while The Guardian's Moscow correspondent, Elder wrote an article critical of what she described as the epitome of Russian bureaucracy, stemming from an incident in which she attempted to retrieve her dry-cleaning after losing her ticket. The article prompted a great laughter from Vladimir Putin's spokesman Dmitry Peskov, and Russians in general, who in a letter to The Guardian mocked Elder for her story and countered with a comparison to the bureaucratic difficulties Russians face when applying for British visas. Elder alleged his response was evidence of a return to Soviet-era whataboutism, and criticized Peskov for choosing to respond to a story on dry cleaning rather than the work she had done on corruption or the murder of Anna Politkovskaya.
