= A Certain Sacrifice =

1985 film by Stephen Jon Lewicki

- VHS front cover
- Directed by: Stephen Jon Lewicki
- Written by: Stephen Jon Lewicki; Jeremy Pattnosh; Robert Manganaro Morris
- Starring: Madonna; Jeremy Pattnosh; Charles Kurtz
- Narrated by: Chuck Varesko
- Cinematography: Stephen Jon Lewicki
- Edited by: Stephen Jon Lewicki; Robert Manganaro Morris
- Music by: Jeremy Pattnosh
- Production company: Cine Cine Productions
- Distributed by: Vidimax Home Entertainment; Virgin Video; Worldvision Home Video
- Release date: October 1, 1985
- Running time: 60 minutes
- Country: United States
- Language: English
- Budget: $20,000

A Certain Sacrifice is a 1985 American drama film co-written and directed by Stephen Jon Lewicki and starring Madonna, Jeremy Pattnosh and Charles Kurtz. It was Madonna's first movie, filmed from September 1979 through June 1981, but not released until 1985.

A Certain Sacrifice is an independent-underground art film, shot on-and-off over two years in New York City on a low-budget of just $20,000. Madonna finished her scenes in late 1980. The video release sold 50,000 copies in its first-week, and the film developed a certain cult status among some of Madonna's fans and collectors by that time.

== Plot ==
Madonna plays the part of Bruna, a Lower East Side resident who lives with three "love slaves" (one woman, one man, and one transgender woman). Bruna meets Dashiell (Pattnosh) in the water fountain in Washington Square Park and the two "fall in love". Bruna later tells her lovers she does not need them anymore, resulting in them attacking her sexually. Later, Bruna is raped by Raymond Hall (Kurtz) in a bathroom at a coffee shop. To exact retribution, Bruna enlists her love slaves and Dashiell to abduct the rapist. They dress up as prostitutes and lure him into a limousine. They lead him to a theatre where a Satanic sacrifice is performed. Dashiell later wipes Raymond's blood all over Bruna.

== Cast ==
- Jeremy Pattnosh as Dashiell
- Madonna as Bruna
- Charles Kurtz as Raymond Hall
- Kate Magill as Susan Porter
- Timmy Leight as The Landlady
- Michael Dane as Transvestite Slave
- Russell O. Lome as Male slave
- Angi Smit as Female slave
- Joseph Pattnosh as Father
- Ann Pattnosh as Mother
- John Joseph Pattnosh as Young David
- Chuck Varesko as Narrator

== Production and development ==
A Certain Sacrifice is a Super 8 film. It was made on a low-budget between $12,000 to $20,000. The film marks the acting debut of Madonna and the directorial debut of Stephen Jon Lewicki, an aspiring filmmaker. Various authors have regarded the movie as an underground art film.

Despite Madonna's second thoughts about having participated in this movie, Lewicki had nothing but compliments for her. One of his oft-repeated stories was how he "discovered" Madonna and was amazed that she hand-wrote a three-page letter for a part that did not even pay. She was only paid $100, only because she was short on her apartment rent and Lewicki paid to help out. In Christopher Andersen's 1991 biography, Madonna Unauthorized, Lewicki stated: "That woman has more sensuality in her ear than most women have anywhere on their bodies".

Actor Jeremy Pattnosh wrote and performed several songs in the film, including: "Certain Sacrifice" and "Screamin' Demon Lover". Years later, in a 2000 Channel 4 documentary on Madonna's early years (titled Madonna: Naked Ambition), her Breakfast Club bandmate Dan Gilroy recalled: "I did not like that fellow who made A Certain Sacrifice, I felt he was using them big-time [...] it needed a laugh-track, something".

== Release and reception ==
Madonna tried to buy the rights from director Stephen Jon Lewicki, offering him $5,000 which later upped to $10,000. Unsuccessful, she then attempted to ban the film from being seen. Stephen Lewicki invited her to view it; Madonna was reportedly unhappy with the result. According to Lewicki, she had an expression of horror on her face and screamed "Fuck you" as she stormed out of his apartment.

The release caused some controversy in the press at the time, due to film's sexually explicit and violent content, obtaining a R rating. Writing for The Wall Street Journal, Julie Salamon expressed: [...] Kind of a long MTV video with thinly developed themes of sadomasochism and ritual violence". Dennis Hunt from Los Angeles Times referred to the "tawdry drama", but saw Madonna an "adequate actress" who has several semi-nude scenes, further saying "she does her best acting in the scene following a rape". Editor Victor Lenore described the movie a "psychosexual fantasy, arty and cheap, that mixed thriller suspense, neogothic terror and softcore porn". Spartanburg Herald-Journal's Joe Saitzman said the film has a basic home movie quality, the sound unbelievably bad, and the script nonexistent. Despite most viewers labeling the film a failure, it also developed a certain cult status among Madonna's audiences and collectors at that time. The film was released in Italy in 1985. In 1986, there were theatrical midnight screenings in the U.S.

=== Home video ===
An exploitation film, A Certain Sacrifice was released on video in 1985 to capitalize on Madonna's fame. The retail price was $49.95. The video release sold more than 50,000 copies in its first-week. According to Billboard in 1985, Virgin Video, a joint venture of two independent distributors, had plans to distribute over one million copies of the home video by the end of 1985. Critics said that Madonna's appearance in the film was the only reason it sold well, while Mark Bego suggested that it was purchased by hard-core Madonna devotees only.

Shortly after the video release, Lewicki received significant criticism charging him with "exploiting" Madonna's image, to which he responded, "If people say that, I don't mind." He had previously commented, "I hope the videocassette makes lots of money". Biographer J. Randy Taraborrelli claims the film made Lewicki a "millionaire" in 1985. Lewicki subsequently argued that he deserved the resulting financial success, having taken a risk by casting an unknown Madonna and putting his own money into the movie. Saitzman said of the release, "It must be one of the most amateur, technically atrocious student films ever to be marketed," adding that Madonna needn't have worried about the film's release, since "even her most devoted fans won't be able to sit through" it.

== Book sources ==
- Bego, Mark (2000). Madonna: Blonde Ambition. Cooper Square Press. ISBN 0815410514.
- Braun, Eric (2007). Frightening the Horses: Gay Icons of the Cinema. Reynolds & Hearn. ISBN 978-1905287376.
- Crouse, Richard (2000). Big Bang, Baby: Rock Trivia. Dundurn Press. ISBN 0888822197.
- Guilbert, Georges-Claude (2015). Madonna as Postmodern Myth. McFarland & Company. ISBN 978-0786480715.
- Heatley, Michael (1996). The Virgin Encyclopedia of Rock: The World's Most Comprehensive Illustrated Rock Reference. Virgin Books. ISBN 1852276665.
- Koopmans, Andy (2003). Madonna. Lucent Books. ISBN 9781590181386.
- Martin, Mick; Porter, Marsha (1997). Video Movie Guide 1998. Ballantine Books. ISBN 0345407938.
- McCrossan, John Anthony (2000). Books and Reading in the Lives of Notable Americans: A Biographical Sourcebook. Greenwood Publishing Group. ISBN 0313303762.
- O'Brien, Lucy (2018). Madonna: Like an Icon. Random House. ISBN 978-1446437384.
