= Artists with the most number-ones on the Billboard Hot 100 =

The U.S. Billboard Hot 100 is a chart that ranks the best-performing songs of the United States. Published by Billboard magazine, the data are compiled by Nielsen SoundScan based collectively on each single's weekly physical and digital sales, airplay, and streaming. A new chart is compiled and officially released to the public every Tuesday in Billboard magazine and on its website. Each chart is dated with the "week-ending" date of the Saturday four days later.

This is a list of artists with the most number-ones on the Billboard Hot 100 chart. American singer Elvis Presley is notably absent from the list since ten of his seventeen number-ones charted before the launch of the Hot 100 in 1958. English band the Beatles currently holds the record for the most number-ones in the chart's history, with twenty. American singer-songwriter Mariah Carey holds the record for a solo artist with the most number-ones, with nineteen, ranking second overall. Canadian rapper Drake holds the record for a male solo artist with the most number-ones, with fourteen.

== Tally ==
Artists with the most number ones on the U.S. Billboard Hot 100
Amount	Image	Artist	List of number-ones	Source
20		The Beatles	List: 1. "I Want to Hold Your Hand"; 2. "She Loves You"; 3. "Can't Buy Me Love"; 4. "Love Me Do"; 5. "A Hard Day's Night"; 6. "I Feel Fine"; 7. "Eight Days a Week"; 8. "Ticket to Ride"; 9. "Help!"; 10. "Yesterday"; 11. "We Can Work It Out"; 12. "Paperback Writer"; 13. "Penny Lane"; 14. "All You Need Is Love"; 15. "Hello, Goodbye"; 16. "Hey Jude"; 17. "Get Back" (with Billy Preston); 18. "Come Together" / "Something"; 19. "Let It Be"; 20. "The Long and Winding Road" / "For You Blue"	
19		Mariah Carey	List: 1. "Vision of Love"; 2. "Love Takes Time"; 3. "Someday"; 4. "I Don't Wanna Cry"; 5. "Emotions"; 6. "I'll Be There"; 7. "Dreamlover"; 8. "Hero"; 9. "Fantasy"; 10. "One Sweet Day" (with Boyz II Men); 11. "Always Be My Baby"; 12. "Honey"; 13. "My All"; 14. "Heartbreaker" (featuring Jay-Z); 15. "Thank God I Found You" (featuring Joe and 98 Degrees); 16. "We Belong Together"; 17. "Don't Forget About Us"; 18. "Touch My Body"; 19. "All I Want for Christmas Is You"	
16		Taylor Swift	List: 1. "We Are Never Ever Getting Back Together"; 2. "Shake It Off"; 3. "Blank Space"; 4. "Bad Blood" (featuring Kendrick Lamar); 5. "Look What You Made Me Do"; 6. "Cardigan"; 7. "Willow"; 8. "All Too Well (Taylor's Version)"; 9. "Anti-Hero"; 10. "Cruel Summer"; 11. "Is It Over Now?"; 12. "Fortnight" (featuring Post Malone); 13. "The Fate of Ophelia"; 14. "Opalite"; 15. "I Knew It, I Knew You"; 16. "Patient Zero"	
14		Rihanna	List: 1. "SOS"; 2. "Umbrella" (featuring Jay-Z); 3. "Take a Bow"; 4. "Disturbia"; 5. "Live Your Life" (T.I. featuring Rihanna); 6. "Rude Boy"; 7. "Love the Way You Lie" (Eminem featuring Rihanna); 8. "What's My Name?" (featuring Drake); 9. "Only Girl (In the World)"; 10. "S&M" (with Britney Spears); 11. "We Found Love" (featuring Calvin Harris); 12. "Diamonds"; 13. "The Monster" (Eminem featuring Rihanna); 14. "Work" (featuring Drake)	
14 (Note: If counting Drake's uncredited feature on Travis Scott's "Sicko Mode", then he would have 15 total number-ones.)		Drake	List: 1. "What's My Name?" (Rihanna featuring Drake); 2. "Work" (Rihanna featuring Drake); 3. "One Dance" (featuring Wizkid and Kyla); 4. "God's Plan"; 5. "Nice for What"; 6. "In My Feelings"; 7. "Toosie Slide"; 8. "What's Next"; 9. "Way 2 Sexy" (featuring Future and Young Thug); 10. "Wait for U" (Future featuring Drake and Tems); 11. "Jimmy Cooks" (featuring 21 Savage); 12. "Slime You Out" (featuring SZA); 13. "First Person Shooter" (featuring J. Cole); 14. "Janice STFU"	
13		Michael Jackson	List: 1. "Ben"; 2. "Don't Stop 'Til You Get Enough"; 3. "Rock with You"; 4. "Billie Jean"; 5. "Beat It"; 6. "Say Say Say" (with Paul McCartney); 7. "I Just Can't Stop Loving You" (with Siedah Garrett); 8. "Bad"; 9. "The Way You Make Me Feel"; 10. "Man in the Mirror"; 11. "Dirty Diana"; 12. "Black or White"; 13. "You Are Not Alone"	
12		The Supremes	List: 1. "Where Did Our Love Go"; 2. "Baby Love"; 3. "Come See About Me"; 4. "Stop! In the Name of Love"; 5. "Back in My Arms Again"; 6. "I Hear a Symphony"; 7. "You Can't Hurry Love"; 8. "You Keep Me Hangin' On"; 9. "Love Is Here and Now You're Gone"; 10. "The Happening"; 11. "Love Child"; 12. "Someday We'll Be Together"	
12		Madonna	List: 1. "Like a Virgin"; 2. "Crazy for You"; 3. "Live to Tell"; 4. "Papa Don't Preach"; 5. "Open Your Heart"; 6. "Who's That Girl"; 7. "Like a Prayer"; 8. "Vogue"; 9. "Justify My Love"; 10. "This Used to Be My Playground"; 11. "Take a Bow"; 12. "Music"	
11		Whitney Houston	List: 1. "Saving All My Love for You"; 2. "How Will I Know"; 3. "Greatest Love of All"; 4. "I Wanna Dance with Somebody (Who Loves Me)"; 5. "Didn't We Almost Have It All"; 6. "So Emotional"; 7. "Where Do Broken Hearts Go"; 8. "I'm Your Baby Tonight"; 9. "All the Man That I Need"; 10. "I Will Always Love You"; 11. "Exhale (Shoop Shoop)"	
10		Stevie Wonder	List: 1. "Fingertips"; 2. "Superstition"; 3. "You Are the Sunshine of My Life"; 4. "You Haven't Done Nothin'"; 5. "I Wish"; 6. "Sir Duke"; 7. "Ebony and Ivory" (with Paul McCartney); 8. "I Just Called to Say I Love You"; 9. "Part-Time Lover"; 10. "That's What Friends Are For" (Dionne & Friends (Note: "That's What Friends Are For" was performed by singers Dionne Warwick, Elton John, Gladys Knight and Stevie Wonder, all of whom are also credited individually for the song on the Billboard charts.))	
10		Janet Jackson	List: 1. "When I Think of You"; 2. "Miss You Much"; 3. "Escapade"; 4. "Black Cat"; 5. "Love Will Never Do (Without You)"; 6. "That's the Way Love Goes"; 7. "Again"; 8. "Together Again"; 9. "Doesn't Really Matter"; 10. "All for You"	
10		Bruno Mars	List: 1. "Nothin' On You" (B.o.B. featuring Bruno Mars); 2. "Just the Way You Are"; 3. "Grenade"; 4. "Locked Out of Heaven"; 5. "When I Was Your Man"; 6. "Uptown Funk" (Mark Ronson featuring Bruno Mars); 7. "That's What I Like"; 8. "Leave the Door Open" (Silk Sonic [Bruno Mars and Anderson .Paak]); 9. "Die with a Smile" (with Lady Gaga); 10. "I Just Might"	
10		Ariana Grande	List: 1. "Thank U, Next"; 2. "7 Rings"; 3. "Stuck with U" (with Justin Bieber); 4. "Rain on Me" (with Lady Gaga); 5. "Positions"; 6. "Save Your Tears" (with the Weeknd); 7. "Die for You" (with the Weeknd); 8. "Yes, And?"; 9. "We Can't Be Friends (Wait for Your Love)"; 10. "Hate That I Made You Love Me"	
9		Bee Gees	List: 1. "How Can You Mend a Broken Heart"; 2. "Jive Talkin'"; 3. "You Should Be Dancing"; 4. "How Deep Is Your Love"; 5. "Stayin' Alive"; 6. "Night Fever"; 7. "Too Much Heaven"; 8. "Tragedy"; 9. "Love You Inside Out"	
9		Paul McCartney	List: 1. "Uncle Albert/Admiral Halsey" (with Linda McCartney); 2. "My Love" (with Wings); 3. "Band on the Run" (with Wings); 4. "Listen to What the Man Said" (with Wings); 5. "Silly Love Songs" (with Wings); 6. "With a Little Luck" (with Wings); 7. "Coming Up (Live at Glasgow)" (with Wings); 8. "Ebony and Ivory" (with Stevie Wonder); 9. "Say Say Say" (with Michael Jackson)	
9		Elton John	List: 1. "Crocodile Rock"; 2. "Bennie and the Jets"; 3. "Lucy in the Sky with Diamonds"; 4. "Philadelphia Freedom"; 5. "Island Girl"; 6. "Don't Go Breaking My Heart" (with Kiki Dee); 7. "That's What Friends Are For" (Dionne & Friends); 8. "Don't Let the Sun Go Down on Me" (with George Michael); 9. "Candle in the Wind 1997" / "Something About the Way You Look Tonight"	
9		Usher	List: 1. "Nice & Slow"; 2. "U Remind Me"; 3. "U Got It Bad"; 4. "Yeah!" (featuring Lil Jon and Ludacris); 5. "Burn"; 6. "Confessions Part II"; 7. "My Boo (with Alicia Keys); 8. "Love in This Club" (featuring Young Jeezy); 9. "OMG" (featuring will.i.am)	
9		Katy Perry	List: 1. "I Kissed a Girl"; 2. "California Gurls" (featuring Snoop Dogg); 3. "Teenage Dream"; 4. "Firework"; 5. "E.T." (featuring Kanye West); 6. "Last Friday Night (T.G.I.F.); 7. "Part of Me"; 8. "Roar"; 9. "Dark Horse" (featuring Juicy J)	
9		Beyoncé	List: 1. "Crazy in Love" (featuring Jay-Z); 2. "Baby Boy" (featuring Sean Paul); 3. "Check on It" (featuring Slim Thug); 4. "Irreplaceable"; 5. "Single Ladies (Put a Ring on It)"; 6. "Perfect Duet" (with Ed Sheeran); 7. "Savage" (Megan Thee Stallion featuring Beyoncé); 8. "Break My Soul"; 9. "Texas Hold 'Em"	
8		The Rolling Stones	List: 1. "(I Can't Get No) Satisfaction"; 2. "Get Off of My Cloud"; 3. "Paint It Black"; 4. "Ruby Tuesday"; 5. "Honky Tonk Women"; 6. "Brown Sugar"; 7. "Angie"; 8. "Miss You"	
8		George Michael	List: 1. "Careless Whisper" (Wham! featuring George Michael); 2. "I Knew You Were Waiting (For Me)" (with Aretha Franklin); 3. "Faith"; 4. "Father Figure"; 5. "One More Try"; 6. "Monkey"; 7. "Praying for Time"; 8. "Don't Let the Sun Go Down on Me" (with Elton John)	
8		Justin Bieber	List: 1. "What Do You Mean?"; 2. "Sorry"; 3. "Love Yourself"; 4. "I'm the One" (DJ Khaled featuring Justin Bieber, Quavo, Chance the Rapper and Lil Wayne); 5. "Despacito" (Luis Fonsi and Daddy Yankee featuring Justin Bieber); 6. "Stuck with U" (with Ariana Grande); 7. "Peaches" (featuring Daniel Caesar and Giveon); 8. "Stay" (with the Kid Laroi)	

== See also ==
- Artists with the most number-ones on the U.S. Dance Club Songs chart
- List of Billboard Hot 100 chart achievements and milestones
- List of artists who reached number one in the United States
- List of artists with the most UK singles chart number ones
