= Madonna =

American singer and songwriter (born 1958)

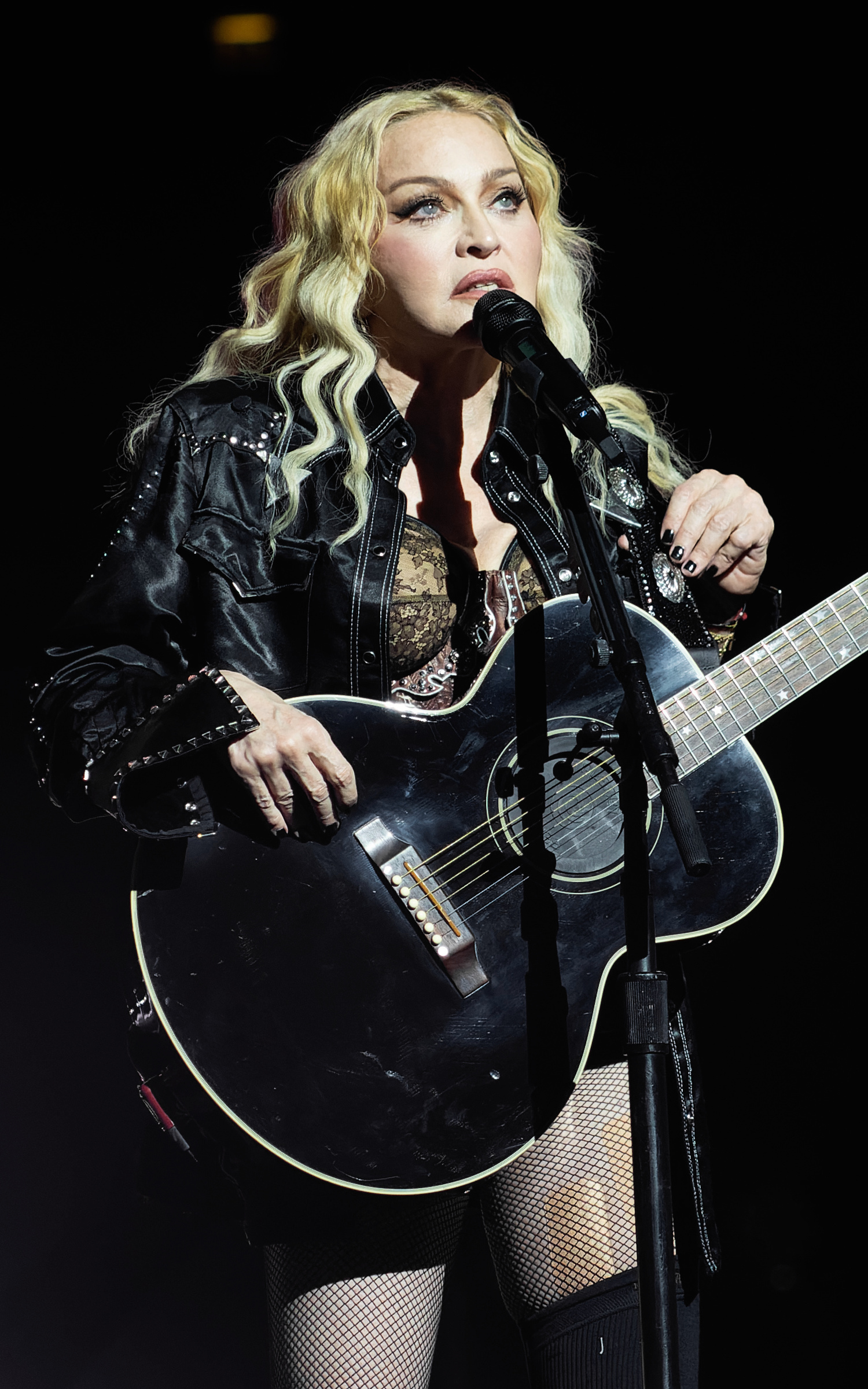
- Madonna in 2023
- Born: Madonna Louise Ciccone; August 16, 1958 (age 68); Bay City, Michigan, US
- Occupations: Singer; songwriter; record producer; actress
- Years active: 1979–present
- Works: Albums; songs; singles; unreleased; videos; concerts; films; books; fashion brands
- Spouses: Sean Penn (m. 1985; div. 1989) Guy Ritchie (m. 2000; div. 2008)
- Partner: Carlos Leon (1995–1997)
- Children: 6, including Lourdes Leon
- Relatives: Christopher Ciccone (brother)
- Awards: Full list
- Musical career
- Origin: New York City
- Genres: Pop; dance; electronic
- Instruments: Vocals; guitar
- Labels: Warner; Sire; Maverick; Interscope
- Formerly of: Breakfast Club; Emmy
- Website: madonna.com

Madonna Louise Ciccone (Note: Madonna goes by her first name, and has used the name and trademark since 1979 according to the World Intellectual Property Organization.) (/tʃɪˈkoʊni/ chih-KOH-nee, Italian: [tʃikˈkoːne]; born August 16, 1958) is an American singer, songwriter, record producer, and actress. Dubbed the "Queen of Pop", she is known for her continual reinvention and versatility in music production, songwriting, and visual presentation. Her works, which concern social, political, sexual, and religious themes, have drawn acclaim and controversy. Regarded as one of the most influential musicians in history, Madonna broke gender barriers in popular music and has had a significant socio-cultural impact across her career.

Born and raised in Michigan, Madonna moved to New York City in 1978 to pursue a career in dance. After performing as a drummer, guitarist, and vocalist in the rock bands Breakfast Club and Emmy, she rose to fame with her debut album, Madonna (1983). Her eighteen multi-platinum albums include Like a Virgin (1984), True Blue (1986), and The Immaculate Collection (1990), some of the best-selling albums of all time. Rolling Stone ranked Like a Prayer (1989), Ray of Light (1998), and Music (2000) among the greatest albums of all time. Madonna's top-charting singles include "Like a Virgin", "Papa Don't Preach", "La Isla Bonita", "Like a Prayer", "Vogue", "Take a Bow", "Frozen", "Music", "Hung Up", and "4 Minutes".

Madonna has starred in films such as Desperately Seeking Susan (1985), Dick Tracy (1990), A League of Their Own (1992), and Evita (1996). Although many of her films were not well-received, she won the Golden Globe Award for Best Actress for portraying Eva Perón in Evita. Her business endeavors encompass the entertainment company Maverick (1992–2009), which included Maverick Records—one of the most successful artist-run labels. Madonna has also pursued fashion brands, written works, health clubs, and filmmaking. She contributes to various charities, having founded the Ray of Light Foundation in 1998 and Raising Malawi in 2006, and advocates for gender equality and LGBTQ rights.

Madonna is the best-selling female music artist of all time, and the first female performer to accumulate US$1 billion from her concerts. She has twelve number-one singles on the US Billboard Hot 100 and ten number-one albums on the US Billboard 200. Her accolades include seven Grammy Awards, two Golden Globe Awards, 27 MTV Video Music Awards, and an induction into the Rock and Roll Hall of Fame in her first year of eligibility. Madonna was the world's highest-paid female musician for a record eleven years across four decades (1980s–2010s). She has become the subject of various scholarly, literary, and artistic works, giving rise to an academic subfield known as Madonna studies.

== Life and career ==
=== 1958–1978: Early life ===
Madonna Louise Ciccone was born in Bay City, Michigan, on August 16, 1958. Her mother, Madonna Louise (née Fortin), was an X-ray technician; her father, Silvio "Tony" Ciccone, worked as an optical and military engineer, as well as a physicist, for Chrysler Defense and later General Dynamics Land Systems. Tony's parents were Italian emigrants from Pacentro, while her mother was of French-Canadian descent. Since Madonna shared her name with her mother, family members referred to her as "Little Nonnie". Madonna was raised in the Detroit suburbs of Pontiac and Avon Township (now Rochester Hills), alongside her two older brothers, Anthony and Martin, and her three younger siblings, Paula, Christopher, and Melanie.

When Madonna was five years old, her mother died of breast cancer on December 1, 1963. In 1966, she adopted Veronica as a confirmation name upon receiving the sacrament in the Catholic Church. That same year, Tony married the family's housekeeper, Joan Gustafson. They had three children: Joey (who died shortly after his birth in 1967 from a heart defect), Jennifer, and Mario. Madonna attended St. Frederick's and St. Andrew's Catholic elementary schools, as well as West Middle School. She earned high grades—her father gave her a quarter for every A—and was notorious for her unconventional behavior. Madonna performed cartwheels and handstands in the hallways between classes, hung upside down from the monkey bars during recess, and lifted her skirt in class to amuse the boys.

In retrospect, Madonna described herself as a "lonely girl who was searching for something", explaining: "I wasn't rebellious in a certain way. I cared about being good at something. I didn't shave under my arms and I didn't wear makeup like normal girls do. But I studied and I got good grades [...] I wanted to be somebody." Her father initially enrolled her in classical piano lessons, but she eventually persuaded him to let her study ballet instead. Her ballet teacher, Christopher Flynn, inspired her to pursue a career in dance, remarking that she was the best student in the class. While attending Rochester Adams High School, Madonna was a straight-A student and a member of the cheerleading squad. After graduating in January 1976, she received a dance scholarship to the University of Michigan and spent the summer studying at the American Dance Festival in Durham, North Carolina.

In 1978, Madonna left college and moved to New York City. She called the decision "the bravest thing [she'd] ever done"; it was the first time she had ever flown or taken a taxi, and she arrived with "$35 in [her] pocket". She settled in the Alphabet City area of the East Village and supported herself with limited means by working various jobs—including as a hatcheck girl at the Russian Tea Room, an elevator operator at Terrace on the Park, and a member of dance troupes. Madonna took classes at the Alvin Ailey American Dance Theater, performed with the Pearl Lang Dance Theater, and studied under dancer and choreographer Martha Graham. One night, as she was returning from a rehearsal, two men held her at knifepoint and forced her to perform fellatio. She said later the incident was "a taste of my weakness, it showed me that I still could not save myself in spite of all the strong-girl show. I could never forget it." She was also raped at knifepoint after accepting an offer to use someone's phone in their apartment in New York.

=== 1979–1983: Career beginnings, rock bands, and Madonna ===
In 1979, Madonna entered a romantic relationship with musician Dan Gilroy. During this period, she searched for job opportunities in publications such as Variety, Backstage, and Show Business, leading to a successful audition as a backup singer and dancer in Paris for French disco artist Patrick Hernandez. With Hernandez's troupe, she traveled to Tunisia and several disco-oriented European countries before returning to New York that same year. Madonna relocated to an abandoned synagogue in Corona, Queens, where Gilroy and his brother Ed resided and practiced. The group slept in the basement and used its meeting space both to rehearse and record music for their band, Breakfast Club, for which Madonna sang and played drums and guitar.

Madonna made her acting debut in the low-budget indie film A Certain Sacrifice, which was shot in two parts between 1979 and 1981. She unsuccessfully attempted to block its 1985 release through legal action against director Stephen Jon Lewicki. The film was primarily criticized for its explicit sexual and violent content. In 1980, after leaving the Breakfast Club and ending her relationship with Gilroy, Madonna reunited with drummer Stephen Bray, whom she had previously dated in Michigan, and together they formed the band Emmy. She and Bray lived and rehearsed at the Music Building in Manhattan, where they wrote songs and recorded a four-track demo tape. After Madonna left Emmy, Camille Barbone, who ran Gotham Records in the Music Building, signed her to a contract with the label in March 1981, working as her manager until February 1982. Her creative partnership with Bray continued for many years.

In 1982, Madonna visited nightclubs to persuade DJs to play her demo, leading Mark Kamins at Danceteria to take an interest in her music and begin a romance with her. He arranged a meeting with Seymour Stein, president of Sire Records—a subsidiary of Warner Bros. Records—after which she signed a two-single deal. Kamins produced her debut single, "Everybody", which was released in October 1982 and promoted with television and nightclub performances. Her second single, the double A-side "Burning Up" / "Physical Attraction", was released in March 1983. Both "Everybody" and "Burning Up" / "Physical Attraction" reached number three on the Billboard Hot Dance Club Songs chart. During this period, Madonna was in a relationship with artist Jean-Michel Basquiat and living in his SoHo loft. Basquiat introduced her to art curator Diego Cortez, who had managed several punk bands. Cortez declined to manage Madonna when she requested that he do so.

Warner hired Reggie Lucas to produce her debut studio album, Madonna. Madonna was dissatisfied with many of the tracks, prompting her to seek additional support. She enlisted DJ John "Jellybean" Benitez to help complete the album, and the two began a brief romantic relationship. Benitez remixed most of the songs and produced "Holiday", her breakthrough song. Madonna was released on July 27, 1983, to generally favorable reviews, and peaked at number eight on the US Billboard 200. The album generated two US Billboard Hot 100 top-ten singles: "Borderline" and "Lucky Star". In late 1983, Madonna's new manager, Freddy DeMann, arranged a meeting with film producer Jon Peters, who offered her the role of a club singer in the romantic drama Vision Quest (1985).

=== 1984–1987: Like a Virgin, first marriage, True Blue, and Who's That Girl ===
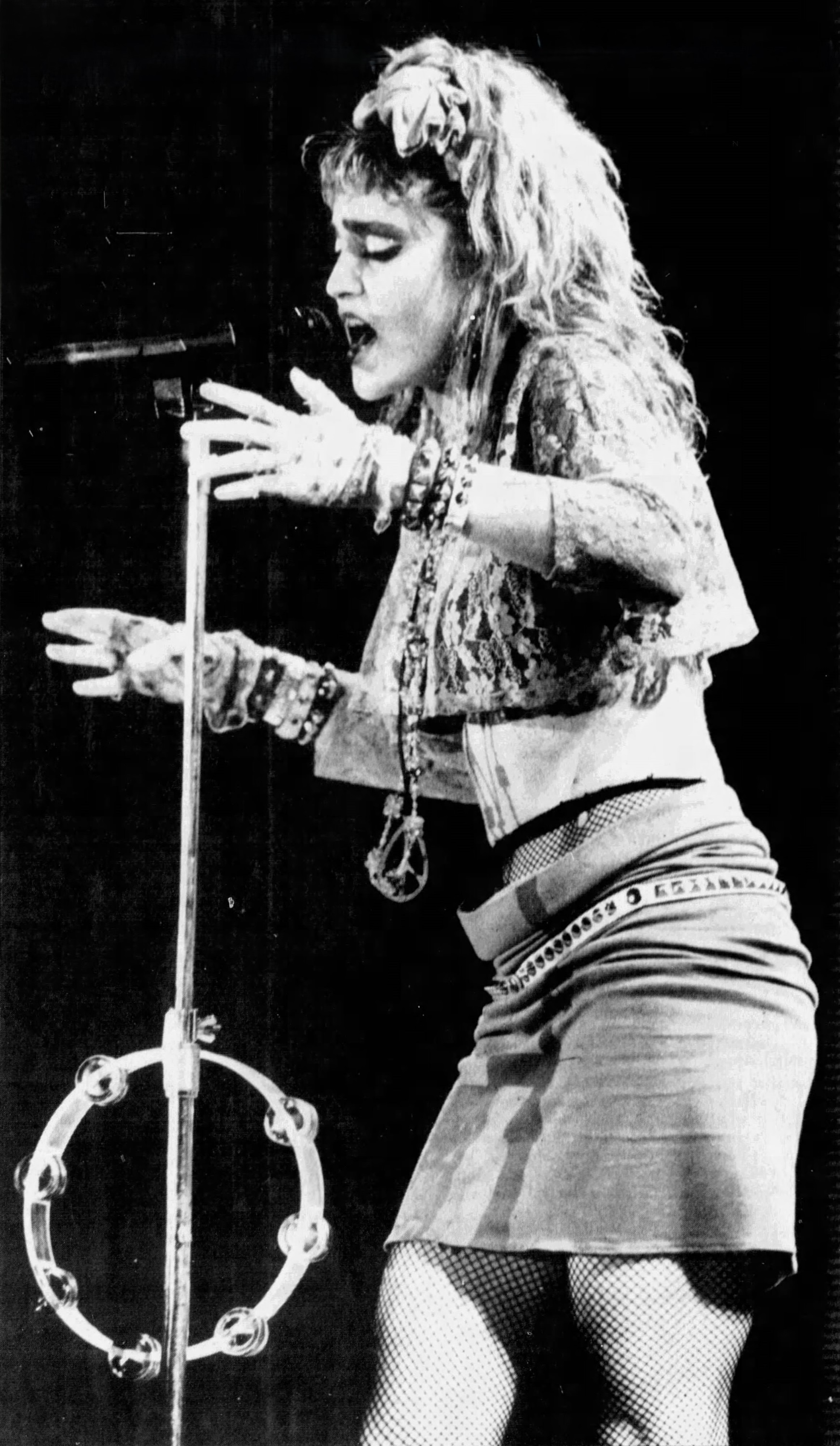
Madonna performing in 1985 during the Virgin Tour

In January 1984, Madonna gained further exposure with performances on American Bandstand and Top of the Pops. Wanting the material on her second studio album, Like a Virgin, to be "stronger" than that of her debut, she selected all of the songs herself, five of which she wrote or co-wrote. Like a Virgin was released on November 12, 1984, and became her first number-one album in Germany, Italy, the Netherlands, New Zealand, Spain, the UK and the US. In the lattermost nation, the album remained atop the Billboard 200 for three weeks and is the first album by a woman to sell over five million copies. Like a Virgin has sold over 21 million copies worldwide, making it one of the best-selling albums.

Warner issued "Like a Virgin" as the lead single from the album. It was her first number-one on the Billboard Hot 100, topping the chart for six consecutive weeks. "Like a Virgin" attracted the attention of conservative organizations, who complained that the song and its accompanying video promoted premarital sex and undermined family values; moralists sought to have the song and video banned. Madonna attracted significant media attention for her performance of the song at the inaugural MTV Video Music Awards in 1984. Dressed in a wedding gown and white gloves, she appeared atop a large wedding cake before moving across the stage in a provocative manner. MTV News later described the performance as one of the most iconic in pop music history.

The second single, "Material Girl", peaked at number two on the Billboard Hot 100. While filming its music video, Madonna began a relationship with actor Sean Penn and they married on her twenty-seventh birthday in 1985. In Vision Quest (1985), Madonna appears as a nightclub singer and performs "Crazy for You"—her second Billboard Hot 100 number-one single. That same year, she starred as the titular character in the comedy Desperately Seeking Susan, depicting a free-spirited bohemian drifter whose path intersects with a bored housewife through personal ads. The film included the song "Into the Groove", her first number-one single on the UK singles chart. Desperately Seeking Susan was named one of the ten best films of 1985 by Vincent Canby, a The New York Times film critic.

In April 1985, Madonna began her first North American concert series, the Virgin Tour. It coincided with the height of the Madonna wannabe phenomenon, as many of her young female fans adopted her fashion style. Styled by Maripol, her look—which included lace tops, skirts over capri pants, fishnet stockings, crucifix jewelry, stacked bracelets, and bleached hair—became widely associated with 1980s female fashion trends. Around this time, Madonna released two additional singles for Like a Virgin, "Angel" and "Dress You Up", both of which reached the top five of the Billboard Hot 100. In July 1985, Penthouse and Playboy published nude photographs of Madonna taken in 1978, when she worked as an art model. She had posed for the images for modest pay, reportedly $25 per session; the photographs were later sold for up to $100,000. The publication caused significant media attention, though Madonna remained unapologetic.

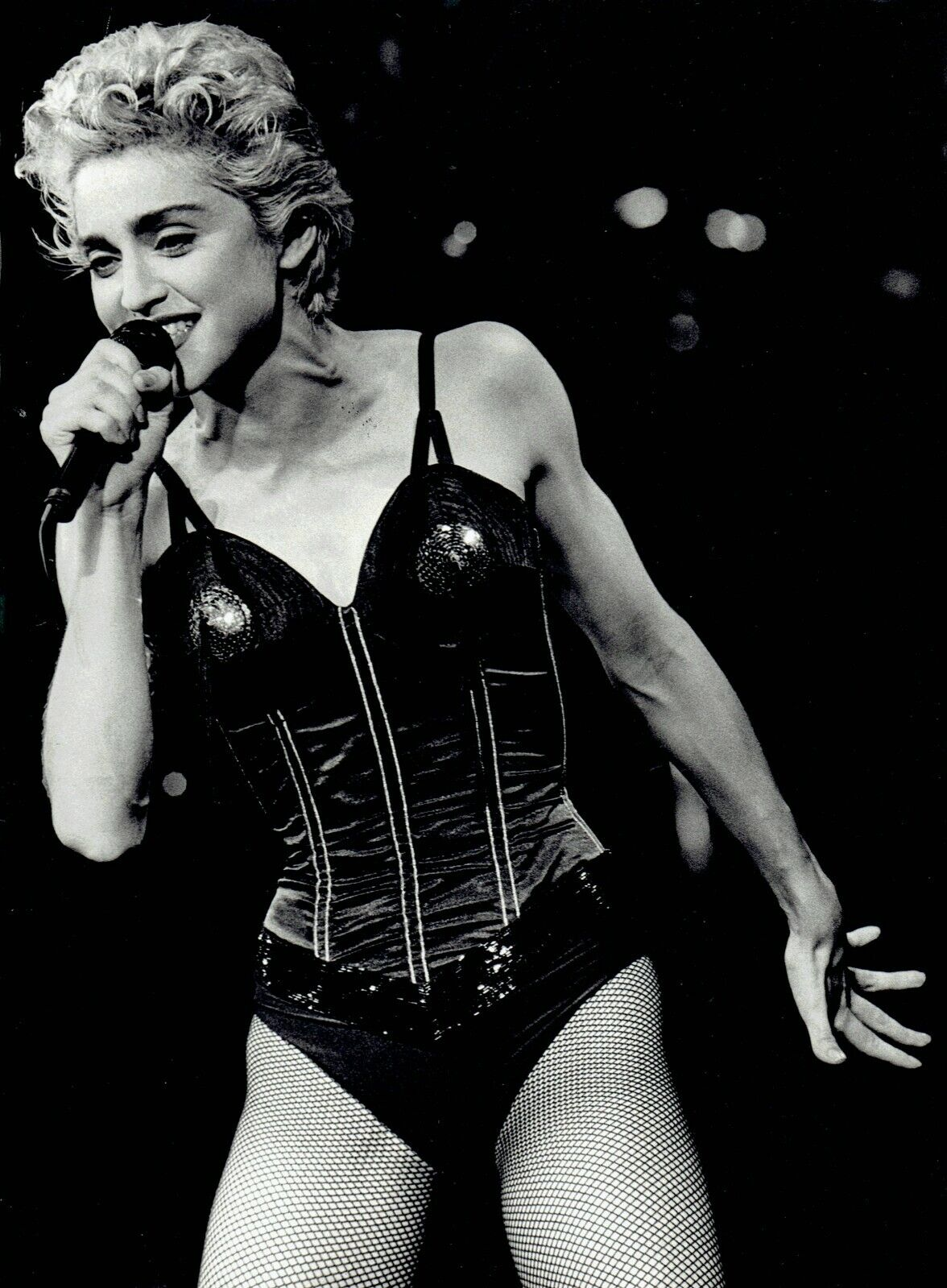
Madonna performing during the 1987 Who's That Girl World Tour

Madonna co-wrote and co-produced every track on her third studio album, True Blue. Inspired by and dedicated to her husband Penn, the album was released on June 30, 1986, to critical acclaim. It topped the charts in an unprecedented 28 countries worldwide, including the US, where it remained at number one on the Billboard 200 for five weeks. All five singles released from the album reached the top five on the Billboard Hot 100; "Live to Tell", "Papa Don't Preach", and "Open Your Heart" made Madonna the second female artist to have three songs from a single album top the chart. "True Blue" and "La Isla Bonita" also topped the European singles chart; the latter became the continent's biggest single of 1987. True Blue was the best-selling album of 1986, the best-selling album of the 1980s by a female artist, and one of the best-selling albums in history, with 25 million copies sold globally.

Madonna appeared in the film Shanghai Surprise (1986) alongside Penn, which was critically unsuccessful and earned her the Golden Raspberry Award for Worst Actress. She made her stage debut the same year in David Rabe's Goose and Tom-Tom, which also starred Penn. In 1987, she starred in the film Who's That Girl and contributed four songs to its soundtrack, including "Who's That Girl" and "Causing a Commotion", which peaked at numbers one and two on the Billboard Hot 100, respectively. In June, she embarked on the Who's That Girl World Tour, which broke several attendance records, including a performance near Paris attended by over 130,000 people—the highest for a female artist at the time. In 1987, she released You Can Dance, a remix album with reworked versions of songs from her earlier releases. After a turbulent two-year marriage, Madonna filed for divorce from Penn on December 4, 1987, though she later withdrew the petition.

=== 1988–1991: Like a Prayer, Dick Tracy, and The Immaculate Collection ===
Madonna made her Broadway theatre debut in the play Speed-the-Plow at the Royale Theatre, running from May to August 1988. According to the Associated Press, she filed an assault report against Penn following an alleged incident at their Malibu residence over New Year's weekend. Madonna filed for divorce on January 5, 1989, and reportedly requested the following week that no criminal charges be pursued. That month, Madonna signed an endorsement agreement with soft-drink company Pepsi. In a commercial for the company, she premiered the song "Like a Prayer", whose accompanying music video featured Catholic imagery such as stigmata and cross burning, as well as a dream sequence depicting intimacy with a saint, prompting condemnation from the Vatican. Religious organizations called for a boycott of Pepsi products, leading the company to withdraw the commercial and terminate her sponsorship deal.

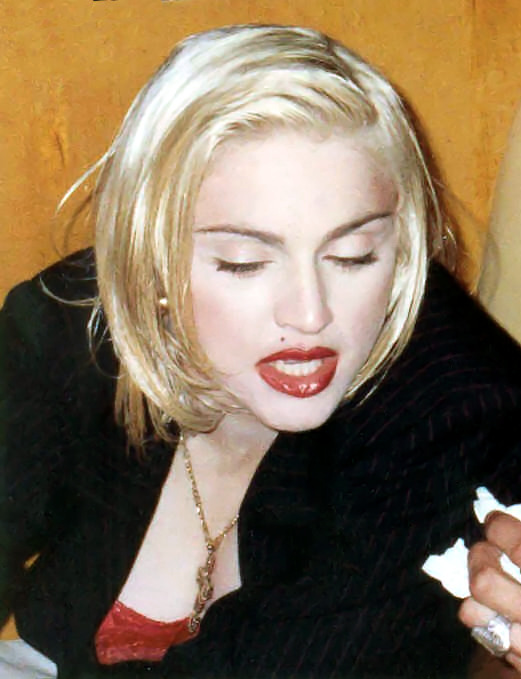
Madonna at the AIDS Project Los Angeles benefit concert in 1990

"Like a Prayer" was released as the lead single from her fourth studio album, also titled Like a Prayer. The song became her seventh number-one single on the Billboard Hot 100 and spent three weeks atop the chart. Madonna co-wrote and co-produced her album alongside Patrick Leonard, Stephen Bray, and Prince. In the US, Like a Prayer was released on March 21, 1989, to universal acclaim from critics. Rolling Stone's J. D. Considine described it as "proof not only that Madonna should be taken seriously as an artist but that hers is one of the most compelling voices of the Eighties". Like a Prayer spent six weeks atop the Billboard 200—the longest of any of her albums—and eventually sold 15 million copies worldwide. The singles "Express Yourself" and "Cherish" both reached number two in the US, while "Keep It Together" peaked within the top ten. Billboard and MTV named Madonna "Artist of the Decade" (1980s).

In April 1990, she launched the Blond Ambition World Tour. Rolling Stone described it as an "elaborately choreographed, sexually provocative extravaganza" and named it the best tour of 1990. It drew criticism from religious organizations, particularly for her performance of "Like a Virgin", in which she simulated masturbation while being caressed by two male dancers. Madonna defended the show, stating that it was intended for "open minds" and encouraged audiences to view sexuality differently. The live recording of the tour earned Madonna the Grammy Award for Best Long Form Music Video. Her first documentary film, Truth or Dare (titled In Bed with Madonna outside North America), was released in May 1991. Chronicling her Blond Ambition World Tour, it became the highest-grossing documentary ever at the time, a record it held until it was surpassed eleven years later.

Madonna portrayed Breathless Mahoney in the film Dick Tracy (1990), directed by and starring Warren Beatty in the title role. The film topped the US box office for two consecutive weeks, and Owen Gleiberman of Entertainment Weekly praised Madonna's performance, saying that he wished she had been given more screen time. To accompany the film, she released the soundtrack album I'm Breathless, with songs largely inspired by 1930s music. It spawned the single "Vogue", which topped the charts in more than 30 countries, including the US, where it peaked at number one on the Hot 100 for three weeks. During production, Madonna and Beatty began a relationship that ended shortly after the film's premiere. In October 1990, she recorded a public service announcement supporting Rock the Vote's voter registration campaign.

Madonna's first greatest-hits compilation album, The Immaculate Collection, was released in November 1990. The album has sold 30 million copies worldwide, making it the best-selling compilation album by a solo artist and one of the best-selling albums in history. The set included two new songs, "Justify My Love" and "Rescue Me". Model Tony Ward, Madonna's then-boyfriend, co-starred in the music video for "Justify My Love", which included imagery of sadomasochism, bondage, same-sex intimacy, and brief nudity. Considered too sexually explicit, the video was banned by MTV. The resulting controversy contributed to the song reaching number one on the Billboard Hot 100, becoming her ninth chart-topping single. "Rescue Me" later peaked at number nine on the chart.

=== 1992–1997: Maverick, Erotica, Sex, Bedtime Stories, Evita, and motherhood ===
In 1992, Madonna appeared in the film A League of Their Own as a member of an all-women's baseball team. The film reached number one at the US box office in its second weekend of release. Madonna also recorded its theme song, "This Used to Be My Playground", which became her tenth Billboard Hot 100 number-one single, the most for a woman at the time. In April 1992, Madonna established the entertainment company Maverick, which included a record label, film production unit, and divisions for music publishing, television, book publishing, and merchandising. The venture was a partnership with Time Warner and provided her with a $60 million advance and a 20 percent royalty rate—the highest in the industry at the time. Maverick went on to become one of the most successful artist-run labels in history, signing successful acts such as Alanis Morissette and Michelle Branch.

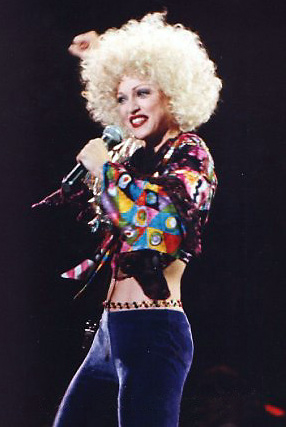
Madonna performing at the Girlie Show in 1993

Later in 1992, Madonna co-sponsored the first museum retrospective of her former partner, artist Jean-Michel Basquiat, at the Whitney Museum of American Art in New York. She released her fifth studio album, Erotica, on October 20, 1992, in the US, and published her coffee table book Sex a day later. Sex featured sexually provocative and explicit images photographed by Steven Meisel and drew strong negative reactions from critics, the general public, and conservative, feminist and anti-porn groups; initial interest propelled the book to the top of The New York Times Best Seller list. A writer from The Washington Post described it as an "oversized, overpriced, [and boring] coffee table book of hardcore sexual fantasies".

The widespread backlash overshadowed Erotica, which became her lowest-selling album at the time. It reached number two on the US Billboard 200, and received favorable reviews from critics. The singles "Erotica" and "Deeper and Deeper" reached the top ten of the Billboard Hot 100 and number one in Italy. During this period, Madonna was in a relationship with rapper Vanilla Ice, to whom she proposed. The pair separated following the release of Sex, with Vanilla Ice claiming he had been included in the book without his consent. Her performances in the 1993 films Body of Evidence and Dangerous Game were poorly received. The former featured scenes of sadomasochism and bondage, while she played the abused wife of a filmmaker in the latter.

Madonna launched her fourth concert tour, the Girlie Show, in September 1993, during which she appeared as a whip-cracking dominatrix and performed alongside topless dancers. She made a highly publicized appearance on the Late Show with David Letterman in March 1994, using profanity that required broadcast censorship and handing Letterman a pair of her underwear while urging him to smell it. The sexually explicit releases of Sex and Erotica, along with her film roles and controversial Letterman appearance, prompted commentators to question her dependence on provocative imagery. Madonna briefly dated rapper Tupac Shakur and basketball player Dennis Rodman around this time. Biographer J. Randy Taraborrelli viewed Madonna's ballad "I'll Remember"—recorded for the film With Honors (1994)—as an effort to soften her provocative image. It peaked at number two on the Billboard Hot 100.

With her sixth studio album, Bedtime Stories, Madonna embraced a gentler sound and image to regain public favor. Released in the US on October 25, 1994, the album debuted at number three on the Billboard 200 and produced the singles "Secret" and "Take a Bow", which peaked at numbers three and one on the Billboard Hot 100, respectively. "Take a Bow" spent seven weeks atop the chart, making it her longest-running number-one. Madonna sponsored the first major retrospective of Tina Modotti's work at the Philadelphia Museum of Art in 1995, and later supported exhibitions of Basquiat's paintings at London's Serpentine Gallery and Cindy Sherman at New York City's Museum of Modern Art. In November 1995, Madonna released Something to Remember, a compilation album that comprises Madonna's ballads across the past decade. The record debuted at number six on the Billboard 200 and has sold ten million copies worldwide.

This is the role I was born to play. I put everything of me into this because it was much more than a role in a movie. It was exhilarating and intimidating at the same time. And I am prouder of Evita than anything else I have done.

— Madonna talking about her role in Evita

In February 1996, Madonna began filming the musical Evita in Argentina. Having long aspired to portray Argentine political leader Eva Perón, she wrote to director Alan Parker to express her interest in the role. After being cast, she undertook vocal training and studied Argentina's history and Perón's life. During production, Madonna experienced several bouts of illness related to pregnancy and the emotional demands of the film. Upon its release in December 1996, her performance was met with positive reviews from critics. Richard Corliss, writing for Time, described the film as well cast and visually impressive, lauding Madonna's ability to exceed expectations. Her portrayal earned her the Golden Globe Award for Best Actress in a Motion Picture – Musical or Comedy.

The Evita soundtrack, which peaked at number two on the Billboard 200, contained songs primarily performed by Madonna. These included "You Must Love Me" and "Don't Cry for Me Argentina", the latter of which topped the European singles chart. On October 14, 1996, she gave birth to her daughter, Lourdes "Lola" Maria Ciccone Leon, with fitness trainer Carlos Leon. According to biographer Mary Cross, Madonna—who had expressed concern that her pregnancy might jeopardize Evita—fulfilled significant personal goals: "Madonna had at last triumphed on screen and achieved her dream of having a child, both in the same year [...] reinventing herself and her image with the public". Her relationship with Carlos ended in May 1997, and she stated that they were "better off as best friends".

=== 1998–2002: Ray of Light, Music, second marriage, and touring comeback ===
After the birth of Lourdes, Madonna developed an interest in Eastern mysticism and Kabbalah, introduced to her by actress Sandra Bernhard. This change in perception influenced her seventh studio album, Ray of Light. She collaborated with electronic music producer William Orbit to create a fusion of dance, pop, and British rock. Music critic Ann Powers said Madonna sought "a kind of lushness" for the album rather than the party-oriented sounds of 1990s techno and rave genres, opting instead for a more singer-songwriter approach that Orbit helped her achieve. Ray of Light was released on February 22, 1998. It debuted at number two on the Billboard 200 with the highest first-week sales for a woman at the time, topped the charts of 17 countries, and eventually sold over 16 million copies globally. Critically acclaimed, Ray of Light is widely regarded as Madonna's magnum opus.

The album's two highest-charting singles, "Frozen" and "Ray of Light", peaked at numbers two and five on the US Billboard Hot 100, with the former becoming her first song to debut at number one in the UK. At the 41st Annual Grammy Awards, Madonna won four awards, including Best Pop Album for Ray of Light, and Best Dance Recording and Best Short Form Music Video for the title track. In 1998, Madonna established the Ray of Light Foundation, a non-profit for women, education, global development, and humanitarian aid. She recorded the single "Beautiful Stranger" for the film Austin Powers: The Spy Who Shagged Me (1999), which earned her a Grammy Award for Best Song Written for a Motion Picture, Television or Other Visual Media. She starred as a yoga teacher in the comedy-drama The Next Best Thing (2000), which received negative reviews and opened at number two at the US box office. For the soundtrack, she recorded a cover of Don McLean's "American Pie", her ninth UK number-one single.

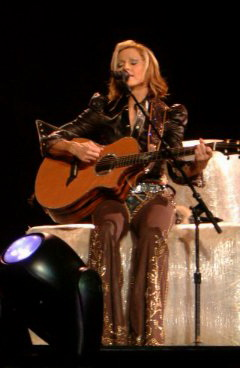
Madonna performing at the Drowned World Tour in 2001

On September 18, 2000, Madonna released her eighth studio album, Music, to critical acclaim. She collaborated with French producer Mirwais Ahmadzaï, and expressed a preference for working with unconventional, lesser-known artists who "are making music unlike anyone else out there". The album reached number one in over twenty countries and sold four million copies within the first ten days of release. In the US, Music debuted atop the Billboard 200, becoming her first number-one album in eleven years since Like a Prayer. The singles "Music" and "Don't Tell Me" peaked at numbers one and four on the Billboard Hot 100, respectively; the former became her twelfth song to peak atop the chart. Since its release, Music has sold over 11 million units worldwide.

Madonna met director Guy Ritchie in mid-1998 at a dinner party hosted by mutual friends Sting and Trudie Styler. She gave birth to their son, Rocco John Ritchie, in Los Angeles on August 11, 2000. She and Rocco experienced complications during the birth due to her placenta praevia. He was christened at Dornoch Cathedral in Scotland on December 21, 2000, and Madonna married Ritchie the following day at nearby Skibo Castle. In June 2001, she launched the Drowned World Tour, her first tour in eight years. It visited cities across the US and Europe, becoming the highest-grossing tour of the year by a solo artist with $75 million in revenue. That same year, she released her second greatest-hits album, GHV2, featuring a selection of her successful songs from the 1990s onward. It debuted at number seven in the US and sold seven million copies worldwide.

In 2002, Madonna starred in Ritchie's Swept Away, a remake of Lina Wertmüller's 1974 film. The film was commercially unsuccessful and universally panned, with A. O. Scott, writing for The New York Times, stating that "a role like this one requires the surrender of emotional control, something Madonna seems constitutionally unable to achieve". In May 2002, she appeared in the West End play Up for Grabs at the Wyndhams Theatre, which was poorly received by critics. Later that year, Madonna released "Die Another Day", the theme song for the James Bond film of the same name, in which she also had a cameo role that Peter Bradshaw of The Guardian described as "incredibly wooden". The song reached number eight on the Billboard Hot 100, and was nominated for the Golden Globe Award for Best Original Song and two Grammy Awards.

=== 2003–2006: American Life and Confessions on a Dance Floor ===
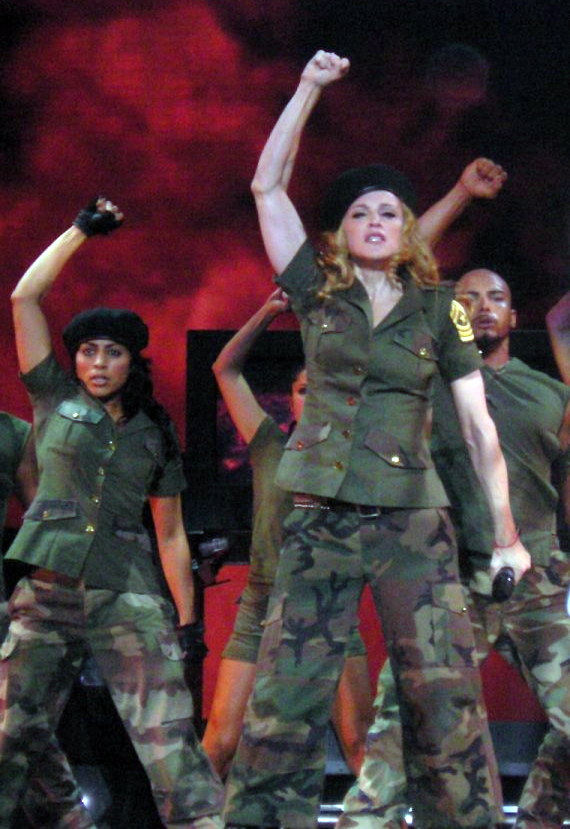
Madonna performing at the Re-Invention World Tour in 2004

In 2003, Madonna worked with fashion photographer Steven Klein on an exhibition installation titled X-STaTIC Pro=CeSS. The project was presented from March to May at New York's Deitch Projects gallery and was later shown internationally in a revised version.

Madonna reunited with Ahmadzaï to produce her ninth studio album, American Life—a reflection of her views on American society. The record, released on April 21, 2003, was met with mixed reception and debuted atop the US Billboard 200. American Life became her lowest-selling release, with worldwide sales of four million copies by 2005. Four singles were released from the album: "American Life", "Hollywood", "Nothing Fails", and "Love Profusion". "American Life" was its only track to enter the Billboard Hot 100, peaking at number 37. The tracks fared better internationally; "American Life" topped the charts in Canada and Italy, while "Nothing Fails" and "Love Profusion" reached number one in Spain. "American Life" and "Hollywood" both reached number two in the UK.

The original music video of "American Life" caused controversy due to its violence and anti-war movement imagery, and was withdrawn after the 2003 invasion of Iraq began. Madonna voluntarily censored herself due to the political climate of the country. Her performance at the 2003 MTV Video Music Awards—in which she kissed singers Britney Spears and Christina Aguilera while performing "Hollywood"—was highly publicized. Shortly afterwards, Madonna collaborated with Spears on the single "Me Against the Music" which was released that September. She then released Remixed & Revisited, an extended play featuring new remixes of songs from American Life and the unreleased "Your Honesty". Madonna signed a contract with Callaway Arts & Entertainment to write five children's books. The first, titled The English Roses, was published in September 2003 and tells the story of four English schoolgirls struggling with envy and jealousy. The book became the fastest-selling children's picture book at the time, with all proceeds donated to a children's charity.

In March 2004, Madonna and Maverick filed a lawsuit against Warner Music Group and its former parent company, Time Warner, alleging financial mismanagement and poor accounting practices that resulted in significant losses. Warner countersued, claiming Maverick had incurred substantial losses independently. The dispute was settled when Warner acquired the Maverick shares held by Madonna and Ronnie Dashev, making the company a wholly owned subsidiary of Warner Music. Madonna remained signed to Warner under a separate recording contract. She launched the Re-Invention World Tour in May, performing across North America and Europe. The tour became 2004's highest-grossing, earning over $120 million, and was later chronicled in her documentary I'm Going to Tell You a Secret (2005). In November 2004, she was inducted into the UK Music Hall of Fame as one of its five founding members.

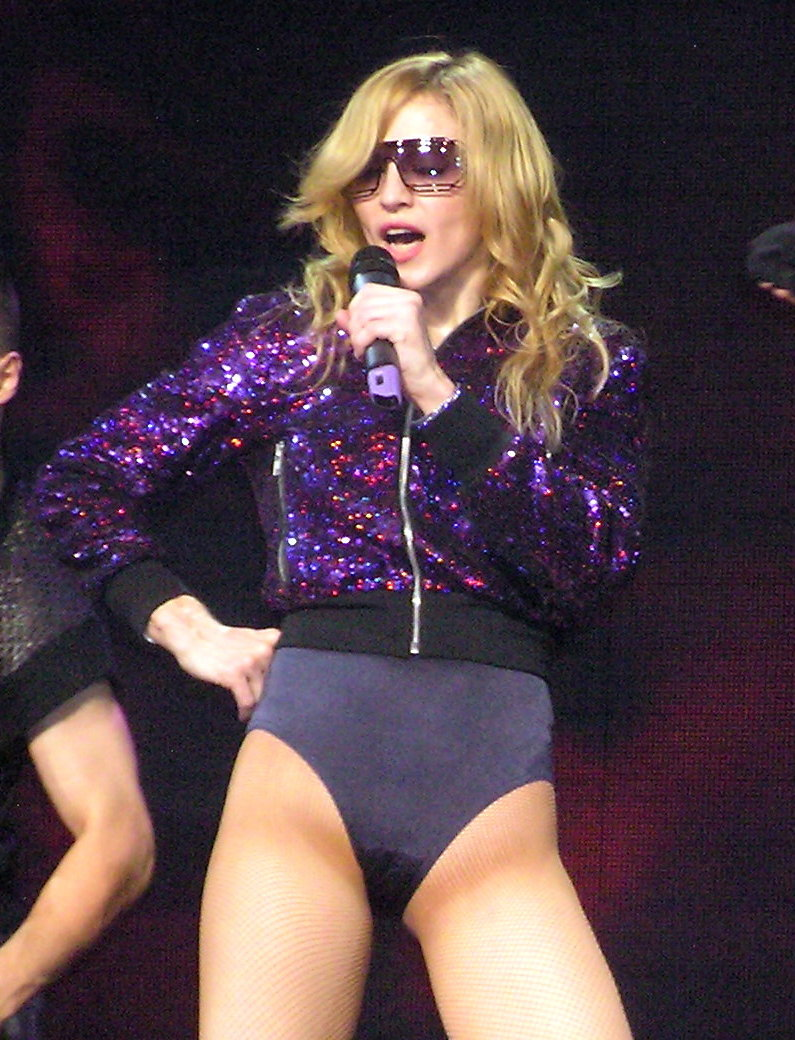
Madonna performing at the Confessions Tour in 2006

In January 2005, Madonna performed John Lennon's "Imagine" at Tsunami Aid and appeared at the Live 8 benefit concert in London six months later. She initially worked with Ahmadzaï to produce her tenth studio album, Confessions on a Dance Floor, but later turned to Stuart Price to attain the sound she was seeking. Structured like a continuous DJ mixed club set, the album was released in the US on November 15, 2005, to critical acclaim. Keith Caulfield, writing in Billboard, heralded the album as a "welcome return to form for the Queen of Pop". Confessions on a Dance Floor topped the charts in a record-breaking 40 countries, won Madonna the Grammy Award for Best Electronic/Dance Album at the 49th Annual Grammy Awards, and sold over 10 million copies worldwide.

The lead single, "Hung Up", reached number one in a record-breaking forty-one countries. It sampled ABBA's "Gimme! Gimme! Gimme! (A Man After Midnight)", marking the second time the band permitted such use. ABBA songwriter Björn Ulvaeus called it "a wonderful track—100 per cent solid pop music". The album's second single, "Sorry", became Madonna's twelfth number-one single in the UK. Madonna launched the Confessions Tour in May 2006, which grossed more than $193.7 million, making it the highest-grossing tour by a woman at the time. During the performance of "Live to Tell", she used religious imagery, including a crucifix and a crown of thorns, prompting the Russian Orthodox Church and the Federation of Jewish Communities of Russia to call for a boycott.

While touring, Madonna founded the charitable organization Raising Malawi and helped fund an orphanage in the country. There, she decided to adopt a boy named David Banda in 2006. The adoption provoked public debate, as Malawian law required prospective parents to reside in the country for one year before adopting, a condition Madonna did not meet. Malawi's Minister of Women and Child Development, Kate Kainja, had also blocked officials from traveling to meet Madonna and Ritchie as potential adopters. Speaking on The Oprah Winfrey Show, Madonna explained that Malawi had no formal adoption laws for foreigners and described how Banda had been suffering from pneumonia after surviving malaria and tuberculosis. Banda's father, Yohane, defended the adoption, saying he understood and supported the arrangement. The adoption was finalized in May 2008.

=== 2007–2011: Filmmaking, Hard Candy, and business ventures ===
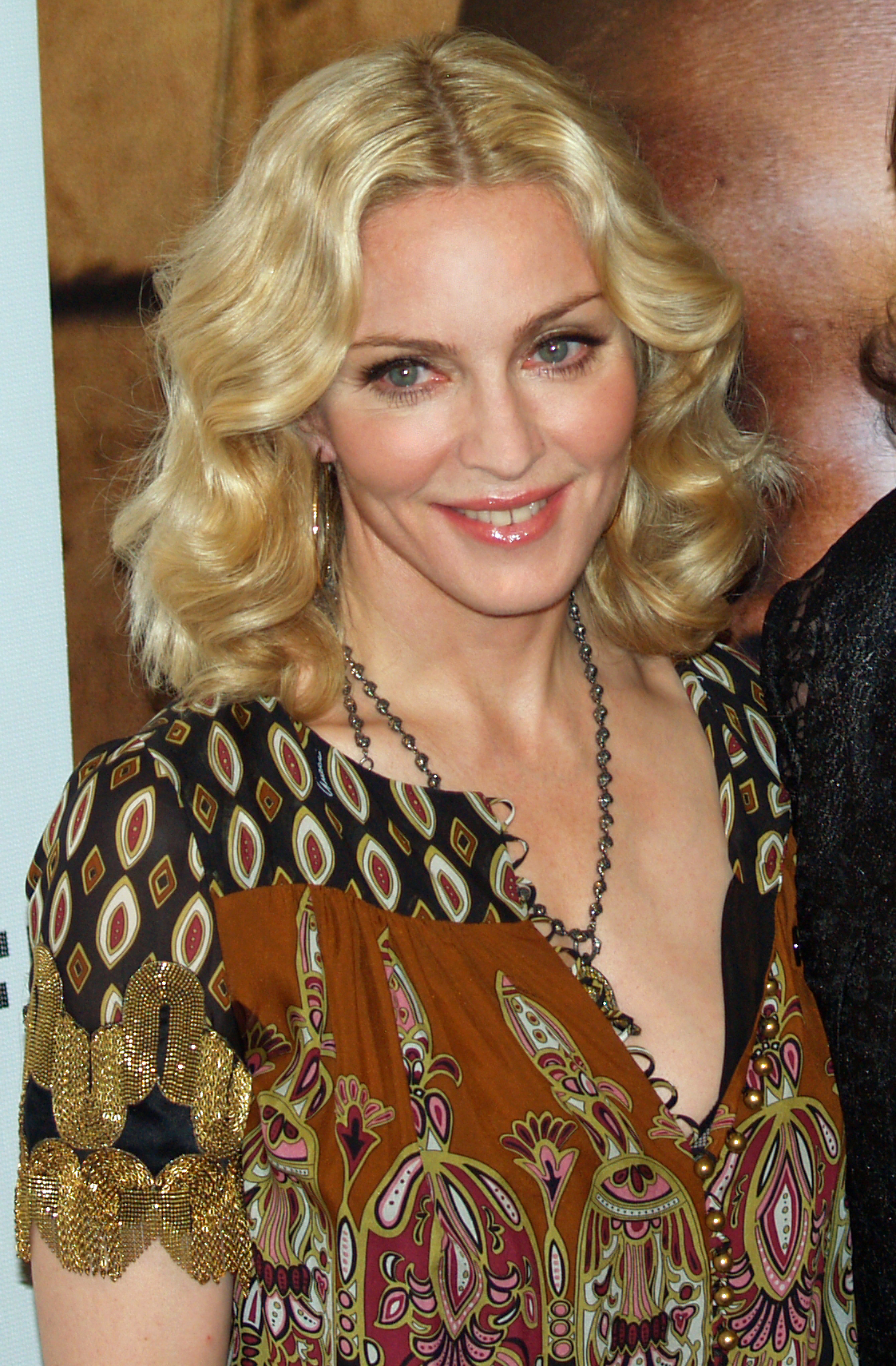
Madonna at the premiere of I Am Because We Are in 2008

In July 2007, Madonna released and performed "Hey You" at the London Live Earth concert. She subsequently announced her departure from Warner Bros. Records and signed a ten-year, $120 million 360 deal with Live Nation. She produced, wrote, and narrated I Am Because We Are (2008), a documentary directed by Nathan Rissman that addressed social issues in Malawi. That same year, she directed her first feature film, Filth and Wisdom, which follows three friends pursuing their ambitions. Reviews were largely negative, with The Times describing it as a commendable debut and The Daily Telegraph calling it a promising but imperfect first effort. On March 10, 2008, Madonna was inducted into the Rock and Roll Hall of Fame, becoming the second female solo artist to achieve it in her first year of eligibility, after Janis Joplin in 1995.

Madonna worked with Justin Timberlake, Timbaland, and Pharrell Williams to produce her eleventh studio album, Hard Candy. Released on April 29, 2008, Hard Candy debuted atop the charts of 37 countries, including the US Billboard 200. The lead single, "4 Minutes", peaked at number three on the Billboard Hot 100, becoming her thirty-seventh top-ten entry in the US and surpassing Elvis Presley's record for the most top-ten songs. In the UK, "4 Minutes" extended her record as the female artist with the most number-one singles. Rolling Stone's Caryn Ganz described Hard Candy as "an impressive preview of her upcoming tour", while BBC correspondent Mark Savage criticized it as "an attempt to capture the urban market". She launched the Sticky & Sweet Tour in August 2008, her first major venture with Live Nation. Grossing over $408 million, it became the second highest-grossing tour in history and the highest-grossing tour by a solo artist.

In July 2008, Madonna's brother Christopher published the book Life with My Sister Madonna, which created a rift between the two due to its unauthorized release. In October, Madonna filed for divorce from Ritchie, citing irreconcilable differences. Two months later, her spokesperson confirmed that a settlement had been reached, granting Ritchie between £50–60 million ($68.49–82.19 million), including the couple's London pub, residence, and Wiltshire estate. The marriage was formally dissolved through a decree nisi at the Principal Registry of the Family Division in High Holborn, London. Custody of their sons, Rocco and David, then aged eight and three, was shared between Ritchie's London home and Madonna's residence in New York, where they lived alongside Lourdes. In May 2009, Madonna applied to adopt Chifundo "Mercy" James from Malawi, but the country's High Court denied the request on the grounds that she was not a resident. She appealed the decision, and in June, the Supreme Court overturned the ruling and granted her permission to adopt her.

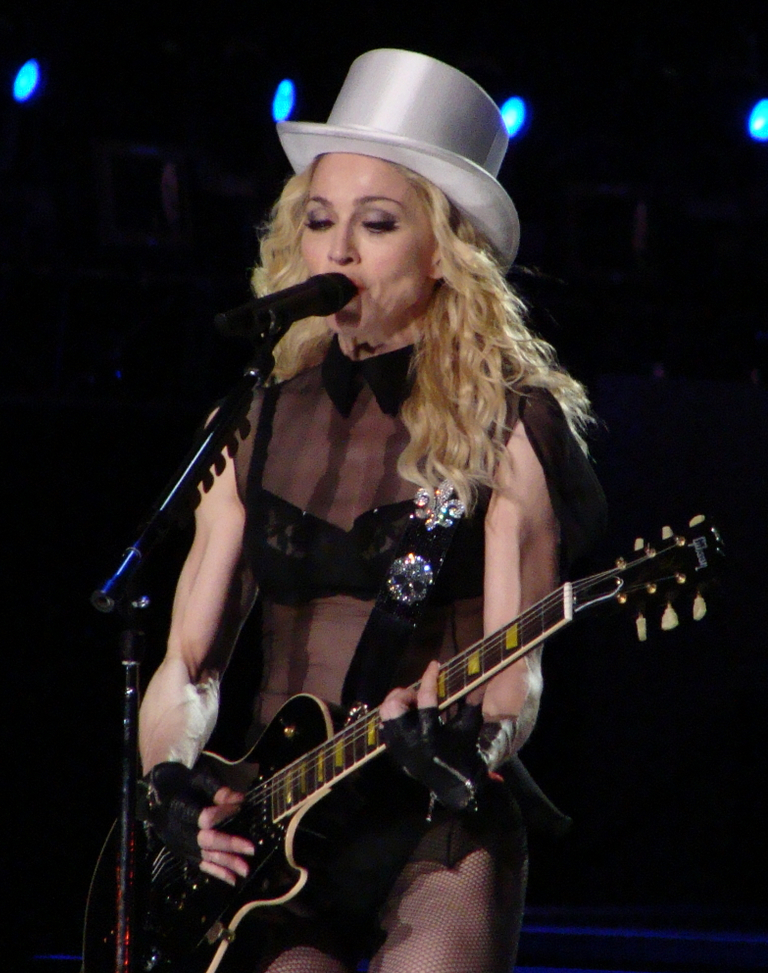
Madonna performing during the Sticky & Sweet Tour in 2008

Madonna concluded her contract with Warner Records with the release of her third greatest-hits album, Celebration, in September 2009. The compilation included two new tracks, along with thirty-four songs spanning her career with the label. The album reached number one in multiple countries, including Canada, Germany, Italy, and the UK. She appeared at the 2009 MTV Video Music Awards to deliver a tribute to the deceased singer Michael Jackson. By the end of the decade, Madonna was recognized as the most successful singles artist of the 2000s in the US and the most-played artist of the decade in the UK. Billboard ranked her as the third highest-grossing touring artist of the 2000s, with earnings exceeding $801 million, over 6.3 million attendees, and 244 sold-out performances out of 248 shows. In January 2010, Madonna performed at Hope for Haiti Now: A Global Benefit for Earthquake Relief concert.

Madonna's third live album, Sticky & Sweet Tour, was released in April 2010, debuting at number ten in the US. That year, she authorized the television series Glee to feature her entire music catalog, leading to an episode composed exclusively of her songs. She also collaborated with her daughter Lourdes to launch the Material Girl clothing line, inspired by her 1980s fashion. In October 2010, she founded the global fitness chain Hard Candy Fitness, and in November 2011 introduced a second lifestyle brand, Truth or Dare, offering footwear, fragrances, lingerie, and accessories. Her second directorial feature was W.E. (2011), a biographical drama about the relationship between King Edward VIII and Wallis Simpson. The film received an unfavorable critical and commercial response. Its soundtrack included the ballad "Masterpiece", which earned Madonna a Golden Globe Award for Best Original Song.

=== 2012–2016: Super Bowl XLVI halftime show, MDNA, and Rebel Heart ===
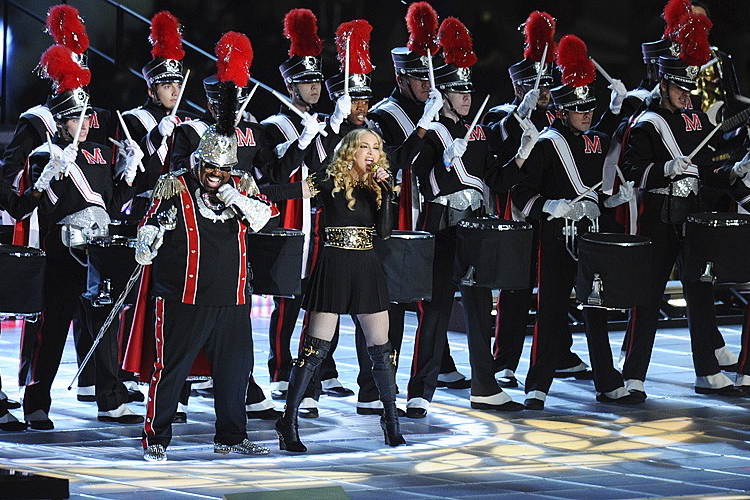
Madonna, joined by Cee Lo Green and a marching band, performing during the Super Bowl XLVI halftime show on February 5, 2012

In February 2012, Madonna headlined the Super Bowl XLVI halftime show at Lucas Oil Stadium in Indianapolis, Indiana. Produced in collaboration with Cirque du Soleil and choreographer Jamie King, the performance featured guest appearances by LMFAO, Nicki Minaj, M.I.A. and CeeLo Green. The broadcast drew 114 million viewers, making it the most-watched Super Bowl halftime show at the time, surpassing the viewership of the game itself. Madonna primarily produced her twelfth studio album, MDNA, with Orbit and Martin Solveig. It was released on March 26, 2012, to generally favorable critical reception. MDNA was Madonna's first release under a three-album agreement with Interscope Records, signed as part of her 360 deal with Live Nation, which could not distribute recorded music.

MDNA became her fifth consecutive studio album to debut at number one on the Billboard 200. The lead single, "Give Me All Your Luvin'", became her record-extending thirty-eighth top-ten single on the Billboard Hot 100. She promoted the album with the MDNA Tour, which began in May 2012 and addressed themes such as violence, human rights, and politics. Grossing over $305 million from 88 sold-out shows, it was the tenth highest-grossing tour and made Madonna the first woman to pass $1 billion in touring revenue. Madonna collaborated with Steven Klein and directed a seventeen-minute film, secretprojectrevolution, which was released on BitTorrent in September 2013. With the film, she launched the Art for Freedom initiative, which promotes art and free speech to combat global persecution and injustice. The project's website garnered over 3,000 submissions by January 2014.

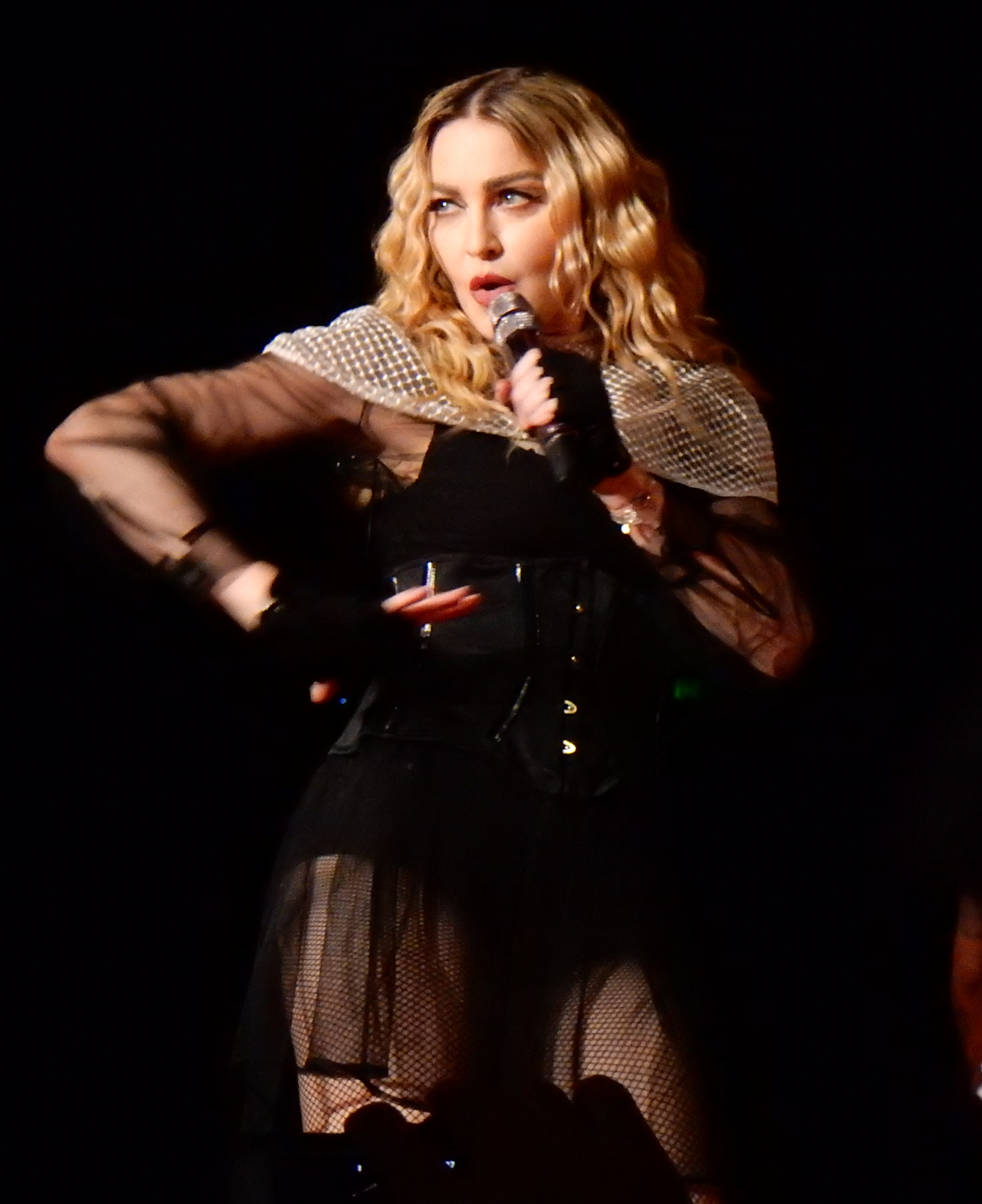
Madonna performing at the Rebel Heart Tour in 2016

By 2013, Madonna's Raising Malawi had built ten schools educating 4,000 children in Malawi worth of $400,000. In May 2014, she donated to her bankrupt hometown of Detroit, and that year launched her MDNA Skin care line in Tokyo. Madonna released her thirteenth studio album, Rebel Heart, on March 10, 2015, three months after thirteen demos leaked online. She collaborated with a large range of producers, including Avicii, Diplo, and Kanye West. The central theme of the album was introspection along with "genuine statements of personal and careerist reflection". Music critics responded positively towards Rebel Heart, calling it Madonna's best effort in a decade.

Madonna began her Rebel Heart Tour in September 2015, which visited North America, Europe, Asia, and Australia, and grossed $169.8 million from 82 shows. While touring, Madonna became involved in a legal dispute with Ritchie regarding custody of their son Rocco. The conflict arose when Rocco chose to remain in England with Ritchie rather than continue traveling with Madonna. Court proceedings were held in both New York and London, but after several hearings, Madonna withdrew her custody application and opted to settle the matter privately. In October 2016, Billboard named her its Woman of the Year. Her candid and outspoken speech addressing ageism and sexism garnered extensive media attention.

In November 2016, she performed an impromptu acoustic concert at Washington Square Park in support of Hillary Clinton's 2016 presidential campaign. After Donald Trump's election victory, Madonna delivered a speech at the 2017 Women's March on Washington, where a remark about "blowing up the White House" drew controversy. She later clarified that her comments had been taken out of context and emphasized that she was not advocating violence.

=== 2017–2021: Move to Lisbon and Madame X ===
In February 2017, Madonna adopted four-year-old twin sisters, Estere and Stella, from Malawi, and relocated to Lisbon, Portugal, later that year with her children. That July, she inaugurated the Mercy James Institute for Pediatric Surgery and Intensive Care in Malawi, a hospital established by her Raising Malawi foundation. Her live album Rebel Heart Tour was released in September 2017 and won Best Music Video for Western Artists at the 32nd Japan Gold Disc Awards. That same month, she launched her skincare brand MDNA Skin in selected US stores. Earlier in the year, the auction house Gotta Have Rock and Roll attempted to sell Madonna's personal items, including letters from Tupac Shakur. Although she sought legal action to halt the sale, the court ruled in favor of art dealer Darlene Lutz due to a 2004 agreement authorizing the sale of the items.

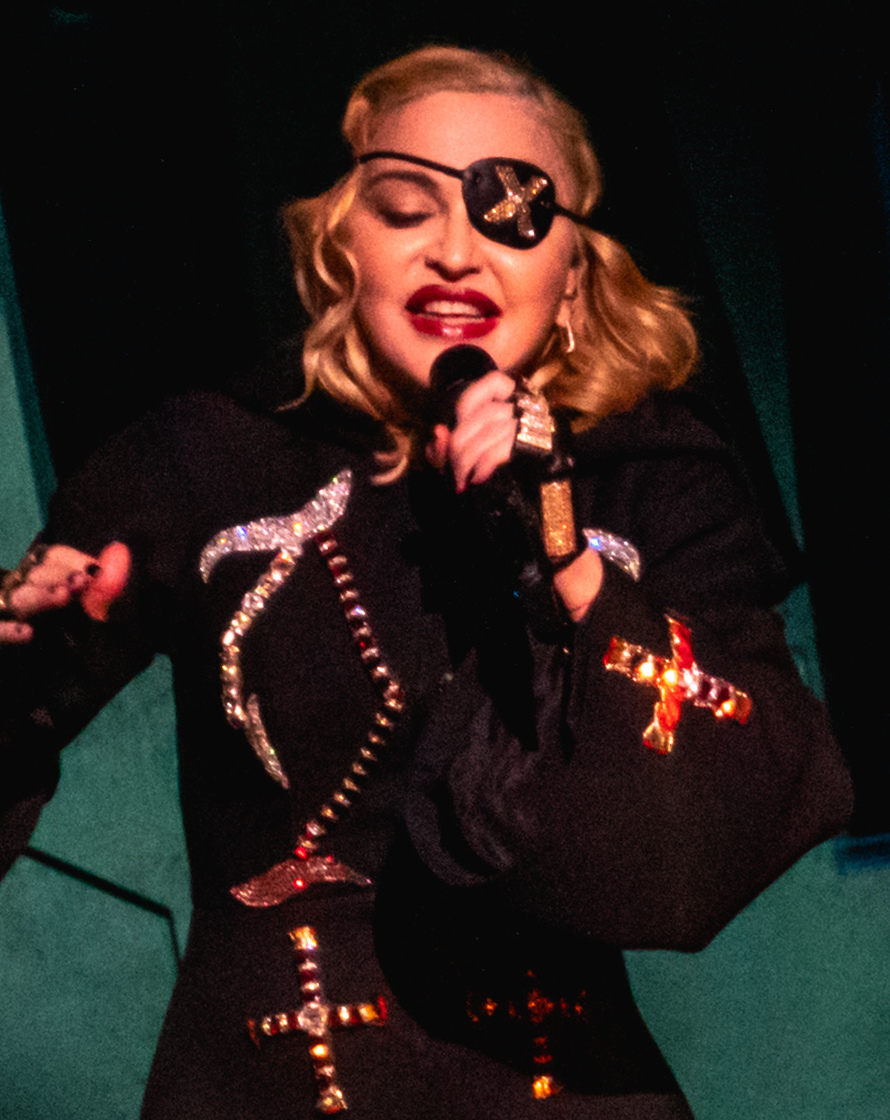
Madonna performing at the Madame X Tour in 2020

While residing in Lisbon, Madonna met Portuguese musician Dino D'Santiago, who introduced her to local artists performing fado, morna, and samba music. She frequently attended their informal "living room sessions", which inspired her fourteenth studio album, Madame X. The album was released on June 14, 2019, and Madonna produced it with various musicians, primarily her longtime collaborator Mirwais and Mike Dean. Madame X debuted at number one on the Billboard 200, her ninth to do so. Its four singles—"Medellín", "Crave", "I Rise" and "I Don't Search I Find"—each reached number one on the Billboard Dance Club Songs chart, further extending her record for the most chart-topping entries.

Madonna appeared as the interval act at the Eurovision Song Contest 2019 and performed "Like a Prayer", and then "Future" with rapper Quavo. Her Madame X Tour, an all-theater concert series held in select cities across North America and Europe, began in September 2019 and grossed over $51.4 million in revenue. That December, Madonna began a relationship with dancer Ahlamalik Williams, who had previously joined her Rebel Heart Tour in 2015. The tour later faced multiple cancellations due to Madonna's recurring knee injury and concluded prematurely on March 8, 2020, after the French government prohibited large gatherings because of the COVID-19 pandemic. Later that month, she drew criticism for posting a now-deleted video on Instagram and Twitter; in it, she sat naked amid rose petals and candles, calling COVID-19 "the great equalizer" that makes everyone equal regardless of status.

In April 2020, Madonna announced financial contributions to the COVID-19 Therapeutics Accelerator, led by the Bill & Melinda Gates Foundation, the Wellcome Trust, and Mastercard, and donated an additional $1 million to vaccine research. A month later, Madonna revealed she had tested positive for coronavirus antibodies. She and Missy Elliott contributed guest vocals to Dua Lipa's single "Levitating", featured on Lipa's 2020 remix album Club Future Nostalgia. Madonna then began developing a biographical film about her life, which she planned to direct. Screenwriters Erin Cressida Wilson and Diablo Cody worked on the script at different stages, and actress Julia Garner was cast in the lead role before the project was postponed, and ultimately scrapped over budgeting and casting disagreements with Universal Pictures. In October 2021, Madonna released Madame X, a documentary film about her concert tour of the same name, through Paramount+.

=== 2022–present: Remix albums, EP, and Confessions II ===
In August 2021, coinciding with her 63rd birthday, Madonna announced her return to Warner Records—the rebranded successor to Warner Bros. Records—in a global partnership. The deal granted the label rights to her entire recorded music catalog, including her three most recent albums originally released under Interscope. As part of the agreement, she began a series of catalog reissues in 2022 to mark the fortieth anniversary of her recording career. The remix album Finally Enough Love: 50 Number Ones was released in August, following a 16-track abridged edition made available for streaming two months prior. Featuring her 50 number-one songs on Billboard's Dance Club Songs chart, the album celebrated Madonna's long-standing connection to dance music and became her 23rd top-ten entry on the Billboard 200.

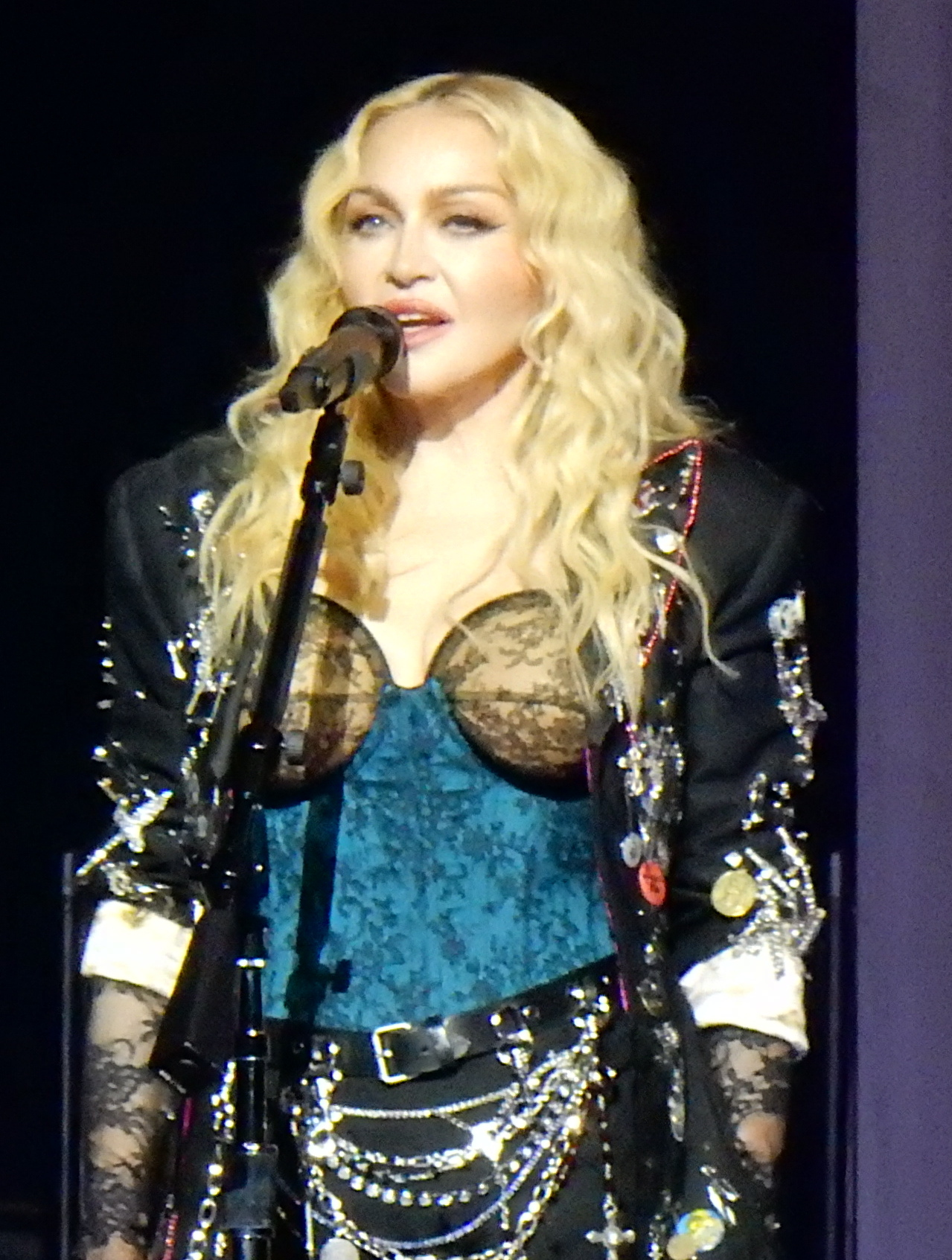
Madonna performing during the Celebration Tour in 2023

Between 2022 and 2023, Madonna issued several standalone singles, including "Back That Up to the Beat", a previously unreleased demo from the Rebel Heart sessions that went viral on social media. She also contributed to three tracks on Christine and the Queens' album Paranoïa, Angels, True Love (2023), and collaborated with the Weeknd and Playboi Carti on the single "Popular", featured on the soundtrack to the television drama The Idol. In January 2023, Madonna announced the Celebration Tour, her first greatest hits concert tour. The tour was to begin in July, but a month prior, she was hospitalized after being found unresponsive at her New York City residence. She spent five days in intensive care and was placed in a medically induced coma for 48 hours due to a serious bacterial infection following a low-grade fever.

Following her recovery, the Celebration Tour commenced in October 2023 in London, receiving widespread critical acclaim. It concluded the following May with a free concert on Copacabana Beach in Rio de Janeiro, which drew an audience of 1.6 million—setting records for both the largest standalone concert in history and the highest attendance ever for a female artist at the time. The tour grossed over $225 million across eighty shows, making Madonna the first woman to surpass $100 million in earnings from six separate concert tours. Around this time, Madonna experienced the deaths of several family members, beginning with that of her eldest brother, Anthony, in February 2023. Her younger brother, Christopher, died in October 2024, two weeks after that of their stepmother, Joan.

In 2025, Madonna released the remix album Veronica Electronica and the extended play Bedtime Stories: The Untold Chapter, both of which contain previously unreleased demos. In January 2026, she became the face of The One, a Dolce & Gabbana fragrance. Madonna covered Patty Pravo's 1968 single "La bambola" as part of the campaign, which included a short film and photographs. In April, she joined Sabrina Carpenter at the Coachella festival to perform "Vogue", "Like a Prayer", and a new duet, "Bring Your Love". Madonna reunited with Stuart Price for her fifteenth studio album, Confessions II, which was released on July 3, 2026. A follow-up to Confessions on a Dance Floor (2005), it was critically acclaimed and debuted atop the Billboard 200, her tenth album to do so. Its singles comprised "Bring Your Love", "Love Sensation", and "Danceteria"; the former debuted at number 74 on the Billboard Hot 100.

A short musical film titled Confessions II accompanied the album and premiered in June. After a surprise concert in Times Square in New York City that month, she released a FIFA version of Confessions II track "Read My Lips" with Colombian singer Feid, included on the bonus edition of the Official FIFA World Cup 2026 Album. On July 19, Madonna performed "Music" and elements of "Danceteria" during the 2026 FIFA World Cup final halftime show, which took place at the New York New Jersey Stadium. In August, she performed at the AFAS Live in Amsterdam as a part of WorldPride during the Pride Amsterdam and was joined onstage by Kylie Minogue to sing a new version of "Love Sensation". The remix with Minogue received a single release that became Madonna's 65th UK top-ten single.

Madonna received thirteen nominations for the 2026 MTV Video Music Awards, tying the record for the most nominations for an artist in a single year. She won seven of her nominations, including Best Album and Artist of the Year. Madonna also opened the awards ceremony performing "Bring Your Love" with Carpenter and a "Danceteria" remix featuring Charli XCX.

== Artistry ==
=== Influences ===
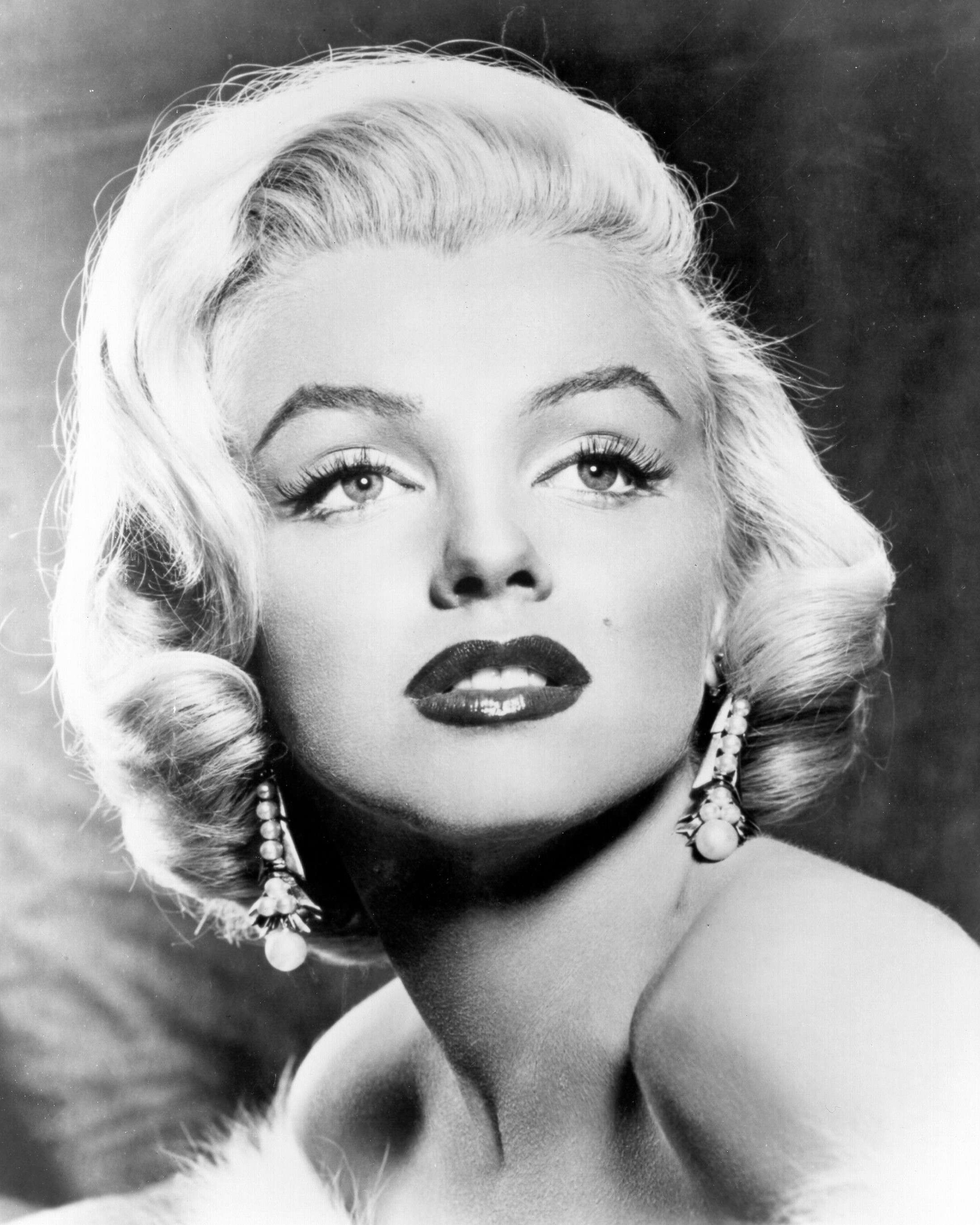
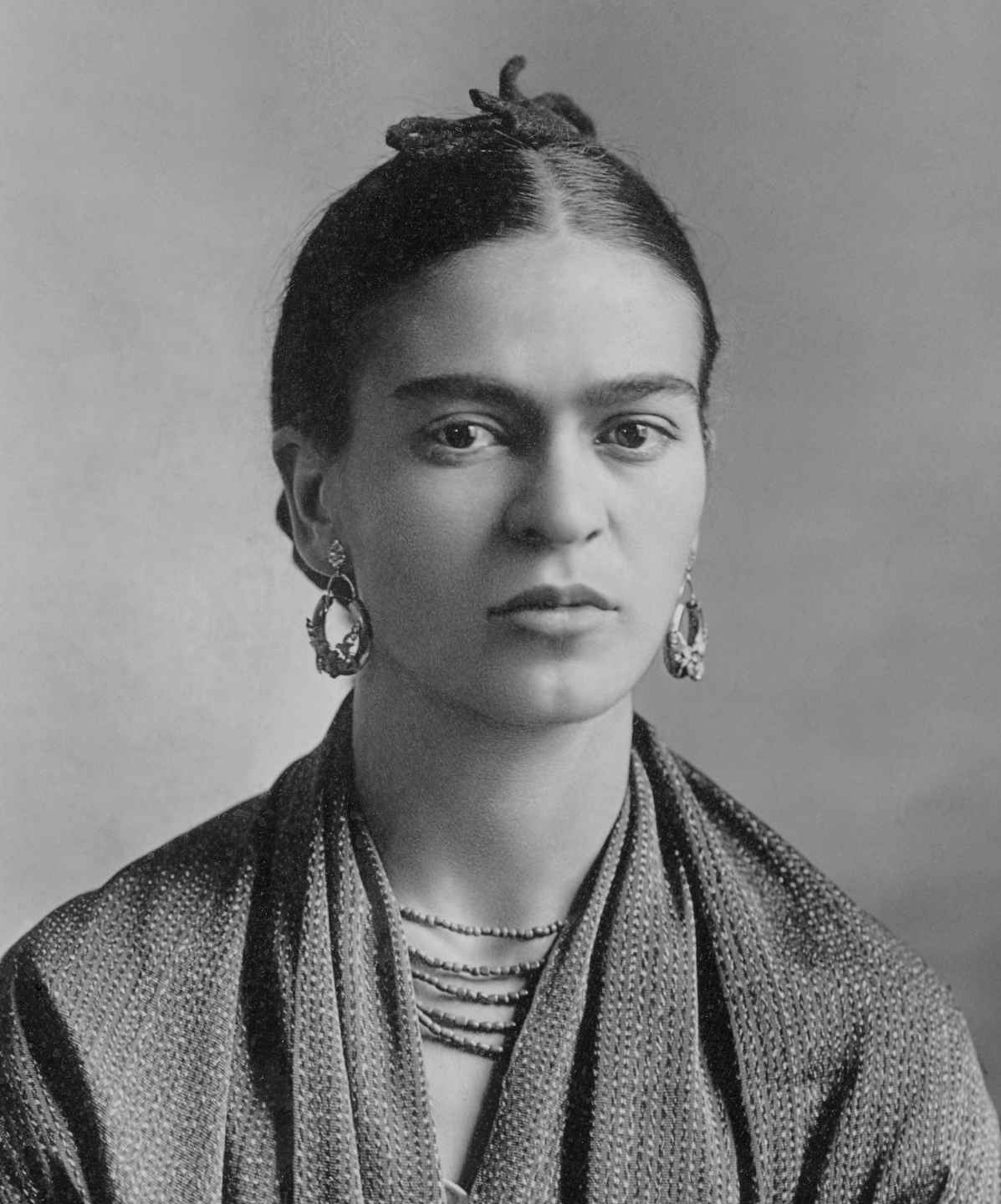
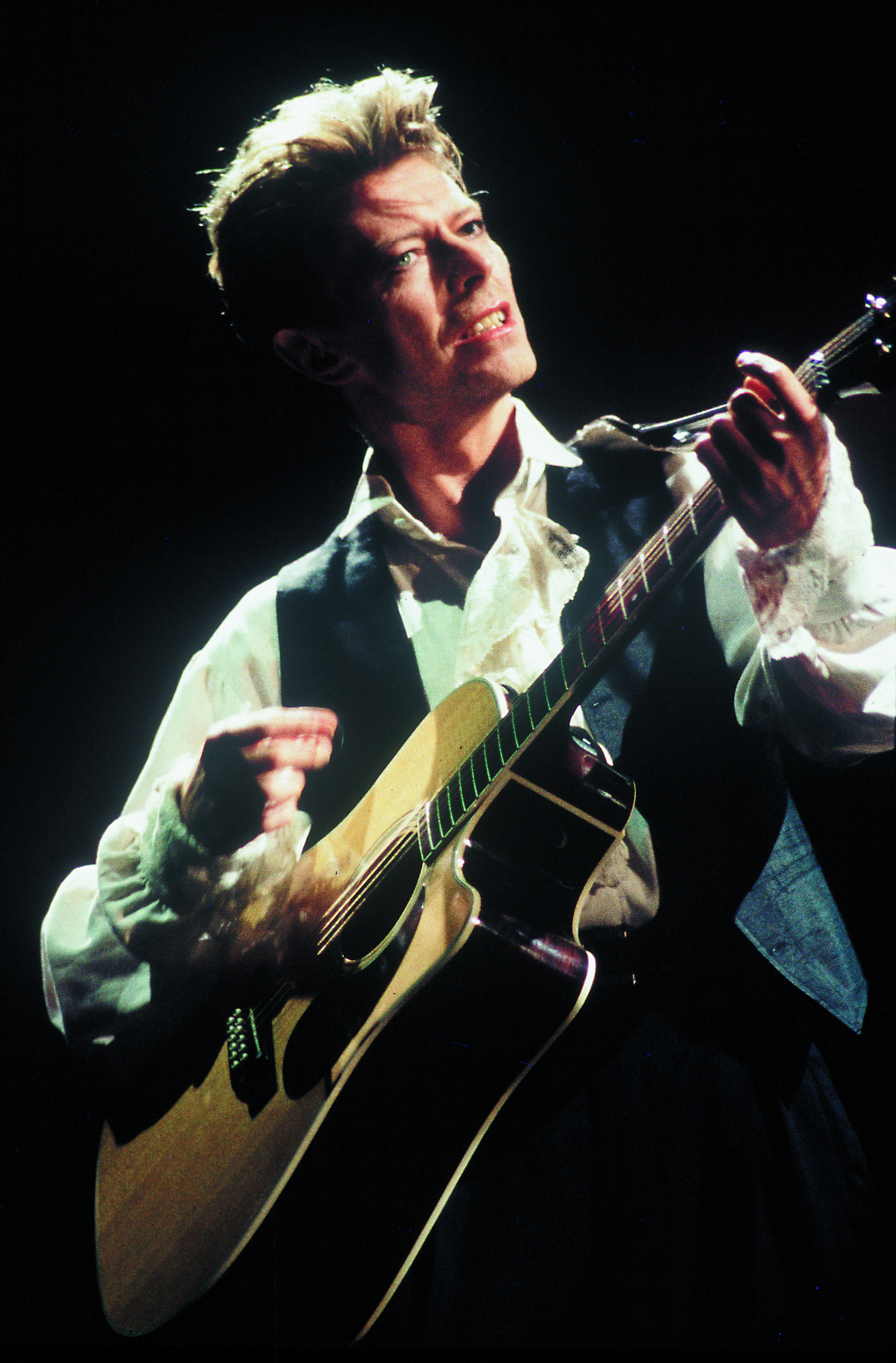
Madonna has been inspired by film stars such as Marilyn Monroe (left), artists such as Frida Kahlo (center), and musicians like David Bowie (right).

When initially starting her career, Madonna's primary musical inspirations were Debbie Harry of Blondie and David Bowie, whose Diamond Dogs Tour concert was the first performance she ever attended. Madonna has cited Nancy Sinatra as one of her idols and said that her song "These Boots Are Made for Walkin'" (1965) left a strong impression on her. As a young woman, she sought to expand her artistry through literature, art, and music, developing a particular interest in classical compositions. She identified Baroque as her preferred style and admired Wolfgang Amadeus Mozart and Frédéric Chopin, praising the "feminine quality" in their work. Among Madonna's other principal influences are Chrissie Hynde, Aretha Franklin, Patti Smith, Karen Carpenter, the Supremes, Joni Mitchell, and Led Zeppelin, as well as dancers Rudolf Nureyev and Martha Graham, the latter of which she considers one of her biggest mentors.

Madonna has also been inspired by the works of American writer James Baldwin. As a child, Madonna drew inspiration from Hollywood actresses such as Carole Lombard, Judy Holliday, and Marilyn Monroe, admiring their blend of femininity, strength, and sex appeal, and remarking that she "saw [her]self in them". Her music video for "Material Girl" recreated Monroe's performance of "Diamonds Are a Girl's Best Friend" from the film Gentlemen Prefer Blondes (1953). In preparation for her role in Who's That Girl, Madonna studied the 1930s screwball comedies of Lombard, whose style she sought to emulate. The visual concept for her "Express Yourself" (1989) video drew influence from Fritz Lang's silent film Metropolis (1927), while "Vogue" paid homage to the golden age of Hollywood glamor, referencing the photography of Horst P. Horst and channeling the screen presence of Marlene Dietrich, Lombard, and Rita Hayworth.

Historians, musicians, and anthropologists trace her influences—from African American gospel music to Japanese fashion, Middle Eastern spirituality to feminist art history—and the ways she borrows, adapts, and interprets them.

— National Geographic Society on Madonna's influences.

Madonna also drew inspiration from the visual arts, particularly Mexican painter Frida Kahlo. The music video for "Bedtime Story" (1995) incorporated imagery influenced by the works of Kahlo and Remedios Varo. A collector of Tamara de Lempicka's Art Deco paintings, Madonna has featured them throughout her music videos and stage productions. Her video for "Hollywood" (2003) paid tribute to the photography of Guy Bourdin, though it later prompted a lawsuit filed by Bourdin's son over the unauthorized use of his father's images. The sadomasochistic motifs in pop artist Andy Warhol's underground films were echoed in the videos for "Erotica" and "Deeper and Deeper".

Madonna's Catholic upbringing has remained a consistent influence throughout her career, from her use of the rosary as a fashion piece to her musical inputs, including albums such as Like a Prayer (1989). In 2011, she attended meetings and services at an Opus Dei center, a Catholic institution that promotes sanctity through daily life. In a 2015 interview with Rolling Stone, Madonna remarked that she has always felt an "inexplicable connection" to Catholicism and stated that it consistently manifests throughout her work.

=== Musical style and composition ===
I was in Barney's (store) getting a tie for the Grammys and I saw Madonna there. I introduced myself, and I told her that she didn't get the credit she deserved as a songwriter. Which is true, but it's also an awkward thing to tell a huge superstar! She was very cool and gracious. I ended up getting a meeting with her in L.A. a few weeks later.

— Rick Nowels, on co-writing with Madonna.

Madonna's work has been the subject of critical analysis and debate. Robert M. Grant, author of Contemporary Strategy Analysis (2005), observed that her musical career is a continual process of experimentation with new sounds and images. In Pop Goes the Decade: The Eighties, Thomas Harrison described her as "an artist who pushed the boundaries" of what a female performer could achieve, both visually and lyrically. Professor Santiago Fouz-Hernández observed that, while not possessing a particularly powerful or wide-ranging voice, Madonna expanded her artistic range through diverse musical, lyrical, and visual styles, "all with the intention of presenting herself as a mature musician".

Rolling Stone included Madonna at number 36 on its list of the "100 Greatest Artists of All Time" (2004). She has managed all aspects of her career; she writes and produces most of her recordings. Her desire for control in creative decisions was evident as early as her debut album, during which she reportedly disagreed with producer Reggie Lucas over the final mixes. Warner Bros. Records later allowed her to produce her third studio album independently. According to Stan Hawkins, author of Settling the Pop Score, Madonna is among the few female artists to have entered the male-dominated space of music production, saying that she is aware of the historical exclusion of women and actively "has set out to change this". Producer Stuart Price similarly remarked that "you don't produce Madonna, you collaborate with her [...] she has her vision and knows how to get it". Although referred to by the media and workers as a "control freak", Madonna has stated that she values creative input from those she works with. She further explained:

I like to have control over most of the things in my career but I'm not a tyrant. I don't have to have it on my album that it's written, arranged, produced, directed, and stars Madonna. To me, to have total control means you can lose objectivity. What I like is to be surrounded by really talented, intelligent people that you can trust. And ask them for their advice and get their input.

Madonna developed her early songwriting skills while performing with the Breakfast Club in 1979, and was the sole writer of five tracks on her debut studio album. As a songwriter, Madonna has registered more than 300 works with the American Society of Composers, Authors and Publishers, including 18 written entirely by herself. Rolling Stone deemed her "an exemplary songwriter with a gift for hooks and indelible lyrics", and said that her compositions, though shaped by collaborations with producers across various genres, are consistently shaped by "her own sensibility and inflected with autobiographical detail". Patrick Leonard, who co-wrote many of her songs, lauded her grasp of melodic structure and said that "many times she's singing notes that no one would've thought of but her". Spin's Barry Walters similarly credited her songwriting for the consistency of her music. Madonna was nominated for induction into the Songwriters Hall of Fame in 2014, 2016, and 2017, and was ranked number 56 on Rolling Stone's list of the "100 Greatest Songwriters of All Time" (2015).

"Live to Tell" (1986)
Madonna wrote the lyrics and some of the melodies to "Live to Tell", an adult contemporary ballad that some critics considered her first reinvention musically.

"Ray of Light" (1998)
An uptempo electronic dance song, "Ray of Light" showcases Madonna's post-Evita upper vocal register.

Madonna's discography is primarily categorized as pop, dance, and electronic. Her earliest work began with rock-oriented projects through the bands Breakfast Club and Emmy. With the latter, she recorded tracks that reflected the punk rock style of the early 1980s. She abandoned rock before signing with Gotham Records, which dropped her because of their dissatisfaction with her shift to funk. In his book American Pop, Arie Kaplan referred to Madonna as "a pioneer" of dance-pop. Fouz-Hernández further observed that Madonna's consistent use of dance idioms and her connection with gay and sexually liberated audiences have often been undervalued in contrast to the perceived authenticity of rock and roll, noting that her music "refuses to be defined by narrow boundaries of gender, sexuality, or genre".

The sentimental ballad "Live to Tell" and its parent album True Blue (1986) are regarded as Madonna's first significant musical reinvention. PopMatters critic Peter Piatkowski described the song as a "deliberate effort to present Madonna as a mature and serious artist". Although she continued to record ballads alongside her more upbeat material, some of her albums, such as Madonna (1983) and Confessions on a Dance Floor (2005), are composed entirely of dance tracks. With Ray of Light (1998), critics credited her with popularizing electronica and integrating it into mainstream pop music. Her other stylistic departures include 1930s big-band jazz on I'm Breathless (1990); R&B arrangements on Bedtime Stories (1994); operatic show tunes on Evita (1996); guitar-based folktronica on American Life (2003); and multilingual world music on Madame X (2019).

=== Voice and instruments ===
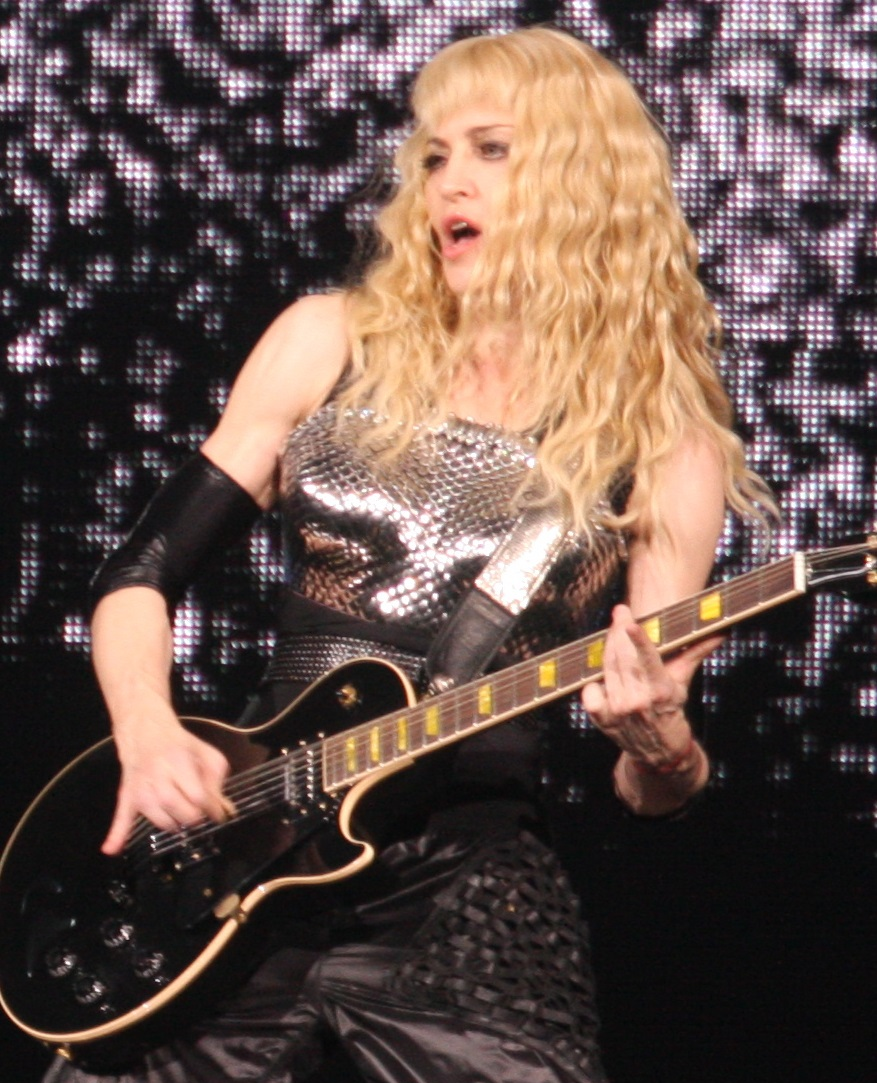
Madonna playing the guitar riff of "A New Level" by heavy metal band Pantera during the 2008 Sticky & Sweet Tour

Madonna possesses a mezzo-soprano vocal range and is self-conscious about her singing voice. Mark Bego, author of Madonna: Blonde Ambition, described her as "the perfect vocalist for lighter-than-air songs" despite not being a "heavyweight talent". According to Tony Sclafani of MSNBC, her vocal delivery reflects her "rock roots", explaining that, unlike most pop singers who perform songs "straight", Madonna incorporates subtext, irony, aggression, and other vocal idiosyncrasies similar to that of John Lennon and Bob Dylan. In her early recordings, Madonna employed a bright, girlish timbre that she later tried to abandon after critics compared her voice to "Minnie Mouse on helium". While filming Evita (1996), she took voice training, which expanded her vocal versatility. Of the experience, she said, "I studied with a vocal coach for Evita and realized there was a whole piece of my voice I wasn't using. Before, I just believed I had a really limited range and was going to make the most of it."

Madonna plays several musical instruments. She first learned to play the piano as a child. During the late 1970s, she was taught drums and guitar by her then-boyfriend Dan Gilroy, later joining his band, the Breakfast Club, as a drummer. Madonna then played guitar with the group Emmy. After her commercial breakthrough, she rarely performed instruments publicly until 2000, though she was credited with playing the cowbell on Madonna (1983) and the synthesizer on Like a Prayer (1989). In 1999, she undertook three months of violin training to prepare for a role as a violin teacher in the film Music of the Heart (1999), but withdrew from the project before filming. She returned to performing with the guitar during promotion for Music (2000) with guidance from guitarist Monte Pittman to improve her technique. Since then, Madonna has featured guitar performances in her studio recordings and concert tours. She was nominated for the Les Paul Horizon Award at the 2002 Orville H. Gibson Guitar Awards.

=== Music videos and performances ===
In The Madonna Companion, biographers Allen Metz and Carol Benson observed that Madonna used MTV and the music video to leverage her popularity and enhance her recordings more effectively than any other contemporary pop artist. They noticed that many of her songs are closely tied to the imagery of their accompanying videos. Cultural critic Mark C. Taylor described the postmodern art form par excellence as the music video, declaring Madonna its "reigning queen" in his book Nots (1993). He argued that "the most remarkable creation of MTV is Madonna", and that public reactions to her provocative videos were "predictably contradictory". Metz and Benson said that critical and public discussions surrounding some of her most controversial songs have often focused more on their videos and cultural impact than on the songs themselves. According to Morton, "artistically, Madonna's songwriting is often overshadowed by her striking pop videos". Madonna was ranked as the greatest music video artist by MTV in 2003 and Billboard in 2020.

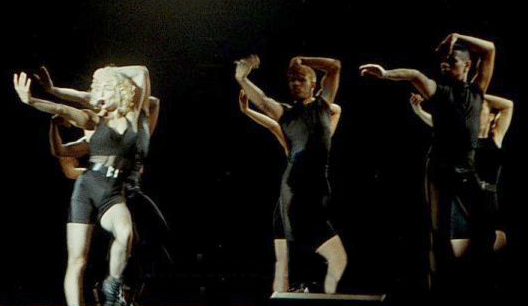
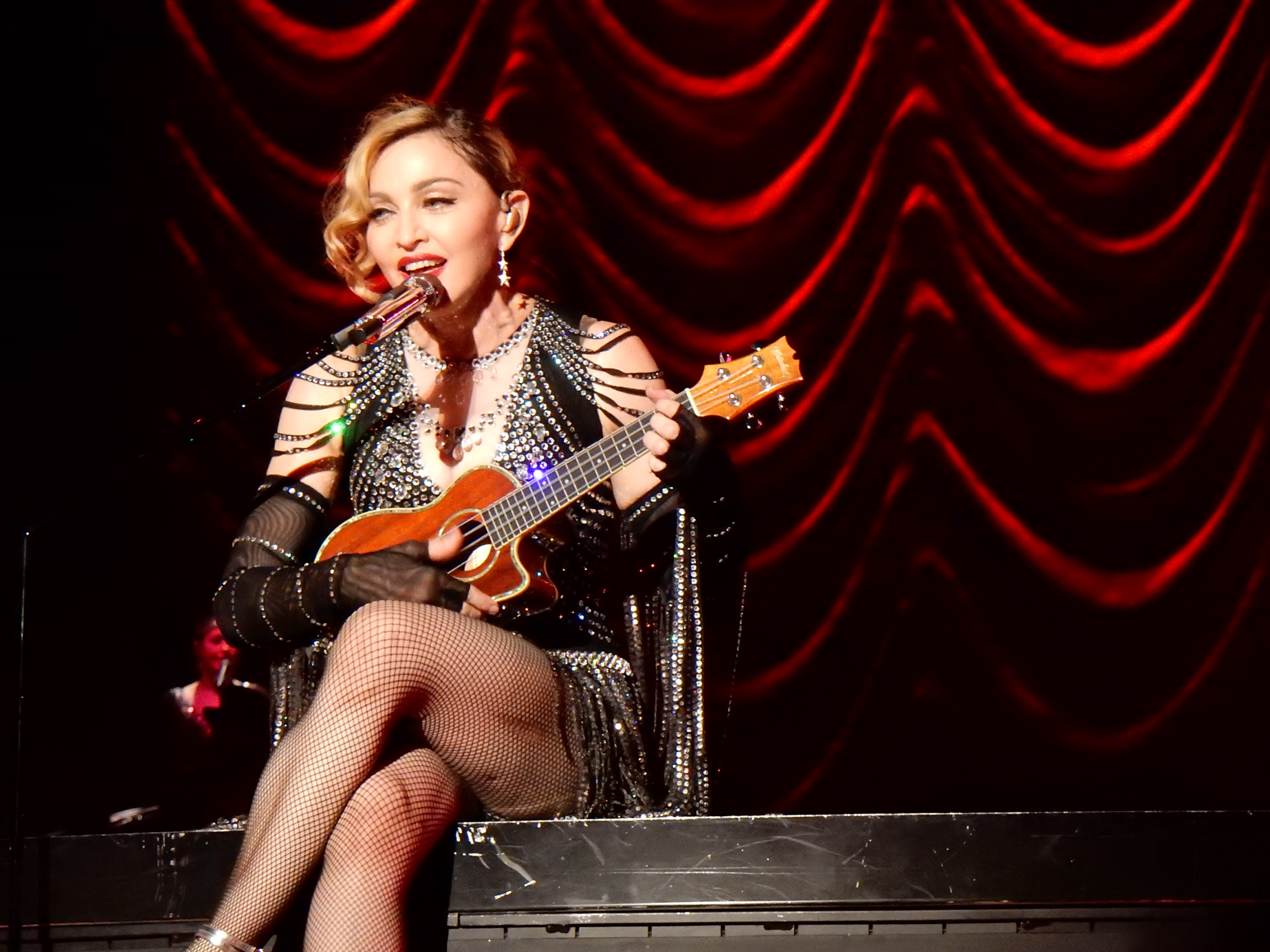
Madonna's live performances vary from choreographed routines such as voguing (top) to stripped-down ones with only a ukulele (bottom).

Madonna's early music videos fused American and Hispanic street style with flamboyant glamor. Through the visuals, she introduced her avant-garde Downtown Manhattan fashion sensibility to an American audience. The recurring use of Hispanic cultural motifs and Catholic symbolism continued into the True Blue era. According to author Douglas Kellner, Madonna's embrace of "multiculturalism" and her "culturally transgressive moves" proved to be effective in appealing to a wide range of young audiences. Scholars have noted that through her visual narratives, Madonna often subverted traditional gender norms by symbolically reversing male dominance. Her use of religious and racial imagery was prominent in the music video for "Like a Prayer", which depicted scenes of an African-American church choir, Madonna's attraction to a black saint statue, and her performance before burning crosses.

Madonna's acting has often been met with negative reviews from film critics. Biographer Andrew Morton noted that Madonna publicly dismissed the criticism. Following the critical and commercial failure of Swept Away (2002), she vowed never to act in another film. In a retrospective of her screen career titled Body of Work (2016) at New York's Metrograph, The Guardian's Nigel M. Smith argued that Madonna's struggles in film were largely due to the lack of quality roles available to her, stating that she could "steal a scene for all the right reasons". Her concert tours often re-create her music videos; author Elin Diamond said that the ability to reproduce scenes from Madonna's videos in a live setting enhances the realism of the videos, arguing that "her live performances have become the means by which mediatized representations are naturalized".

According to Taraborrelli, Madonna's concerts, which feature multimedia elements, advanced technology, and elaborate sound design, function as "extravagant show piece[s]" and "walking art show[s]". Chris Nelson of The New York Times observed that artists like Madonna redefined standards of live performance with concerts "that included not only elaborate costumes and precision-timed pyrotechnics but also highly athletic dancing"—often at the expense of live vocals. A writer for the Orlando Sentinel said that she later restructured her stage shows to balance choreography and live singing by remaining stationary during vocally demanding sections while delegating more complex dance sequences to her backup performers. To support simultaneous singing and movement, Madonna began using a hands-free radio-frequency headset microphone, secured over the head or ears with a boom extending to the mouth.

== Legacy ==
She's a major historical figure and when she passes, the retrospectives will loom larger and larger in history.

— Academic Camille Paglia on Madonna (2017).

Madonna's profound influence on popular music has led critics and scholars to refer to her as the "Queen of Pop". Her legacy transcends music and has been examined by sociologists, historians, media scholars, and cultural critics, contributing to the development of Madonna studies, a subfield of American cultural studies. Rolling Stone noted that Madonna's omnipresence across television, radio, magazines, and bookstores was an unparalleled pop dynamic not seen since the Beatles. The Daily Telegraph remarked that Madonna "changed the world's social history", with scholar Diane Pecknold noticing that "nearly every poll of the greatest or most influential figures in popular culture includes Madonna". Madonna has frequently appeared in rankings of the greatest and most influential musicians.

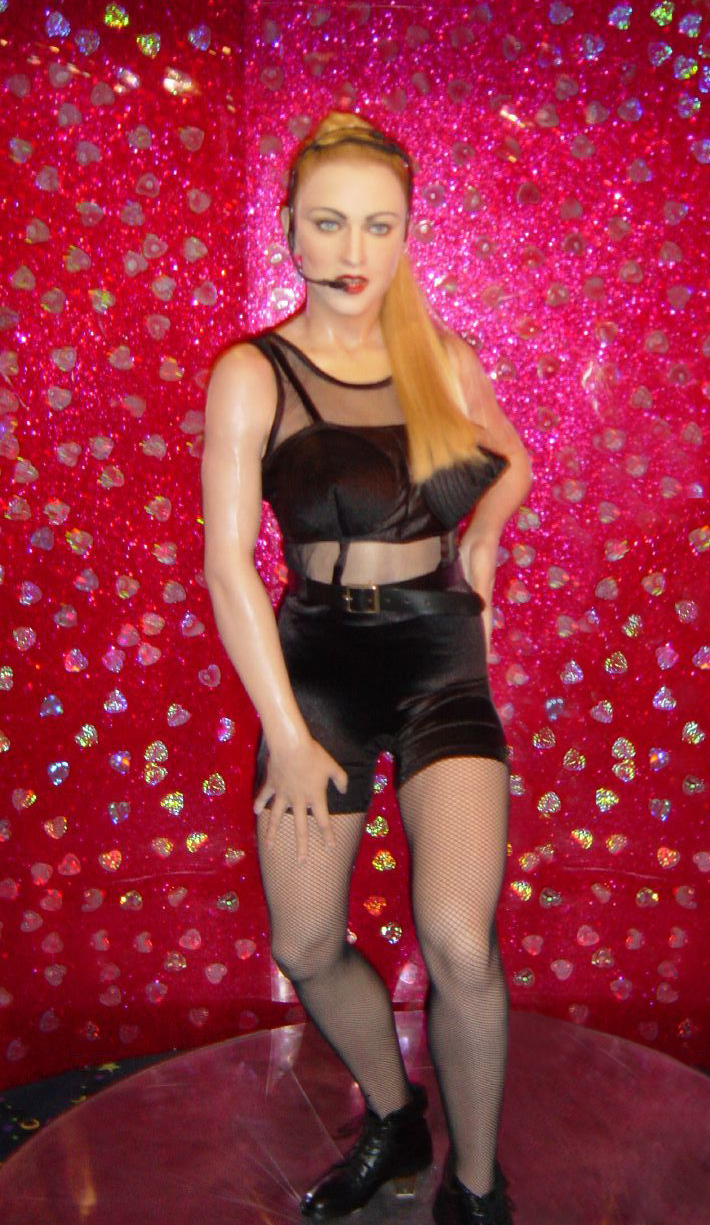
Wax figure of Madonna at Madame Tussauds museum in Hong Kong

The Rock and Roll Hall of Fame wrote that Madonna helped dissolve gender boundaries. Spin wrote in 2020 that the title "Queen of Pop" scarcely captures her impact, stating that "she is Pop" and that she established "the blueprint for what a pop star should be". Sclafani argued that before Madonna, most major music stars were male rock artists, and that her influence helped usher in an era where female solo performers became far more prominent in mainstream popular music. Many female artists in the 21st century—including Britney Spears, Beyoncé, Rihanna, Katy Perry, and Lady Gaga—have cited Madonna as an influence on their careers. Madonna has also influenced male artists, inspiring rock frontmen Liam Gallagher of Oasis and Chester Bennington of Linkin Park to become musicians.

Madonna's use of sexual imagery has ignited widespread discussions regarding sexuality and feminism. Media scholar John Fiske remarked that the empowerment Madonna conveys is closely tied to the gratification of asserting control over self-definition, sexuality, and social dynamics. As discussed in Doing Gender in Media, Art and Culture (2009), Madonna's status as a female celebrity, performer, and pop icon continues to challenge and reinterpret established feminist discourses. According to lesbian feminist Sheila Jeffreys, Madonna embodies what Monique Wittig terms "the category of sex" as a site of power, while deliberately embracing the performance of women's assigned sexual labor. Similarly, communication scholar Sut Jhally has described her as "an almost sacred feminist icon".

Writers and scholars have also highlighted Madonna's engagement with LGBTQ, Latino, and Black culture. Matt Cain argued that her work helped bring marginalized groups and cultures into mainstream popular culture. One author remarked that "by making culture generally available, Madonna becomes the culture of all social classes". Canadian scholar Karlene Faith similarly said that Madonna's peculiarity lies in her ability to "move freely across diverse cultural terrains", describing her as a "cult figure" within multiple self-sustaining subcultures even as she achieved mainstream success. She is often regarded as a gay icon, with GLAAD president Sarah Kate Ellis affirming that Madonna "always has and always will be the LGBTQ community's greatest ally", and The Advocate characterizing her as "the greatest gay icon".

Madonna has also been studied as a business figure and entrepreneur; she amassed over $1.2 billion in sales during the first decade of her career. According to Gini Gorlinski in The 100 Most Influential Musicians of All Time (2010), Madonna's authority and autonomy within the entertainment industry were unprecedented for a woman at the time. Scholars at the London Business School described her as a "dynamic entrepreneur" whose success model is worth emulating, identifying her vision of success, understanding of the music industry, ability to recognize her own performance limits, work ethic, and adaptability as the basis for her commercial achievements. Morton called Madonna "opportunistic, manipulative, and ruthless—someone who will not stop until she achieves her goals".

Madonna has been criticized from social, moral and political perspectives. Scholars have challenged her use of racialized and minority cultures and argued that her privileged position does little to aid the communities whose imagery she adopts. Madonna has been linked to terms like "Madonna-economy" and "Madonnization", shorthand for homogenizing American mass culture similar to that of McDonaldization and Cocacolonization. Internationally, political and religious commentators have sometimes cast her as a symbol of Western cultural hegemony or "cultural terrorism", associating her with Americanization and the erosion of local traditions. Conservative groups, parental organizations and some philosophers have further criticized her as emblematic of mass culture's corrupting influence on youth, fueling moral panics over sexuality, religion and the commercialization of popular music.

== Achievements ==
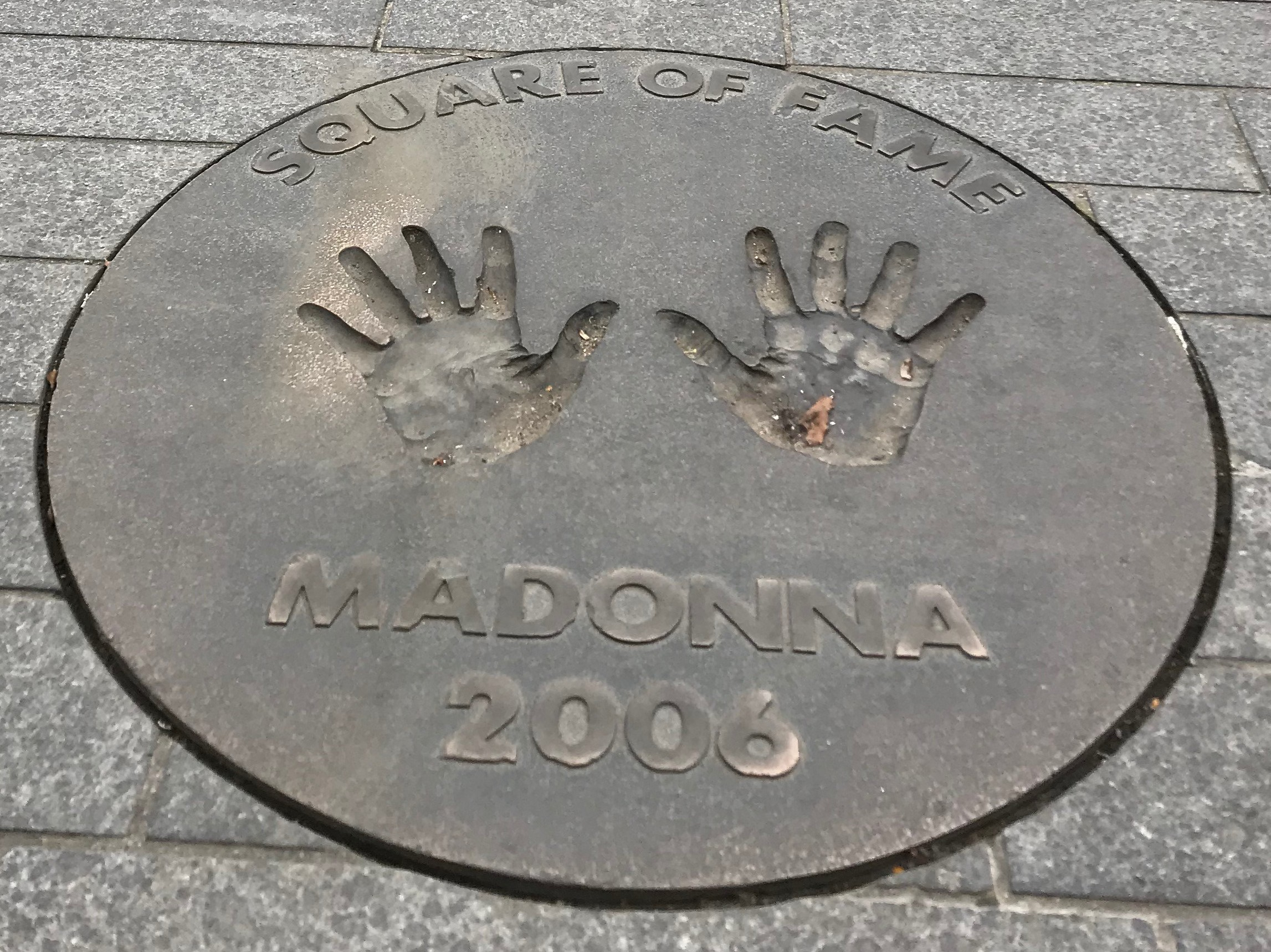
Madonna was the first person to be inducted into the Wembley Square of Fame in London.

Forbes estimated Madonna's net worth at $850 million as of 2025, making her one of the wealthiest musicians in the world. She became Forbes's annual highest-paid female musician 11 times across the 1980s, 1990s, 2000s, and 2010s. Madonna is the best-selling female music artist of all time, (Note: Since 1998, Guinness World Records has recognized Madonna as the best-selling female music artist. In 2006, the International Federation of the Phonographic Industry (IFPI) officially announced that Madonna had sold over 200 million copies of her albums alone worldwide. Since then, her total record sales have varied from 300 million to 400 million.) and has eighteen albums certified multi-platinum in multiple countries. (Note: Madonna has 12 albums certified multi-platinum by the RIAA. Her other albums certified multi-platinum outside the US are Who's That Girl (1987), GHV2 (2001), Confessions on a Dance Floor (2005), Hard Candy (2008), Celebration (2009), and MDNA (2012).) According to the Recording Industry Association of America (RIAA), she is the best-selling female rock artist of the 20th century and the fourth highest-certified female artist in the US, with 65.5 million certified album-equivalent units.

Madonna has generated over US$1.6 billion from ticket sales of her concert tours throughout her career. According to Billboard Boxscore, she had become the highest-grossing female touring artist for 19 years (2004–2023), until being overtaken by Taylor Swift. Madonna has won seven Grammy Awards and twenty-seven MTV Video Music Awards, including the 1986 Video Vanguard Award for which she became the first female recipient. In Japan, the world's second largest market, Madonna has received seventeen Gold Disc Awards from the Recording Industry Association of Japan, including the most Artist of the Year wins by a solo artist (five). Madonna became the first artist to be named the "Greatest Pop Star" of the year twice by Billboard (1985 and 1989). Like a Prayer (1989), The Immaculate Collection (1990), Ray of Light (1998), and Music (2000) have each been included among Rolling Stone's list titled "500 Greatest Albums of All Time".

Throughout her career, Madonna has had twelve songs top the charts in the United States, thirteen in the United Kingdom, twenty-four in Canada, (Note: Madonna has more number-one singles than any other act in Canadian music history, with 18 singles during the RPM era, two singles during the Canadian Hot 100 era, and four singles between 2000 and 2007 on the Canadian Singles Chart.) and eleven in Australia. At the 40th anniversary of the GfK Media Control Charts, Madonna was ranked as the most successful singles artist in German chart history. According to Billboard, she was the most successful solo artist on the Billboard Hot 100 by 2021—second overall behind the Beatles—and remains the most successful dance club artist in history. She has achieved 38 top-ten singles on the Billboard Hot 100, the most of any artist of the pre-streaming era. A dominant physical singles seller, she has the most chart-topping hits on the Hot 100 Singles Sales (16) and the Dance Singles Sales (33) of any artist. With 50 Dance Club Songs chart-toppers, Madonna became the artist with the most number ones on any single Billboard chart.

== Discography ==
- Madonna (1983)
- Like a Virgin (1984)
- True Blue (1986)
- Like a Prayer (1989)
- Erotica (1992)
- Bedtime Stories (1994)
- Ray of Light (1998)
- Music (2000)
- American Life (2003)
- Confessions on a Dance Floor (2005)
- Hard Candy (2008)
- MDNA (2012)
- Rebel Heart (2015)
- Madame X (2019)
- Confessions II (2026)

== Filmography ==
Films starred in

- Desperately Seeking Susan (1985)
- A Certain Sacrifice (1985)
- Shanghai Surprise (1986)
- Who's That Girl (1987)
- Bloodhounds of Broadway (1989)
- Dick Tracy (1990)
- Madonna: Truth or Dare (1991)
- A League of Their Own (1992)
- Body of Evidence (1993)
- Dangerous Game (1993)
- Four Rooms (1995)
- Evita (1996)
- The Next Best Thing (2000)
- Swept Away (2002)
- Die Another Day (2002)
- I'm Going to Tell You a Secret (2005)
- Arthur and the Invisibles (2006)
- Madame X (2021)
- Confessions II (2026)

Films directed

- Filth and Wisdom (2008)
- W.E. (2011)
- secretprojectrevolution (2013)

== Tours ==
- The Virgin Tour (1985)
- Who's That Girl World Tour (1987)
- Blond Ambition World Tour (1990)
- The Girlie Show (1993)
- Drowned World Tour (2001)
- Re-Invention World Tour (2004)
- Confessions Tour (2006)
- Sticky & Sweet Tour (2008–2009)
- The MDNA Tour (2012)
- Rebel Heart Tour (2015–2016)
- Madame X Tour (2019–2020)
- The Celebration Tour (2023–2024)

== Enterprises ==
- Maverick (1992–2004)
- Ray of Light Foundation (1998)
- Raising Malawi (2006)
- Hard Candy Fitness (2010–2019)
- Truth or Dare by Madonna (2011–2018)

== See also ==
- List of largest music deals
- List of organisms named after famous people (born 1950–1974)
- List of Rock and Roll Hall of Fame inductees
- List of highest-grossing live music artists
