= Business of Madonna =

Aspect of Madonna's career

Madonna was the first solo female entrepreneur to grace a Forbes cover (1990).

American singer-songwriter and businesswoman Madonna has received coverage in business journalism. Madonna started some enterprises, including Maverick and its subdivision Maverick Records, making her one of the first female artists to establish an entertainment company and a record label. Maverick Records later became the highest-grossing artist-run label of its time. She received a favorable media reception in her role as a businesswoman, becoming the first solo female entrepreneur to appear on the cover of Forbes in 1990.

Throughout her career, academics and the media have discussed Madonna in relation to marketing strategies, as well as broader social themes, attracting both positive commentaries and criticism. Nicknamed the "Material Girl", Madonna is interpreted by some critics as embodying the materialism and consumer-oriented ethos of the 1980s. In addition, Madonna was described as a model of continual reinvention by others, while her career has also been marked by various controversies, and critics viewed her primarily as a marketing product.

Madonna set various earnings records in her industry. Madonna became the richest woman in music, before being surpassed in 2019. She recorded the highest earnings for a female pop star at that time (2013) and is the first female artist to earn more than $100 million in a single year (2009).

== Profile ==
=== Background and media coverage ===
Madonna's career has been examined from business and marketing perspectives. A 2013 issue of the journal Celebrity Studies noted that various scholars with academic interest in Madonna, focused their research on marketing strategies and consumer culture. According to authors of The Madonna Companion: Two Decades of Commentary (1999), Madonna became a "central image" in the studies of commercialism. Ann Power from The New York Times (1998) noted that she embodied capitalism to intellectuals, while professor Suzanna Danuta Walters (1995) argues that she was often represented as a "personification of commodity capitalism". The authors of The Madonna Connection (1993) wrote that scholars had detailed her "business practices", as well as her relations to the records, video, film and book industries.

Biographer Andrew Morton commented in Madonna (2001) that her "success has certainly impressed the business community". In NATO Review (2008), Peter van Ham wrote that various businesses have used Madonna as a role model of self-reinvention. University of Ulster marketing professor Stephen Brown described her case as "relevant" to the consumer research community, and noted that various commentators, from entertainers to academicians acknowledged her "promotional genius". The Kelley School of Business, in the early 2000s, referred to her as more than a "pop cult icon", suggesting "she is someone everyone can learn from", although outside the conventional framework of the 4Ps.

Author Jennifer Egan wrote in 2002 that a "popular answer" offered by her critics to define Madonna is that "she's done it through sheer business savvy". In Financial Times (2008), Ludovic Hunter-Tilney similarly noted that, in the view of her critics, she is right to describe herself as a businesswoman but wrong to call herself an artist. In From Hegel to Madonna: Towards a General Economy of Commodity Fetishism (1998), Robert Miklitsch describes Madonna as "largely a story about publicity and marketing", while professor Ann Cvetkovich similarly characterized her as a product of "intense marketing and public relations campaigns". Cvetkovich, however, suggested that the relationship between Madonna and her reception by global audiences "must be articulated". Media scholar Douglas Kellner has argued that "one cannot fully grasp the Madonna phenomenon without analyzing her marketing and publicity strategies".

=== Business ventures ===
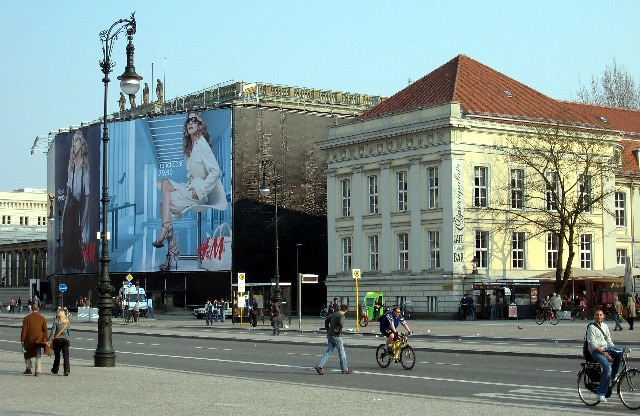
Far view of a billboard advertising Madonna's collaboration with H&M in 2007

According to biographer J. Randy Taraborrelli, Madonna started various enterprises, and became one of the first female celebrities to establish both an entertainment company and a record label (Maverick and Maverick Records). She is one of the first female musicians to become a CEO according to authors of Controversies of the Music Industry (2001). Robert Miklitsch (1998), Cranfield School of Management visiting scholar Colin Barrow (2004), and Kevin Sessums (c. 1993) similarly described her as a diverse "corporation" or "organization" unto herself.

Madonna has endorsed various campaigns and signed major commercial deals, including a $5 million endorsement agreement with Pepsi in 1989. Madonna also signed two of the largest music deals: a recording agreement with Warner Music in 1992, and a 360 deal with tour promoter Live Nation in 2007. According to the BBC, Madonna was the first major recording artist to choose such a deal with a touring company over a traditional record deal. Billboard reported that she became the inaugural artist signed to Live Nation's "Artist Nation" division.

==== Associated enterprises ====
- Madonna fashion brands:
  - Truth or Dare by Madonna
- Hard Candy Fitness
- Maverick
  - Maverick Films
  - Maverick Records
- Boy Toy Inc.
- Siren Films
- Music Tours Inc.
- Slutco
- Webo Girl Publishing Inc.
- Tidal
- Raising Malawi (non-profit organization)
- Ray of Light Foundation (non-profit organization)

=== Reputation ===
Billboard (2007) noted that Madonna as CEO, had "a reputation as being a tenacious executive as ubiquitous as her music". Early in her career, publications such as Forbes (1990) and The Canberra Times (1992), described Madonna as a "calculating businesswoman", and explained entertainers like her, avoided labels such as "manager" and "businesswoman". American political analyst Matt Towery in 1998, noted she did not portray herself as a "corporate manager or captain of industry".

According to writer Warren Allen Smith in 2000, many people in the 1990s spoke of Madonna as "the lady who works". Others referred to her as a workaholic, including critics Camille Paglia and Gina Arnold. Some publications referred to her as one of the hardest working and disciplined performers, including The Guardian (2023) and The Straits Times (2001). A few others deemed Madonna as an example of the American Dream or a female version of the self-made man.

Marketing tactics and publicity have been identified as central to Madonna's career, with some academics, including Brown, describing her as a "marketing genius". Madonna's first nationwide performance at the inaugural MTV Video Music Awards in 1984 has been characterized by The Greenwood Encyclopedia of Rock History (2006), as establishing her as a self-made star. Bitch magazine (2003) described the appearance as both a marketing strategy and a defining moment for women in rock music.

Madonna earned a reputation as a trendsetter, described by Rashod Ollison of The Baltimore Sun (2008) as a "career hallmark". Authors of Emotionally Intelligent Leadership (2009) noted that she was widely perceived as being "on the cutting edge". Business scholar Roger Blackwell wrote that she functioned as a "conduit" for the "introduction" and "acceptance" of trends in fashion, dance, and lifestyle. Business theorists Jamie Anderson and Martin Kupp described her as "one of the first artists to bring this approach to the music industry". However, following the release of Hard Candy (2008), media outlets characterized her instead as a follower of trends.

=== Reception ===
She's not really a singer per se, but she created the whole idea of a pop icon marketing herself. She's the epitome of the modern entertainer.

— Entertainment Weekly (1999)

Madonna's business acumen received a positive response both within and outside the music industry. In 2007, Billboard included Madonna in their Power Players list, which recognizes women who "have made an important mark on the music business". In 2004, Colin Barrow of the Cranfield School of Management noted that Madonna was referred to as "America's smartest businesswoman". In 2013, Dan Bigman from Forbes recalled that the magazine viewed her as one of the "shrewdest businesswomen we'd ever seen" in the early 1990s, a remark that author of Profiles of Female Genius (1994) described as unusual by a female figure at that time. In 1990, Madonna became the first solo female entrepreneur to appear on a Forbes cover. A contributor of The Journal of Business & Industrial Marketing described Madonna in 1992, as a signifier of changing "world's views" of the boundaries between "music, entertainment, and business". Her approach of continual reinvention was later cited as a model by other businesses and corporations, as cited by an author in NATO Review (2008). In 2007, Alfons Cornella from Deusto Business School wrote that node used the phrase "this is a Madonna company" to define a company capable of reinventing successively. At some point of her career, media publications such as The Daily Telegraph (1998) and Deutsche Welle (2018), similarly referred to her as arguably "music business' most successful woman".

The Irish Examiner wrote in 2018, "she broke new ground, harnessing and marketing herself". Similarly, in 1986, The Sunday Times argued with Madonna's spurt to fame, "new heights have been scaled or new depths plumbed". According to Brown (2014), she is credited with helping transform "self-reinvention" and "multiple identities" into a business strategy in her industry. Ohio State University scholar David Bruenger said that "she pioneered brand management strategies". Different publications and authors commented positively on Madonna's brand. She is called a "quintessential brand" in The Experience Effect (2010), and the author suggested that she was perhaps the epitome of celebrity marketing and branding. Publicist Michael Levine made similar remarks in discussing her 20-years plus career. In The End of Advertising as We Know It (2003), authors Sergio Zyman and Armin Brott, referred to her "uncanny ability to retool" her brand. Academics from Warwick Murray (2006) to business theorists such as Michael Czinkota and Ilkka Ronkainen (2013), once called her a "global brand".

==== Expressions coined ====
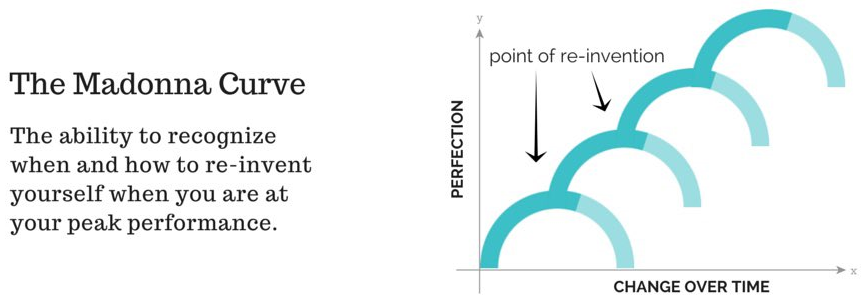
The "Madonna-curve" in the words of Tim Galles from Barkley Inc.

- Madonna effect: Business professor Oren Harari used the phrase inspired by her business tactics and changes (reinventions). In Information Today's Event DV (2008), the "Madonna effect" is described as "all about reinventing yourself to keep yourself and your business to the culture of that demographic".
- Madonna-curve: According to Peter van Ham of the Clingendael Institute, writing in NATO Review (2008), the "Madonna curve" is a phrase used by some business analysts to describe "adapting to new tasks whilst staying true to one's own principles". The usage for NATO was not well received by analyst Robin Shepherd from Chatham House who argued that "an ageing pop diva is not an excellent analogy for NATO". Canadian educator and designer Bruce Mau, referred to it, saying "it's named after the pop star for her capacity to alter her image and stay popular. However radical the visual difference, she is always Madonna".

== Commercial impact ==
=== Commentary ===
According to Theodore Koutsobinas in The Political Economy of Status (2014), media celebrities like Madonna were "widely seen as symbols" of the Great Moderation period. In the early 1990s, Madonna was seen as "a valuable property in the world of international capital". Madonna ranked among U.S. leading exports of 1992, with American political scientist Walter Berns describing her as one of the biggest American export items, while Spanish newspaper ABC referred to her as the "most prolific, profitable and universal consumer object since the commercialization of Coca-Cola". American business editor Robert J. Samuelson wrote in 1991 for The New York Times, an article titled "Madonna and the New Economic Order", describing the growing aspects of a global economy. American business writer Tom Peters reported in 1993 that she ran a "positive trade balance" overseas leading him to describe it as part of a "new soft economy".

Professor Roy Shuker in Understanding Popular Music (1994) suggested that Madonna is "an economic entity as she is a cultural phenomenon". The author of the International Communication and Globalization (1997) mentioned Madonna along with Michael Jackson, the Internet and other cultural motifs for paving the way for the global economy. In Madonnaland (2016), Alina Simone said of Madonna that she "isn't just a musician; she is the 'whole package' and a 'real' prophet of commerce. [...] One might even call her an artist of commerce".

=== Tourism and commerce ===
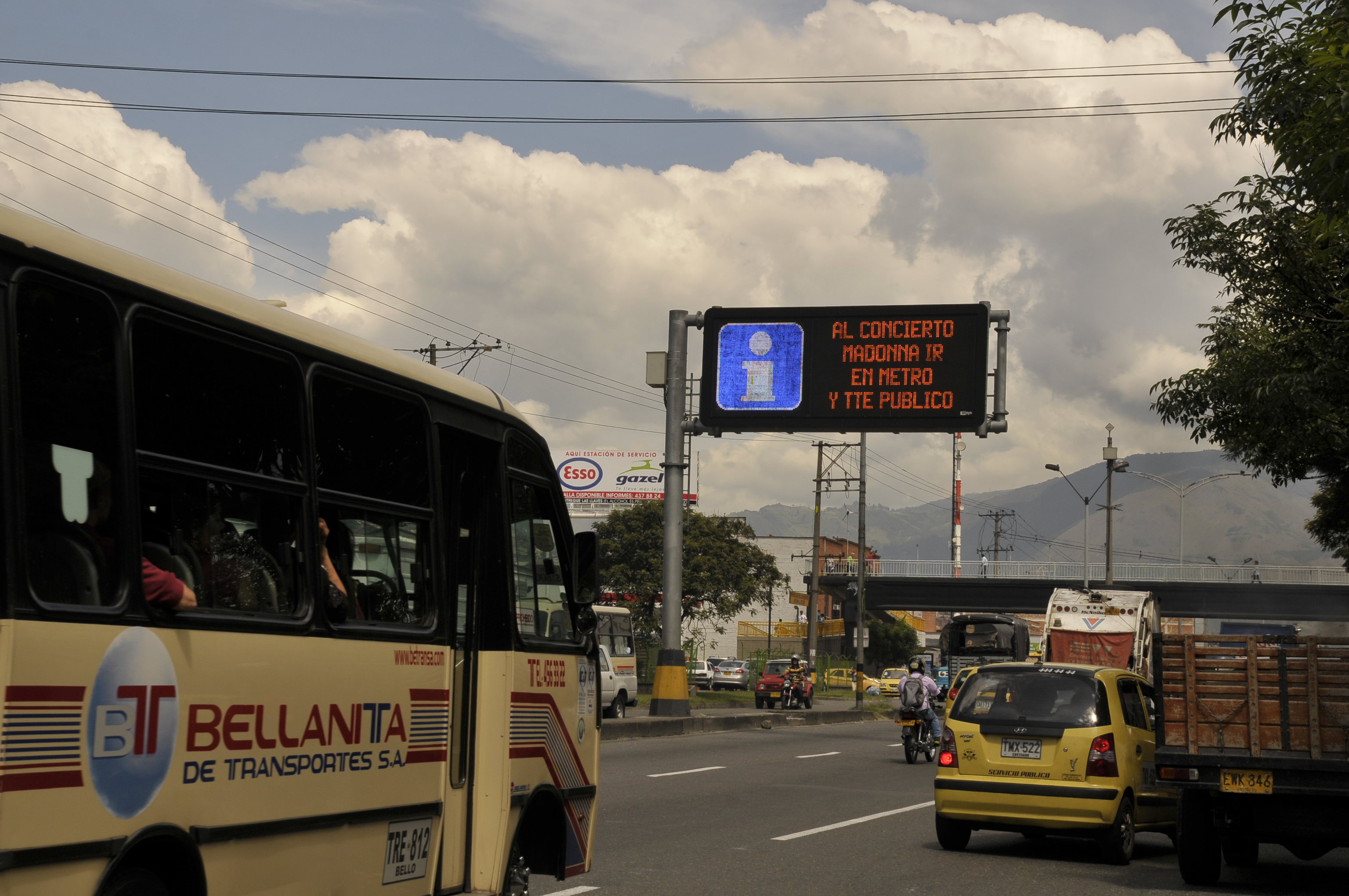
Public street announcements for the MDNA Tour in Colombia (2012). The concert temporarily stimulated the local economy of Medellín.

According to Manuel Heredia (2019), Belize's former Minister of Tourism, "La Isla Bonita" (1986) enhanced Ambergris Caye's visibility, which continues to draw visitors seeking the place the song evokes. According to media reports from BBC and Reuters in the 2000s, Madonna's visits to Israel helped boost the country's tourism, particularly that of the city of Safed. She stimulated Rio de Janeiro's economy following the announcement and performance of her one-time Celebration Tour concert at Copacabana Beach, Brazil, in May 2024, and media outlets labeled the phenomenon as "the Madonna effect". Geopolitics author Parag Khanna believes that Madonna helped "put Malawi on the map". In 2013, the BBC reported that Malawi was "enjoying a boom in visitors", with tourism increasing by 181% over the previous seven years after Madonna's first visit. The 2000 wedding of Madonna and Guy Ritchie generated significant publicity for the Scottish Highlands, and local authorities referred to it as the "Madonna effect".

Portuguese and Spanish publications such as Expresso and ABC credited Madonna with helping stimulate Portugal's tourism industry, particularly "luxury tourism" and real estate sectors during her residence in the country (2017–2020), a phenomenon described as the "Madonna effect" by the ABC. However, Bloomberg News reported in 2017 that celebrities such as Madonna contributed to rising home prices, which raised concerns among locals. Madonna's name has also been proposed by organizations and individuals to promote tourism in locations such as La Palma (also called "La Isla Bonita"), Turkey, Pacentro, Italy (the city of her paternal grandparents), and by the Hong Kong Tourism Board.

Publications such as Musician as well as academic Miklitsch, referred to Madonna as WarnerMedia's leading person or their "most effective corporate symbol" behind Bugs Bunny at the height of her career. She was reported to have affected in their stock, while an author noted that they usually featured her picture prominently in their annual report. Fred Goodman (2010) called her "one of their biggest and most consistent-selling artists", and Michael Ovitz (2018) referred to her as Warner Music's "hit machine". In 1998, Ingrid Sischy of Vanity Fair described Maverick Records as a "highly profitable" artist-run label, and one of the "few artist-involved entities" to have moved into a "big-league status". Around this time, it had generated more than $1 billion for Warner Bros. Records, more than any other artist-run label, according to Spin, which called it "the most successful vanity label".

Madonna's advertising debut in Japan with a campaign for Mitsubishi Electric between 1986 and 1987, helped invigorate interest and prompt Japanese advertising agencies to feature more foreign celebrities in advertisements at the time, as described by author Sean Mooney (2000). According to a report from UPI in 2010, Madonna convinced a number of celebrities to invest in the company Vita Coco. In a conversation with TheLadders.com in 2019, its founder mentioned Madonna's role in the brand's growth. Spanish newspaper El Confidencial wrote before Madonna, the water was sold only in ethnic food stores and small local stores.

== Wealth and earnings ==
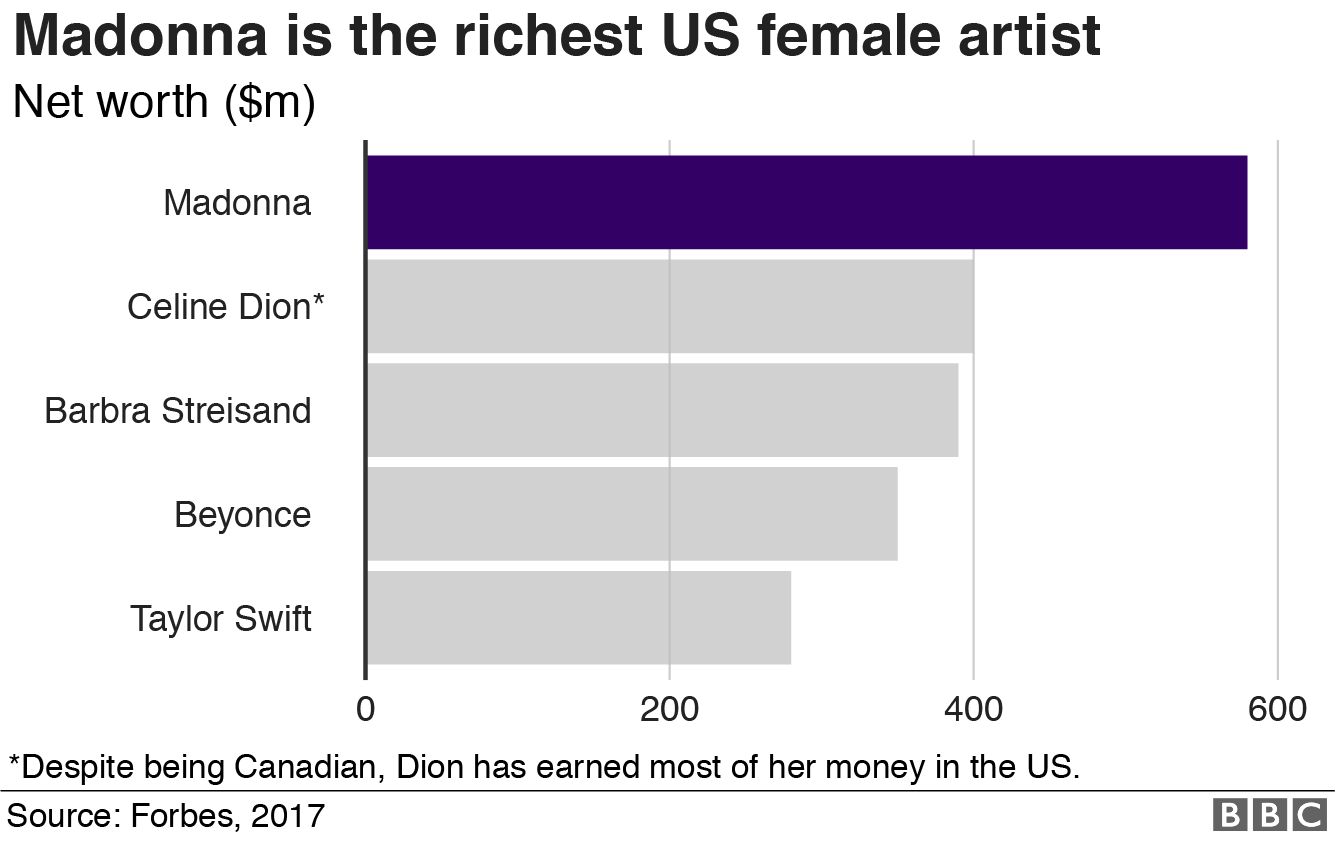
Madonna net worth as of 2017 (BBC via Forbes)

For professor E. Ann Kaplan in 1993, Madonna "has entered the public sphere as an entrepreneur earning a lot of money, something that is not considered natural for women". To feminist scholars Cheris Kramarae and Dale Spender in Routledge International Encyclopedia of Women (2004), Madonna achieved "the kind of financial control that women had long fought for within industry". Authors of On the Edge (1998) called her the "most financially successful female entertainer in history". Author Matthew David named her "the most profitable female performing artist of all time" in Peer to Peer and the Music Industry (2010).

=== Lists and records ===
In 1990, Forbes remarked on her consistent appearances on its list as she "nearly" reached the top. In 2007, Madonna topped their inaugural list of "Cash Queens of Music". She also appeared in their inaugural list of America's wealthiest women (originally named America's 50 Richest Self-Made Women) in 2015, and was the highest-ranked singer. In 2017, Madonna was the second highest-ranked entertainer on the list, behind Oprah Winfrey, and achieved her highest self-made score, at 9.

Outside of Forbes, Madonna has also appeared in other earning lists. In March 1986, the New Sunday Times reported that she banked a "staggering" $25 million in just one year. Madonna was the top musician of the Billboard's Moneymaker lists in 2008 and 2013. Madonna became the highest-paid musician in Britain on the 2002 Sunday Times Rich List.

Forbes lists (does not include pretax earnings)
Period	List	Earnings	Adjusted inflation (2025 $)	Ref.
1987	Forbes Top 40	$47 million	$138 million	
1988	Forbes Top 40	$46 million	$130 million	
1989	Forbes Top 40	$43 million	$117 million	
1990	Forbes Top 40	$62 million	$161 million	
1991	Forbes Top 40	$63 million	$155 million	
1992	Forbes Top 40	$48 million	$113 million	
1993	Forbes Top 40	$37 million	$85 million	
2002	Forbes Celebrity 100	$43 million	$77 million	
2005	Forbes Celebrity 100	$50 million	$82 million	
2007	Forbes Celebrity 100	$72 million	$112 million	
2009	Forbes Celebrity 100	$110 million	$165 million	
2010	Forbes Celebrity 100	$58 million	$86 million	
2013	Forbes Celebrity 100	$125 million	$173 million	
2016	Forbes Celebrity 100	$76.5 million	$103 million	

On Forbes, Madonna was the highest-grossing woman in media prior to 1990. Madonna also became the first female singer to earn more than $100 million in a single year, and was named Forbes's richest female artist, before being surpassed by Rihanna in 2019. According to the author of Virtually Christian (2011), Madonna was reputed to be the highest-earning female performer of the 20th century.

Madonna recorded the highest royalty payment for a female artist, second overall behind Michael Jackson, after her 1992 deal with Warner, equaling 20% . This feat was later surpassed by Janet Jackson in 1996. Madonna broke Celine Dion's record established in 1998 for the highest earning for a female pop star, grossing $125 million for June 2012 – 2013. She was later surpassed by Katy Perry and Taylor Swift. In addition, the Guinness World Records recognized her with the highest annual earnings for a female artist in their 2007 edition.

== Criticisms and controversies ==
=== Marketing ===
Madonna has been the subject of criticism and has frequently been associated with controversy throughout her career. Nekesa Mumbi (2006) of the Associated Press reported that Madonna has used controversy as a sales tactic, and Paul Grein from Billboard (1990), suggested that she "realized that controversy, generating a lot of publicity, is the key to staying on top". In 1992, American writer Michael Gross referred to her as the "world's most advanced human publicity-seeking missile". Editors of The Madonna Connection (1993) wrote that she had been criticized for her "flagrant self-marketing strategies".

The release of her first book, Sex (1992), became one of the major controversies of her career. Daniel Harris of The Nation (1992) noted that some mainstream academics called her a "talentless opportunist" and a "monster created by the publicity machine". In Madonna's later career, a researcher cited by media outlets such as The Independent argued in 2016 that her brand had lost influence among Millennials, describing her as a "toxic figure" and suggesting that she was "desperate" to remain relevant to younger generations. In 2022, Texas State University academic Katie Kapurch described that Madonna was "recycling" the shock value associated with her "heyday" on social media platforms such as TikTok.

Commentators and critics have characterized Madonna as a marketing and manufactured product, describing both her and her work as "commercial hokum", "gleaming and superficial" and "manipulative". Writing for Time magazine in 1994, Christopher John Farley stated that her career had "never really been about music" and instead emphasized publicity. Early in her career, rock music critic Dave Marsh described her as a "product of the shopping-mall culture". Madonna herself has addressed perceptions of her career. In Madonna: A Rebel Life (2023), Mary Gabriel documented that Madonna stated "If you're a celebrity, everything you do is suddenly perceived as a way to get attention". According to Merle Ginsberg in Style magazine (2003), Madonna commented: "People always see the evolution of my career as marketing. I change. I evolve. [...] Most celebrities and iconographic figures have one presentation, and that's what they stick with. Maybe that's what people find unsettling about me [...]".

=== Religion and sexuality ===
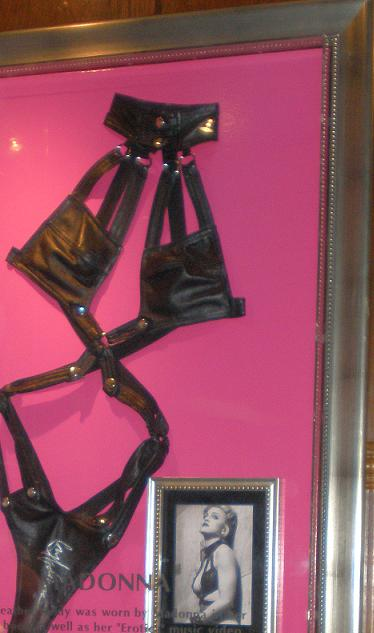
The leather string, used in her Sex book (1992) and in the "Erotica" video.

Madonna's use of religious symbolism has attracted criticism. Authors such as Paul Schenck and Rob Schenck (The Extermination of Christianity: A Tyranny of Consensus, 1993) argued that she used religious motifs to promote her brand or generate free publicity. Likewise, critics have characterized sexuality as a central element to her image, with Amy Raphal arguing in Grrrls (1996) that "taking the concept further than any other female artist before her, Madonna sold herself almost exclusively in terms of her sexuality". Academic marketer Stephen Brown has described Madonna as being known for "selling sex". Similarly, Christian author H. T. Spence (2002) criticized Madonna, saying that "she has sold literally tens of millions of records on the theme of pornography".

=== Trends and business ventures ===
Madonna has also been criticized for trends she helped popularize. In 2016, Susan Hopkins, a feminist lecturer at the University of Southern Queensland, wrote in The Conversation that Madonna had "pioneered a lot of cultural trends that didn't do average working women a lot of favour". According to American journalist Christopher Glazek (2015), critics have accused Madonna of "getting rich" by "mining" of gay subcultures. Some members of the Black LGBT and ballroom communities have criticized Madonna for bringing voguing into the mainstream, feeling that she reduced the dance expression to a passing fad. A 2000 article in Vanity Fair reported that the success of Madonna and Michael Jackson, contributed to escalating music video production costs, "enraging record company executives and artists".

Some of Madonna's business and commercial ventures have also attracted criticism. Madonna's 1989 deal with Pepsi became controversial after the release of the music video "Like a Prayer", whose religious imagery prompted protests and boycotts from Christian community, leading Pepsi to cancel the campaign while allowing Madonna to retain her $5 million advance. Biographer J. Randy Taraborrelli (2002) labeled it as one of the "biggest controversies in the history of corporate advertising's" related to pop music. An editor from the Telegraph Herald, mentioned music deals of 1992 by high-profile artists such as Madonna, describing "the goal wasn't to improve the music, it was to generate the most hype". Billboard noted that her 2007 deal with Live Nation attracted "detractors". In addition, Madonna was named in the Paradise Papers.

=== Social commentary and critiques ===
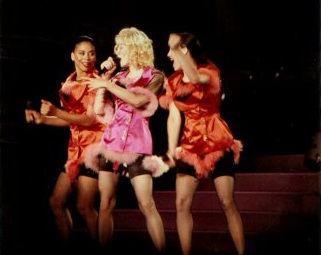
Madonna performing "Material Girl" during the Blond Ambition World Tour (1990).

Madonna has been the subject of discussion and criticism from various political (wide spectrum), religious, cultural and moral perspectives. Scottish author Andrew O'Hagan, as noted by French academic Georges Claude Guilbert (2002), observed: "Many people write about Madonna as a greedy inauthentic something or other [...] So Madonna likes money. So Madonna means materialism".

German cultural critic Diedrich Diederichsen (2010) argued that Madonna cultivated a reputation for being ambitious. Editors of Madonna's Drowned Worlds (2004) described this reputation as "legendary", while authors of Brands That Rock (2004) identified ambition as a "common denominator" in marketing analyses of Madonna. Feminist critic bell hooks (1990s), as noted by scholars from the Nordic Association for American Studies, characterized Madonna's ambition as "monetary and a global media ambition". However, Madonna later expressed different views, and discussed these views with journalists Matthew Todd and Alexis Petridis in the 2010s. Brown argued that her "Material Girl" persona came to embody the "Greed is Good" ethos of the 1980s. In The Empathic Civilization (2010), economist Jeremy Rifkin stated she "capture[d] the spirit of the age when she proclaimed to be a Material Girl". Christian author Homer Edwin Young (1994) wrote "I can think of few personalities who seem to love for pleasure more than Madonna", calling her a "queen of hedonism".

For some critics [...] Madonna represents nothing but the worst excesses of commercial exploitation.

— Glenn Ward (2010).

O'Hagan also commented that Madonna "may sell huge amounts of records" but "she remains rejected by millions of Americans on whose moral values she tramples". In addition, author Douglas Baldwin (1997) used Madonna as an example of how people in fields such as medicine receive very few rewards in relation to their contribution to society, while entertainers like her earn much more than they contribute to it.

Throughout her career, Madonna was described as an embodiment of the "globalization of American consumer culture" and of the materialism and consumer-oriented ethos of the 1980s. Critics also characterized Madonna as an example of crass commercialism and the epitome of banal consumerism, while scholar Akbar Ahmed described her as the "supreme product of the consumerist culture" in the 1990s. In the 1990s, author Kristen Marthe Lentz commented that when it comes to Madonna, "suddenly everybody is a critic of capitalism".

== See also ==
- Cultural impact of Madonna
- Madonna studies
- Forbes list of the world's highest-paid musicians

== Book sources ==
- Baldwin, Douglas (1997). Ideologies. McGraw-Hill Ryerson. ISBN 0075527774.
- Barnet, Richard D.; Burriss, Larry L. (2001). Controversies of the Music Industry. Greenwood. ISBN 0313310947.
- Bartlett, Anthony (2011). Virtually Christian. O Books. ISBN 978-1846943966.
- Benson, Carol; Metz, Allen (1999). The Madonna Companion: Two Decades of Commentary. Music Sales Group. ISBN 0-02-864972-9.
- Blackwell, Roger; Stephan, Tina (2004). Brands That Rock. Wiley. ISBN 978-0-471-48344-1.
- Brown, Stephen (2004). Free Gift Inside!!: Forget the Customer. Develop Marketease. University of Michigan Press. ISBN 1841126020.
- Brown, Vanessa (2014). Cool Shades: The History and Meaning of Sunglasses. University of Michigan Press. ISBN 978-0857854643.
- Bruenger, David (2016). Making Money, Making Music. University of California Press. ISBN 978-0520966062.
- Bucar, Liz (2022). Stealing My Religion: Not Just Any Cultural Appropriation. Harvard University Press. ISBN 978-0674287266.
- Burnett, Robert (2002). The Global Jukebox. Taylor & Francis. ISBN 1134872100.
- Cornella, Alfons (2007). La alquimia de la innovación (in Spanish). Deusto Business School. ISBN 978-8423424627.
- Cross, Mary (2007). Madonna: A Biography. Greenwood Publishing Group. ISBN 978-0-313-33811-3.
- Cvetkovich, Ann (2018). Articulating The Global And The Local: Globalization And Cultural Studies. Taylor & Francis. ISBN 978-0429981814.
- Czinkota, Michael R.; Ronkainen, Ilkka A. (2012). International Marketing. Cengage Learning. ISBN 978-1285687162.
- David, Matthew (2010). Peer to Peer and the Music Industry. SAGE Publications. ISBN 978-1847870056.
- Fouz-Hernández, Santiago; Jarman-Ivens, Freya (2004). Madonna's Drowned Worlds: New Approaches to Her cCultural Transformations, 1983-2003. Ashgate. ISBN 978-0754633716.
- Gabriel, Mary (2023). Madonna: A Rebel Life. Little, Brown. ISBN 978-0316456449.
- Goodman, Fred (2010). Fortune's Fool. Simon & Schuster. ISBN 978-1439160503.
- Gourley, Catherine (2008). Ms. and The Material Girls: Perceptions of Women From The 1970s Through The 1990s. Twenty-First Century Books. ISBN 978-0822568063.
- Guilbert, Georges-Claude (2015). Madonna as Postmodern Myth. McFarland. ISBN 978-0-786-48071-5.
- Harari, Oren (2006). Break From the Pack: How to Compete in a Copycat Economy. Pearson Education. ISBN 0132703823.
- Horowitz, David A.; Carroll, Peter N. (1998). On the Edge: The U.S. in the 20th-century. West/Wadsworth. ISBN 0314128824.
- Janosik, MaryAnn (2006). The Greenwood Encyclopedia of Rock History: The video generation, 1981-1990. Greenwood Press.
- Joseph, Jim (2010). The Experience Effect. AMACOM. ISBN 978-0814415559.
- Kellner, Douglas (2003). Media Spectacle. Psychology Press. ISBN 041526829X.
- Khanna, Parag (2011). How to Run the World: Charting a Course to the Next Renaissance. Random House. ISBN 978-0679604280.
- Koutsobinas, Theodore (2014). The Political Economy of Status. Edward Elgar Publishing. ISBN 978-1783477456.
- Kramarae, Cheris; Spender, Dale (2004). Routledge International Encyclopedia of Women. Routledge. ISBN 1135963150.
- Landrum, Gene N. (1994). Profiles of Female Genius: Thirteen Creative Women who Changed the World. Prometheus Books. ISBN 0-87975-892-9.
- Levine, Michael (2003). A Branded World: Adventures in Public Relations and the Creation of Superbrands. John Wiley & Sons. ISBN 0-471-43288-1.
- Löfgren, Hans; Shima, Alan (1998). After Consensus: Critical Challenge and Social Change in America. Acta Universitatis Gothoburgensis. ISBN 9173463353.
- Miklitsch, Robert (1998). From Hegel to Madonna. SUNY Press. ISBN 0791435407.
- Mohammadi, Efraim (1997). International Communication and Globalization. SAGE Publishing. ISBN 0-85702-614-3.
- Mooney, Sean (2000). 5,110 Days in Tokyo and Everything's Hunky-dory. Quorum Books. ISBN 1567203612.
- Morton, Andrew (2001). Madonna. Macmillan Publishers. ISBN 0-312-98310-7.
- Murray, Warwick E. (2006). Geographies of Globalization. Taylor & Francis. ISBN 1134369018.
- Ovitz, Michael (2018). Who Is Michael Ovitz?. Penguin. ISBN 978-1101601488.
- Owen, David (1997). Sociology After Postmodernism. SAGE Publications. ISBN 978-0803975149.
- Paglia, Camille (2011). Sex, Art, and American Culture: Essays. Knopf Doubleday Publishing Group. ISBN 978-0307765550.
- Rifkin, Jeremy (2010). The Empathic Civilization. Polity. ISBN 978-0745641461.
- Raphael, Amy (1996). Grrrls. St. Martin's Press. ISBN 978-0-312-14109-7.
- Rosebush, Judson; Cunningham, Steve (1996). Electronic Publishing on CD-ROM. O'Reilly Media. ISBN 1565922093.
- Rowe, Kathleen (1995). The Unruly Woman: Gender and the Genres of Laughter. University of Texas Press. ISBN 0292790724.
- Saunders, Mike (2020). HumanCentric: Technology Fails Unless it Means Something to Someone. Jonathan Ball Publishers. ISBN 978-0639992969.
- Schenck, Paul C.; Schenck, Robert L. (1993). The Extermination of Christianity: A Tyranny of Consensus. Huntington House. ISBN 1563840510.
- Schwichtenberg, Cathy (1993). The Madonna connection. Westview Press. ISBN 0813313961.
- Seery, John E. (2018). Political Theory for Mortals: Shades of Justice, Images of Death. Cornell University Press. ISBN 978-1501718311.
- Simone, Alina (2016). Madonnaland. University of Texas Press. ISBN 978-1477308912.
- Shankman, Marcy Levy; Allen, Scott J. (2009). Emotionally Intelligent Leadership: A Guide for College Students. John Wiley & Sons. ISBN 978-0470596593.
- Sheumaker, Helen (2017). Artifacts from Modern America. ABC-CLIO. ISBN 978-1440846830.
- Shuker, Roy (2013). Understanding Popular Music. Routledge. ISBN 978-1134564798.
- Smart, Barry (2010). Consumer Society: Critical Issues & Environmental Consequences. SAGE Publications. ISBN 978-0857026934.
- Smith, Warren Allen (2000). Who's who in Hell: A Handbook and International Directory for Humanists, Freethinkers, Naturalists, Rationalists, and Non-theists. Barricade Books. ISBN 1569801584.
- Spence, H. T. (2002). Confronting Contemporary Christian Music: A Plain Account of Its History, Philosophy, and Future. Foundations Bible College. ISBN 1882542401.
- Stange, Mary Zeiss; Oyster, Carol K.; Sloan, Jane E. (2011). Encyclopedia of Women in Today's World. Vol. 1. SAGE Publishing. ISBN 978-1-4129-7685-5.
- Stewart, Mark (2009). Music Legends. Gareth Stevens Pub. ISBN 978-0836891652.
- Taraborrelli, J. Randy (2001). Madonna: An Intimate Biography. Sidgwick & Jackson. ISBN 028307289X.
- Taraborrelli, J. Randy (2002). Madonna: An Intimate Biography. Berkley Books. ISBN 0425186695.
- Todd, Matthew (2016). Straight Jacket. Random House. ISBN 978-1448111107.
- Towery, Matt (1998). Powerchicks: How Women Will Dominate America. Longstreet Press. ISBN 1563525216.
- Walters, Suzanna Danuta (1995). Material Girls: Making Sense of Feminist Cultural Theory. University of California Press. ISBN 0520089782.
- Ward, Glenn (2010). Understand Postmodernism: Teach Yourself. John Murray Press. ISBN 978-1444133981.
- Zyman, Sergio; Brott, Armin (2003). The End of Advertising as We Know It. John Wiley & Sons. ISBN 047142966X.
- Young, Homer Edwin (1994). Been there. Done that. Now what?: The meaning of life may surprise you. Broadman & Holman Publishers. ISBN 978-0805461589.
