= Selena Cuffe =

American businesswoman

Selena Cuffe, née Saunders (born 5 November 1975 in Culver City, California) is an American businesswoman. She is best known for co-founding Heritage Link Brands, LLC, the largest global importer of black produced wine, with her husband, Khary Cuffe. In January 2024, Selena Cuffe was appointed to the Federal Reserve Bank, Los Angeles Board of Directors.

== Early life and education ==
The only joint child of Dr. Joseph Saunders and Veronica Saunders, Cuffe was raised in the View Park-Windsor Hills community of Los Angeles County, California, United States by her mother. Cuffe's father, Joseph, died one month before her second birthday.

Cuffe's paternal great-grandfather, J. Saunders, was born into slavery. A descendant of the Ashanti tribe of Ghana, he was freed by the Emancipation Proclamation at the age of eight. He had 16 children, the youngest of whom was Cuffe's grandfather, Titus Saunders Sr., a de-segregationist of the Georgia public school system who founded the state's first integrated school transportation system. Both of Cuffe's paternal grandparents graduated from college in the 1920s.

Cuffe graduated with an AB in International Relations from Stanford University. During college, she became a member of Delta Sigma Theta sorority. She also completed the Sponsors for Education opportunity (SEO) program, where she interned for an investment bank on Wall Street. Cuffe also holds a Master of Business Administration, with honors, from the Harvard Business School and is certified, with merit, by the Wine and Spirits Educational Trust. Cuffe is chair of the Nominating & Governance committee of the Harvard Business School Women's Student Association Alumnae Advisory Board, Vice President Emeritus of the Harvard Business School Alumni Board, and she currently serves on Stanford University's Bing Overseas Studies Program Advisory Council.

== Early career ==
Early in her career, Cuffe worked for United Airlines. During her tenure at the airline, her responsibilities included territorial sales, the promotion of new routes, and business development initiatives related to united.com and the launch of online travel websites, Hotwire and Orbitz.

She received her marketing training from the Procter & Gamble Company in Cincinnati, Ohio, where she served as Assistant Brand Manager for the Pringles brand,. Her primary responsibility was managing marketing plans for the Brazil and Mexico markets.

In her final position before founding Heritage Link Brands, LLC, Selena was a Director for the Council on International Educational Exchange (CIEE), overseeing the promotion of student and work exchanges for 50,000+ people worldwide. She left CIEE in January 2007 to work for Heritage Link Brands, LLC full-time.

== Heritage Link Brands ==
While on an unrelated business trip to South Africa in September 2005, Cuffe decided to visit the first annual Soweto Wine Festival in Johannesburg, organised by the Cape Wine Academy. There, she met vintners from the Seven Sisters winery, one of the only black-owned wineries in South Africa. The Seven Sisters were having difficulty exporting to the United States and finding a distributor in their local market. At the same festival Cuffe found that out of South Africa's $3-billion wine industry, less than two percent was owned by blacks. Seeing the inequality – blacks made up over 80 percent of the country's population – and wanting to help the indigenous vintners she had encountered, Cuffe began to craft the idea Heritage Link Brands, LLC.

Heritage Link Brands was founded in October 2005. Cuffe remained with the Council on International Educational Exchange while she financed the new company with her savings and credit cards. In 2006 she brought M'hudi, the first black owned family vineyard in South Africa, post-apartheid into the company's wine portfolio. In January 2007, Cuffe left her job to run Heritage Link Brands, LLC. In the following month, February, the wines were first launched in a test market with Whole Foods Market.

That spring, Heritage Link Brands Wine Club and Shop were established, and TIME magazine featured Cuffe and her company in September 2007, exactly two years after Cuffe visited the Soweto Wine Festival. Heritage Link Brands wine can now be found in over 40 states. The company also imports wines from the Fair Trade certified community of Koopmanskloof (producing under the label One World). One World holds the distinction of being the first Fair Trade certified wine to be served onboard any US airline.

Heritage Link Brands has since expanded its horizontal and vertical presence within the wine industry. In 2015, Cuffe began importing wine from France to produce the house red and white wine for the musical Waitress, Broadway's first ever, all-female creative production team in history. Tickets for the world premiere production sold out. Heritage Link Brands also produces the house wine for Broadway plays, Charlie and the Chocolate Factory and War Paint.

In 2016, Cuffe negotiated exclusive rights to import award-winning Brazilian wine producer Casa Valduga, home to the largest sparkling wine cellar in South America and famously listed as one of 1,000 Places to Visit Before You Die.

In South Africa, in partnership with Burdell Properties, Selena Cuffe negotiated interest acquisition of Silkbush Mountain Vineyards, a 138-hectare (340-acre) property in Breedekloof, 90 km east of Cape Town, South Africa, in the famous Western Cape Winelands. Its cultivars, planted on sloped hillsides, up to 700 m above sea level, include: Cabernet Sauvignon (26.97 ha), Pinotage (12.85 ha), Shiraz (12.81 ha), Merlot (7.26 ha), Cabernet Franc (4.89ha), Malbec (3.55ha), Petit Verdot (3.95ha), Viognier (3.09 ha), Petit Syrah (2.59 ha), Pinot Noir (2.2ha), Grenache Noir (1.76 ha), Semillon (1.5ha), Sauvignon Blanc (1.5ha) and Mourvedre (1.35ha).

== SodexoMagic ==
In March 2020, Cuffe was named as president of SodexoMAGIC, a joint-venture between Magic Johnson Enterprises and Sodexo, Inc, based in Beverly Hills.

== Blackstone Consulting, Inc. & RJB Properties ==
In April 2023, Cuffe was named Chief Growth Officer for Blackstone Consulting, Inc., an $800M, 9,000-person international service provider, minority business enterprise (MBE), and Corporate Plus member of the National Minority Supplier Development Council (NMSDC) with a client base that includes the U.S. Department of Defense, Fortune 500 companies, hospitals, schools, universities and industrial sites. In addition, she is Chief Growth Officer of RJB Properties, Inc., a leader in the “K through 12” educational market for janitorial and maintenance services as well as higher education campuses, commercial office spaces, convention centers, military installations, and banks.

== Personal life ==
A mother of three children, Cuffe is married to fellow co-founder of Heritage Link Brands, Khary Cuffe, a graduate of Harvard University's Graduate School of Business and John F. Kennedy School of Government. Khary's parents emigrated from Jamaica to the United States in the 1960s. His maternal uncle is Derrick F. Kellier, Jamaica's former Member of Parliament and Minister of Agriculture.

== Honors ==
- 2022 UCLA Riordan Programs Hall of Fame Inductee
- 2019 Brooklyn Library Women Trailblazers Award
- 2017 Les Batisseurs de l'Économie Africaine (Africa Economy Builders Award)
- 2016 Life Member, Council on Foreign Relations
- 2016 Riordan Program Distinguished Alumni Achievement Award, UCLA Anderson School of Management
- 2016 Vision in Wine Award, BCAGlobal
- 2015 WABF Venture Competition Judge, University of Pennsylvania Wharton School of Business
- 2015 Brooklyn Honors, Bedford Stuyvesant YMCA
- 2010 League of Black Women Black Rose Award Recipient
- 2009 Black Enterprise Magazine, "B.E. Next Entrepreneur of the Year"
- 1993 Glamour Magazine College Woman of the Year (whose winners have also included Hillary Clinton, Oprah Winfrey, Condoleezza Rice, Alexandra Keeman, Martha Stewart and Diane Sawyer)

== Publications ==
- International Business, 8th Edition: Michael Czinkota (Georgetown University), Ilkka A. Ronkainen (Georgetown University), Michael H. Moffett (Thunderbird School of Global Management), August 2010, ©2011 pgs. 675–678
- How to Open & Operate a Financially Successful Import Export Business: With Companion CD-ROM, Maritza Manresa, Paperback, Atlantic Publishing Company April 1, 2010, pg. 101
- The $100 Start Up: Reinvent the Way You Make a Living, Do What You Love, and Create a New Future, 2012, pgs. 103, 270, 276
