= Madonna filmography =

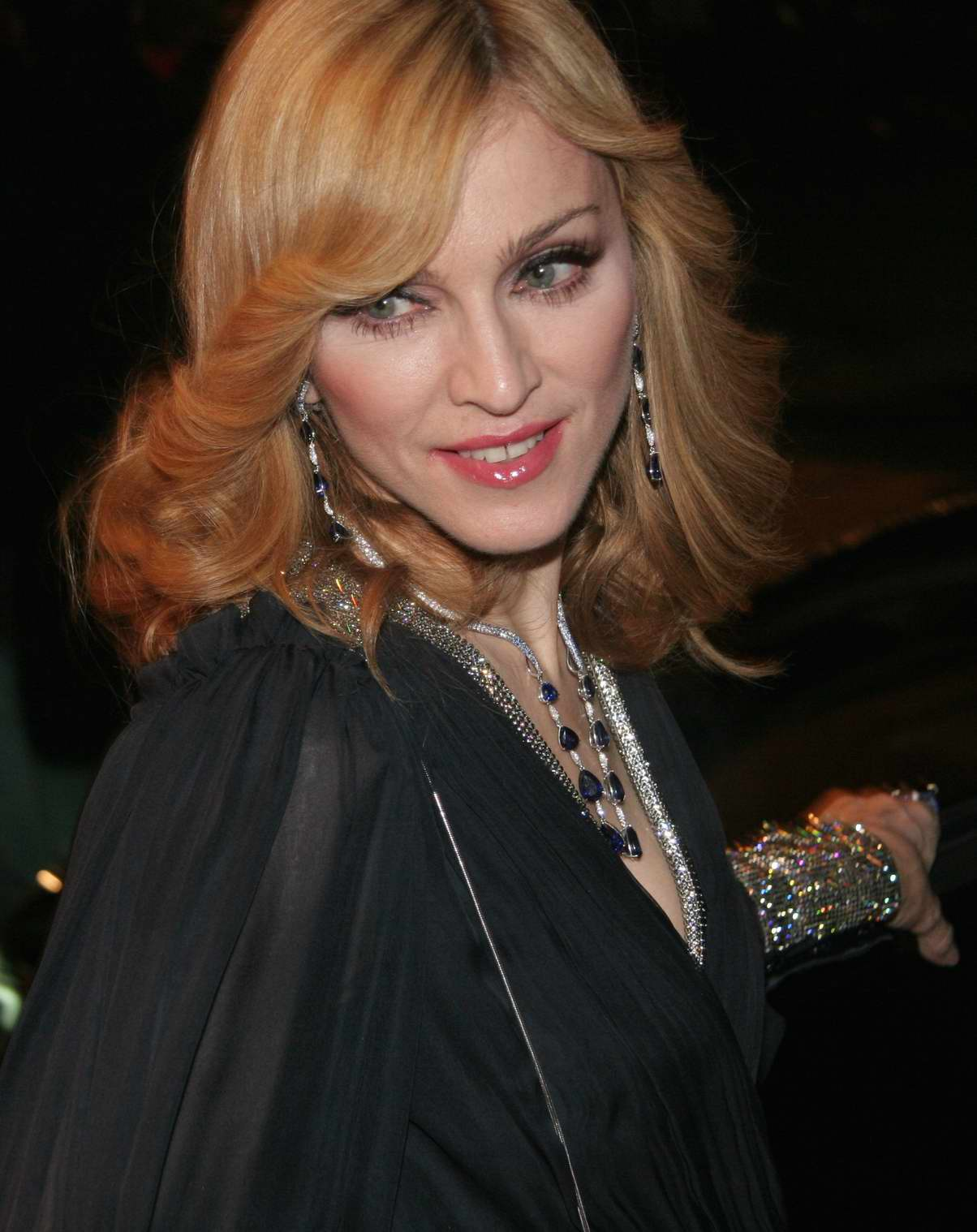
- Madonna promoting her documentary film I'm Going to Tell You a Secret in 2005
- Feature films: 46
- Short films: 15
- Theatrical plays: 3
- Television: 10
- Commercials: 17

Madonna has worked in forty-six feature films (twenty-four narrative films, three documentary films and eighteen concert films), fifteen short films (seven narrative and eight documentary), three theatrical plays, ten television productions (two television films and eight television episodes), and appeared in seventeen commercials. Madonna's acting career has attracted largely mixed reviews and reception at best.

Her first foray documented into screen acting, is a one-minute student film called The Egg (filmed around 1974 or 1976). In 1979, before her breakthrough, she made her acting debut in the low-budget feature A Certain Sacrifice; its release was delayed for several years until 1985 to capitalize on the popularity of her second studio album, Like a Virgin. That same year, she made a cameo appearance as a club singer in the film Vision Quest; and garnered commercial and critical success for the title role in Susan Seidelman's Desperately Seeking Susan, which was her first major screen role. The following year, she made her theatrical debut in David Rabe's Goose and Tom-Tom and her first commercial for Mitsubishi in Japan. She also starred opposite her then-husband actor Sean Penn in the adventure drama Shanghai Surprise (1986), which was panned by critics and earned Madonna her first Golden Raspberry Award for Worst Actress. Her follow-up films Who's That Girl (1987) and Bloodhounds of Broadway (1989) were also critical and commercial failures. She teamed with Pepsi-Cola in 1989 for a commercial to launch the single "Like a Prayer", but the commercial was revoked and her contract with Pepsi cancelled due to controversy surrounding the song's music video.

In 1990, Madonna starred as Breathless Mahoney in Warren Beatty's Dick Tracy, an adaption of Chester Gould's comic strip starring the character of the same name. Starring opposite Beatty and Al Pacino, Madonna received a Saturn Award nomination for Best Actress. The following year, the documentary Madonna: Truth or Dare showcased Madonna behind the scenes of her 1990 Blond Ambition World Tour and became the highest-grossing documentary of all time at that point. She also received positive reviews for her role in the ensemble sports comedy-drama A League of Their Own (1992), which centered on a women's baseball team during World War II. However, her performance in the erotic thriller Body of Evidence was widely panned, and the film was a commercial failure. She cameoed in several films over the next few years, such as Blue in the Face (1995) and Spike Lee's Girl 6 (1996), until starring in the 1996 film adaptation of Andrew Lloyd Webber's musical Evita. Her performance as Eva Perón was acclaimed by critics and won her a Golden Globe Award for Best Actress – Motion Picture Musical or Comedy.

Following a musical comeback in the late 1990s, Madonna again returned to acting with the romantic comedies The Next Best Thing (2000) and Swept Away (2002), the latter of which was a remake of Lina Wertmüller's Italian film of the same name directed by her then-husband director Guy Ritchie. Both films were critical and commercial failures, with Swept Away earning Madonna another Golden Raspberry Award for Worst Actress. She also had a cameo appearance in and performed the theme song of the James Bond film Die Another Day (2002) and guest starred on the NBC sitcom Will & Grace in April 2003. In 2006, she made her final major acting appearance to date with a voice role in Arthur and the Invisibles.

In the 2000s, Madonna has largely moved away from acting to focus on roles behind the camera. She served as executive producer of the teen comedy action film Agent Cody Banks (2003), as well as its sequel the following year. She made her directorial debut with the comedy-drama Filth and Wisdom (2008), and followed up with the biographical film W.E. (2011). Madonna has also focused on projects focusing on artistic freedom and human rights, producing and writing the documentary I Am Because We Are and co-directing the short film secretprojectrevolution (2013) with Steven Klein. She is due to make an guest appearance in the second season of The Studio.

== Feature films ==
=== Narrative films ===
Key
| † | Indicates a cameo appearance |

Madonna narrative film work
| Year | Title | Credited as | | | | | Role | Note(s) | Ref. |
| Year | Title | Actor | Director | Screenwriter | Producer | Executive producer | Role | Note(s) | Ref. |
|---|---|---|---|---|---|---|---|---|---|
| 1985 | Vision Quest | Yes | No | No | No | No | Club singer † | Also known as Crazy for You | |
| 1985 | Desperately Seeking Susan | Yes | No | No | No | No | Susan Thomas | | |
| 1985 | A Certain Sacrifice | Yes | No | No | No | No | Bruna | Filmed in 1979 | |
| 1986 | Shanghai Surprise | Yes | No | No | No | No | Gloria Tatlock | | |
| 1987 | Who's That Girl | Yes | No | No | No | No | Nikki Finn | | |
| 1989 | Bloodhounds of Broadway | Yes | No | No | No | No | Hortense Hathaway | | |
| 1990 | Dick Tracy | Yes | No | No | No | No | Breathless Mahoney | | |
| 1991 | Shadows and Fog | Yes | No | No | No | No | Marie † | | |
| 1992 | A League of Their Own | Yes | No | No | No | No | Mae Mordabito | | |
| 1993 | Body of Evidence | Yes | No | No | No | No | Rebecca Carlson | | |
| 1993 | Dangerous Game | Yes | No | No | No | No | Sarah Jennings | Also known as Snake Eyes | |
| 1995 | Blue in the Face | Yes | No | No | No | No | Singing telegram girl † | | |
| 1995 | Four Rooms | Yes | No | No | No | No | Elspeth | "The Missing Ingredient" segment | |
| 1996 | Girl 6 | Yes | No | No | No | No | Boss No. 3 † | | |
| 1996 | Evita | Yes | No | No | No | No | Eva Perón | | |
| 2000 | The Next Best Thing | Yes | No | No | No | No | Abbie Reynolds | | |
| 2002 | Swept Away | Yes | No | No | No | No | Amber Leighton | | |
| 2002 | Die Another Day | Yes | No | No | No | No | Verity † | | |
| 2003 | Agent Cody Banks | No | No | No | No | Yes | —N/a | | |
| 2004 | Agent Cody Banks 2: Destination London | No | No | No | No | Yes | —N/a | | |
| 2006 | Arthur and the Invisibles | Yes | No | No | No | No | Princess Selenia | Voice | |
| 2008 | Filth and Wisdom | No | Yes | Yes | No | Yes | —N/a | | |
| 2011 | W.E. | No | Yes | Yes | Yes | No | —N/a | | |

=== Documentary films ===
Madonna documentary film work
| Year | Title | Credited as | | | | Ref. |
| Year | Title | Appearance | Screenwriter | Producer | Executive producer | Ref. |
|---|---|---|---|---|---|---|
| 1991 | Madonna: Truth or Dare | Yes | No | No | Yes | |
| 2005 | I'm Going to Tell You a Secret | Yes | No | No | Yes | |
| 2008 | I Am Because We Are | Yes | Yes | Yes | No | |

=== Concert films ===
Madonna concert film work
| Year | Title | Credited as | | | | Note(s) | Ref. |
| Year | Title | Appearance | Screenwriter | Producer | Executive producer | Note(s) | Ref. |
|---|---|---|---|---|---|---|---|
| 1985 | Madonna Live: The Virgin Tour | Yes | No | No | No | Video release. Filmed at Cobo Arena in Detroit. | |
| 1987 | Who's That Girl: Live in Japan | Yes | No | No | No | Television special, later released on video. Filmed at Korakuen Stadium in Tokyo. | |
| 1987 | Ciao Italia: Live from Italy | Yes | No | No | No | Television special (as Madonna in Concerto), later released on video. Filmed at Stadio Comunale in Turin. | |
| 1990 | Blond Ambition – Japan Tour 90 | Yes | No | No | No | Television special, later released on video. Filmed at Yokohama Stadium in Yokohama. | |
| 1990 | Blond Ambition World Tour Live | Yes | No | No | No | Television special, later released on video. Filmed at Stade Charles-Ehrmann in Nice. | |
| 1990 | Madonna: Live! Blond Ambition World Tour 90 from Barcelona Olympic Stadium | Yes | No | No | No | Television special. Filmed at Estadi Olímpic de Montjuïc in Barcelona. | |
| 1993 | The Girlie Show: Live Down Under | Yes | No | No | No | Television special, later released on video. Filmed at Sydney Cricket Ground in Sydney. | |
| 1993 | Madonna: The Girlie Show Live from Fukuoka | Yes | No | No | No | Television special. Filmed at Fukuoka Dome in Fukuoka. | |
| 2001 | Drowned World Tour 2001 | Yes | No | No | Yes | Television special, later released on video. Filmed at The Palace in Auburn Hills. | |
| 2006 | The Confessions Tour | Yes | No | No | Yes | Television special, later released on video. Filmed at Wembley Arena in London. | |
| 2009 | Sticky & Sweet Tour | Yes | No | No | Yes | Television special, later released on video. Filmed at River Plate Stadium in Buenos Aires. | |
| 2013 | MDNA World Tour | Yes | No | No | Yes | Television special, later released on video. Filmed at American Airlines Arena in Miami. | |
| 2016 | Rebel Heart Tour | Yes | No | Yes | No | Television special, later released on video. Filmed at Allphones Arena in Sydney. | |
| 2021 | Madame X | Yes | Yes | Yes | No | Paramount+ special. Filmed at Coliseu dos Recreios in Lisbon. | |
| 2024 | Madonna: The Celebration Tour in Rio | Yes | No | No | No | Television special. Filmed at Copacabana Beach in Rio de Janeiro. | |

== Short films ==
=== Narrative short films ===
Madonna narrative short film work
| Year | Title | Credited as | | | | Medium | Ref. |
| Year | Title | Actor | Director | Screenwriter | Producer | Medium | Ref. |
|---|---|---|---|---|---|---|---|
| 2001 | The Hire: Star | Yes | No | No | Yes | Internet | |
| 2013 | secretprojectrevolution | Yes | Yes | Yes | Yes | BitTorrent | |
| 2017 | Her-Story | Yes | No | No | No | Internet | |
| 2023 | The Enlightenment | Yes | No | No | No | YouTube | |
| 2025 | Funeral Rites | Yes | No | Yes | No | YouTube | |
| 2026 | Confessions II | Yes | No | No | No | YouTube | |

=== Documentary short films ===
Madonna documentary short film work
| Year | Title | Credited as | | Medium | Ref. |
| Year | Title | Appearance | Executive producer | Medium | Ref. |
|---|---|---|---|---|---|
| 1992 | The Making of Sex | Yes | Yes | VHS | |
| 2005 | Confessions on a Promo Tour | Yes | No | AOL | |
| 2006 | Confessions Tour: Behind the Scenes | Yes | No | DVD | |
| 2010 | Sticky & Sweet Tour: Behind the Scenes | Yes | No | DVD | |
| 2012 | Inside the DNA of MDNA | Yes | No | YouTube | |
| 2016 | Qandeel Baloch: A Very Short Story | Yes | No | YouTube | |
| 2019 | World of Madame X | Yes | No | Amazon Prime | |
| 2021 | Madame X Presents: Madame Xtra Q&A | Yes | No | Paramount+ | |

== Theatrical plays ==
Madonna stage work
| Year | Title | Role | Playwright | Stage | Ref. |
|---|---|---|---|---|---|
| 1986 | Goose and Tom-Tom | Lorraine | David Rabe | Lincoln Center Theater | |
| 1988 | Speed-the-Plow | Karen | David Mamet | Royale Theatre | |
| 2002 | Up for Grabs | Loren | David Williamson | Wyndham's Theatre | |

== Television ==
=== Television film ===
Madonna television film appearances
| Year | Title | Credited as | Ref. |
| Year | Title | Executive producer | Ref. |
|---|---|---|---|
| 2004 | 30 Days Until I'm Famous | Yes | |
| 2008 | Alyx | Yes | |

=== Television series ===
Madonna television series appearances
| Year | Title | Role | Episode | Ref. |
|---|---|---|---|---|
| 1985 | Saturday Night Live | Host (Herself); various sketches | "Madonna/Simple Minds" (Season 11, Episode 1) | |
| 1986 | Saturday Night Live | Herself (opening intro) | "Sigourney Weaver/Buster Poindexter" (Season 12, Episode 1) | |
| 1991 | Saturday Night Live | Herself ("Wayne's World" sketch) | "Delta Burke/Chris Isaak" (Season 16, Episode 19) | |
| 1992 | Saturday Night Live | Liz Rosenberg ("Coffee Talk" sketch) | "Roseanne & Tom Arnold/Red Hot Chili Peppers" (Season 17, Episode 14) | |
| 1993 | Saturday Night Live | Marilyn Monroe (opening intro); Musical Guest (Herself) | "Harvey Keitel/Madonna" (Season 18, Episode 11) | |
| 2003 | Will & Grace | Liz | "Dolls and Dolls" | |
| 2009 | Saturday Night Live | Herself ("Deep House Dish" sketch) | "Ryan Reynolds/Lady Gaga" (Season 35, Episode 2) | |
| 2013 | Saturday Night Live | Herself ("The Barry Gibb Talk Show" sketch) | "Jimmy Fallon/Justin Timberlake" (Season 39, Episode 10) | |
| TBA | The Studio | Herself | | |

== Commercials ==
Madonna in commercials
| Year(s). | Company | Promoting | Title | Theme song(s) | Region | Ref. |
|---|---|---|---|---|---|---|
| 1986–1987 | Mitsubishi | Hi-Fi systems/VHS recorders | —N/a | "True Blue"; "La Isla Bonita"; "Causing a Commotion"; "Spotlight" | Japan | |
| 1989 | Pepsi-Cola | Soft drink beverage | "Make a Wish" | "Like a Prayer" | International | |
| 1990 | Rock the Vote | United States elections, 1990 | —N/a | "Vogue" | United States | |
| 1995 | Takara Shuzo | Shochu rice beverage | —N/a | "Broken" (unreleased Madonna song) | Japan | |
| 1999 | Max Factor | Cosmetics | "Max Factor Gold" | "Ray of Light" | International | |
| 2001 | BMW | Automobiles | "Star" | "Song 2" by Blur | International | |
| 2003 | Gap | Clothing | "A New Groove, A New Jean" | "Into the Hollywood Groove" | International | |
| 2003 | Estée Lauder | Fragrance | "Beyond Paradise" | "Love Profusion" | International | |
| 2004 | Radio ZET | Radio station | —N/a | "Music" | Poland | |
| 2005 | Motorola | Motorola ROKR E1 with iTunes phone | "Phone Booth" | "Hung Up" | International | |
| 2007 | H&M | Clothing range | "M by Madonna" | "Purdy" by William Orbit | International | |
| 2007 | Brillia Mare Ariake | Apartment complex | —N/a | —N/a | Japan | |
| 2008 | Sunsilk | Hair care products | "Life Can't Wait" | "Ray of Light"; "4 Minutes" | International | |
| 2010 | Dolce & Gabbana | MDG Sunglasses | —N/a | "Revolver" | Internet | |
| 2012 | Truth or Dare by Madonna | Fragrance | —N/a | "Girl Gone Wild" (Offer Nissim Remix) | International | |
| 2014 | MDNA Skin | Skin Care Products | "Madonna Introduces MDNA Skin" | —N/a | United States | |
| 2023–2024 | Itaú Unibanco | 100 Years of Itaú | "Feito de Futuro" (transl. "Made For The Future") | —N/a | Brazil | |
| 2026 | Dolce & Gabbana | The One fragrance | The One | "La bambola" (Patty Pravo cover) | International | |

== See also ==
- List of highest-grossing concert films
- Madonna videography

== Bibliography ==
- Cross, Mary (2007). Madonna: A Biography. Greenwood Publishing Group. ISBN 978-0-313-33811-3.
- Drucker, Susan J.; Cathcart, Robert S. (1994). American Heroes in a Media Age. VNR AG. ISBN 978-1-881303-19-0.
- Marshall, Corinne (2008). The Q Guide to Will & Grace. Alyson Books. ISBN 978-1-59350-083-2.
- Metz, Allen; Benson, Carol (1999). The Madonna Companion: Two Decades of Commentary. Music Sales Group. ISBN 978-0-8256-7194-4.
- Mooney, Sean (2000). 5,110 Days in Tokyo and Everything's Hunky-dory: The Marketer's Guide to Advertising in Japan. Quorum Books. ISBN 978-1-56720-361-5.
- Morton, Andrew (2002). Madonna. Macmillan Publishers. ISBN 978-0-312-98310-9.
- O'Brien, Lucy (2007). Madonna: Like an Icon. Bantam Press. ISBN 978-0-593-05547-2.
- Rooksby, Rikky (2004). The Complete Guide to the Music of Madonna. Omnibus Press. ISBN 0-7119-9883-3.
- Taraborrelli, Randy J. (2002). Madonna: An Intimate Biography. Simon & Schuster. ISBN 978-0-7432-2709-4.
