= Truth or Dare by Madonna =

American lifestyle brand by Madonna

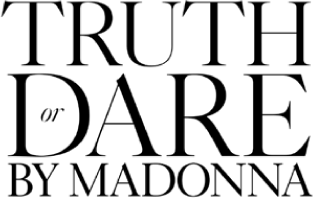
- Product type: Shoes, perfumes,
- Produced by: ALDO Group, Coty
- Country: United States
- Introduced: 2011
- Discontinued: c. 2018; 8 years ago
- Related brands: Kenzo
- Markets: Worldwide
- Ambassador: Madonna

Truth or Dare by Madonna was a lifestyle brand by American singer Madonna. It was the second enterprise from MG Icon LLC, a joint venture between Madonna, her manager Guy Oseary and Iconix Brand Group. This is the second brand from the venture after Material Girl, which is a fashion line designed by Madonna and her daughter Lourdes and launched in 2010. Initially the line launched with handbags, footwear, accessories, intimates and fragrances.

The brand's primary demographic was women in the age range of 27–50 and its commodities would include a variety of apparel. In March 2012, the second product, women's footwear was announced to be launched in the fall of 2012 in association with ALDO Group. The first product released was a perfume of the same name, released by Coty, Inc. and launched in the United States in April 2012 exclusively to Macy's departmental stores, and globally in May 2012. Madonna wanted to create a contemporary version of her mother's fragrance, and collaborated with perfume maker Stephen Nilsen. She collaborated with Fabien Baron on the promotional activities.

== Background ==
In November 2011, Madonna announced plans of launching her own global lifestyle brand, called Truth or Dare by Madonna; it is her second lifestyle brand following Material Girl with her daughter Lourdes. The architect of the brand is "MG Icon" which is a joint venture between Iconix Brand Group Inc., Madonna and her manager Guy Oseary. The chief executive officer of Iconix Brand Group, Neil Cole, felt that there is enough interest behind fashion brands introduced by Madonna. Drawing the example of the Material Girl brand—which was already a commercial success—Cole believed that there would be high demand for a brand that is endorsed solely by Madonna. Truth or Dare would be initially launched with handbags, footwear, accessories, intimates and fragrances. Since the Material Girl clothing was aimed at teenagers, Madonna's target for the brand was women in the age range of 27–50. In an interview with Women's Wear Daily, Madonna stated her inspiration behind the name Truth or Dare:

Over the past several years, I have been approached countless times to create my own brand. The timing is right and I have found great partners in Iconix, who can help translate my vision to reality. I have always been obsessed by fragrance and for years wanted to create something personal that was an expression of me but that other people could relate to as well. Something honest, and yet daring, hence the name Truth or Dare.

== Development ==
Cole said that the first plan for the venture includes launch of fragrance and accessories in 2012. Women's Wear Daily had reported in September 2011 that perfume manufacturing company Coty, Inc. was looking for a possible fragrance deal with Madonna. A press release from the company confirmed the deal and said that the first fragrance for the brand, titled Truth or Dare, will be released in April 2012 exclusively at Macy's in the United States. Global distribution for the product would begin in May 2012. Truth or Dare was confirmed in the press release as a floral perfume, and would be Madonna's first scent to be released. The release also described the blend as a mixture of "narcotic florals, balanced with smells of wood and vanilla." The bottle was described in the release as "playing the Truth or Dare duality – a classic and sophisticated shape, with modern and edgy detailing".

Madonna's inspiration behind the perfume was her late mother. She explained that the oldest memory she cherished about her mother was the perfume she put on. Describing the scent as consisting of gardenias and tuberose, Madonna revealed that she carries that perfume everywhere she goes. To create the particular smell that she had in mind, Madonna collaborated with Stephen Nilsen, who had previously produced fragrances for designers like Tommy Hilfiger, Donna Karan and Tom Ford. After the scent was developed, they believed the finished product to be a modern interpretation of Madonna's mother's perfume. The top note of Truth or Dare consists of essences from gardenia and tuberose, jasmine was embedded in the middle note, and the base was a mixture of vanilla and musk.

== Fragrances ==
According to the CEO of Coty, Inc., Bernd Beetz, promotion for the brand and the perfume included Madonna's feature in print-ads, television, and online marketing campaign; the promotional activities would be produced with Fabien Baron, of Baron & Baron with whom Madonna had previously worked on her 1992 coffee table book, Sex. The print-ad was shot by French Vogue magazine photographers Mert Alas and Marcus Piggott. A number of promotional items accompanied the perfume, namely earrings, lingerie, bracelets and a bottle of Dom Pérignon champagne. Also included was a vase of yellow waterlillies, a gold box, a blindfold designed by French painter Kiki de Montparnasse, and a small vial of the scent. In order to deliver the perfume to beauty editors for review, Madonna hired two handsome male models; one dressed in white and the other in black. The one dressed in white held tuberose and gardenia in his hand, while the otherin black held the white-colored perfume bottle; their costume was supposed to symbolize Madonna's mother and the duality of the perfume name. Gregory DelliCarpini Jr. from Billboard magazine believed Madonna to be fully aware that sexual imagery was still in demand, hence she hired the male models. He concluded by saying, "What better way to pep up a dull day?" In December 2011, the first advertisement for the perfume was revealed. The ad featured Madonna topless, and looking towards the camera with the Truth or Dare perfume bottle in front. The poster was created by re-using images from Madonna's 2010 photoshoot with Interview magazine, which was shot by Alas and Piggott. Jessica Vince from Grazia magazine complimented the ad, describing the singer's look as "recycle chic". The writer continued: "[She] is looking every inch the Hollywood glamazon, topless except for striking lipstick and her trademark crucifix, plus a mass of blonde waves. And no, you haven’t had one too many glasses of mulled wine – that is indeed herself she’s cosying up to."

In December 2012, a second fragrance was announced and titled as Truth or Dare by Madonna: Naked. The press ad campaign featured a naked image of Madonna with a back banner across her breasts with the words "Naked - a new fragrance" on it.

=== Sales ===
In 2012, Madonna earned $60 million for her debut perfume, Truth or Dare.

== Footwear ==
The second product from the brand was announced in March 2012, women's footwear, through ALDO Group. The initial footwear consists of more than 60 styles, including shoes, platform shoes, flats, heels, booties and over-the-knee boots. The product is sold through Nordstrom, ASOS.com and Macy’s in the United States, Selfridges in the UK and Hudson's Bay and Little Burgundy Stores in Canada.

== See also ==
- Madonna fashion brands
- Madonna and business
