= NATO Review =

- Format: online
- Publisher: NATO
- Language: English, French, Polish, Russian, Turkish, Ukrainian
- Website: https://www.nato.int/docu/review/index.html
- ISSN: 0255-3813

NATO Review is a free online magazine offering expert opinion, analysis and debate on a broad range of security issues. It is owned and edited by the North Atlantic Treaty Organization (NATO) and has been published for over 70 years.

== History ==
It was originally published in print as the NATO Letter, but in 1975 became NATO Review. While in print it was a bi-monthly periodical, but now it produces content electronically. The magazine is published by NATO in both English and French, with editions in other NATO Languages. It looks at different aspects of NATO’s role in today’s fast-changing and unpredictable security environment. It also covers wider challenges, such as cyberattacks, hybrid warfare, the impact of social media, the security implications of climate change and scarcity of resources, and the need to strengthen the role of women in peace and security.

Its website states that the magazine does not necessarily represent official opinion or policy of NATO or its member governments.
