= Armin Brott =

American author and radio host

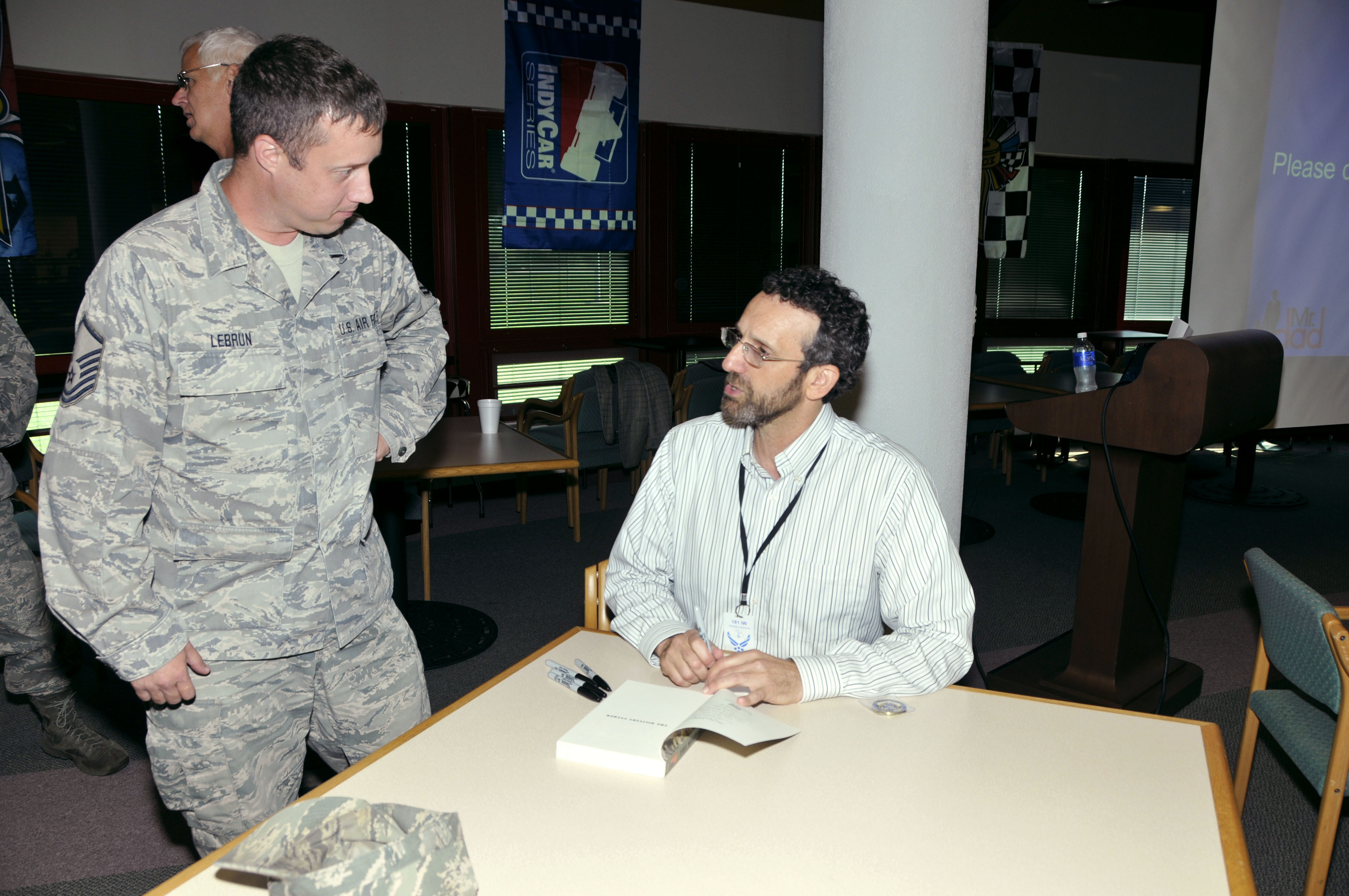
U.S. Air Force Master Sgt. Monty LeBrun, 181st Communications Flight, 181st Intelligence Wing, Indiana Air National Guard, talking with Armin Brott

Armin A. Brott (born August 24, 1958) is an American author, columnist, and radio host.

== Biography ==
Brott was born in Chicago, Illinois, and served in the United States Marine Corps from 1976 to 1978. He received an undergraduate degree from San Francisco State University in 1980, and a Master of Business Administration from the Thunderbird School of International Management in 1982.

Referred to by Time magazine as the "superdad's superdad", Brott has received recognition for his writings on parenting and fatherhood. He writes two nationally syndicated newspaper columns (both for Tribune Content Agency): Ask Mr. Dad, and Healthy Men Today. He also hosts "The Healthy Family Show," which airs on the American Forces Network, where it reaches 1.2 million American service members and their families.

Brott co-founded Healthy Men, Inc., a nonprofit dedication to empowering men and boys to take an active role in their own healthcare and to reimagining the healthcare system in a guy-friendly way, making it more accessible and welcoming to men.

Brott's writing has appeared in dozens of magazines, newspapers, and websites, including Time, Newsweek, The Washington Post, The New York Times Magazine, Men's Health, Redbook, Glamour, Sports Illustrated, Parenting, Huffington Post, DrPhil.com, Yahoo.com, DrLaura.com, and more.

Brott has also been interviewed by more than 500 print publications, television and radio shows, including The Wall Street Journal, The New York Times, The Chicago Tribune, Time, Life, The Times of London, The Today Show, CBS Early Show, Fox News, CNN, Politically Correct, The O'Reilly Factor, and more.

He has three children and lives in Mill Valley, California.

== Publications ==
Books on Fatherhood and Parenting

- The Expectant Father: Facts, Tips, and Advice for Dads-To-Be (also available as an audiobook)
- The New Father: A Dad's Guide to the First Year (also available as an audiobook)
- Fathering Your Toddler: A Dad's Guide to the Second and Third Years
- Fathering Your School-Age Child
- The Single Father: A Dad's Guide to Parenting without a Partner
- Father for Life: A Journey of Joy, Challenge, and Change
- The Military Father: A Hands-on Guide for Deployed Dads
- Throwaway Dads: The Myths and Barriers That Keep Men from Being the Fathers They Want to Be (with Ross Parke)
- The Best Birth (with Sarah McMoyler)

Books on Other Topics

- The 10-Second Internet Manager (with Mark Breier)
- The End of Advertising As We Know It (with Sergio Zyman)
- Renovate Before Your Innovate (with Sergio Zyman)
- The Must-Have Customer (with Robert Gordman)
- The $uper $weet $pot (with Robert Gordman)
- Blueprint for Men's Health (Men's Health Network)
- Your Head: An Owner's Manual (Men's Health Network)
- Heartbeat (Men's Health Network)
- Breathe Easy (Men's Health Network)
- Balance Your Brain, Balance Your Life (with Drs. Jay Lombard and Christian Renna)
