= Oren Harari =

Business professor and author (1949–2010)

Oren Harari (July 30, 1949 – April 10, 2010) was an Israeli-American author and University of San Francisco business professor. He authored several management books, including The Leadership Secrets of Colin Powell, a New York Times, Wall Street Journal and Bloomberg Businessweek bestseller.

== Early life ==
Oren Harari was born to Herbert and Rut Harari in Tel Aviv, Israel, on July 30, 1949. His family moved to San Diego in 1965, where Harari later earned his B.S. degree from San Diego State University and then his doctorate in industrial psychology at the University of California, Berkeley, in 1978.

== Career ==
Soon after obtaining his degree, Harari began teaching at the University of San Francisco. In addition to teaching, Harari worked with Tom Peters to begin lecturing about leadership and business strategy.

In 1989, Harari travelled to Africa for 6 months to live and work. It was this experience that fueled his first book titled Lessons from South Africa, which provided instructions for companies and governments to drive growth in developing countries.

In the 1990s, Harari was teaching global and strategic management at University of San Francisco when he met Nicholas Imperato, his co-author of the book Jumping the Curve: Innovation and Strategic Choice in an Age of Transition. This was a book on business strategy that was later named by Library Journal as one of the best books of 1994.

In 1996, Harari launched an independent career of writing and speaking with Leading Authorities, Inc., a Washington, D.C.–based lecture agency and publisher. Here, Harari became one of the firm's most desired public speakers. It was one year later when his third book, Leapfrogging the Competition: Five Giant Steps to Becoming a Market Leader, was rated as one of the Top Ten business books of 1997 by Management General.

Harari became a columnist for the American Management Association's monthly magazine, Management Review, where he wrote the column Harari at Large. One of his most popular articles was about the leadership principles of Colin Powell. The high demand for reprints as well as a personal phone call of praise from Powell led to a book project. The Leadership Secrets of Colin Powell was published by McGraw-Hill in 2002 and became a New York Times bestseller.

Harari died on April 10, 2010, in his home, of brain cancer. The Harari Conscious Leadership and Social Innovation initiative at the University of San Francisco School of Management is named for him.

== Books ==
- Break From The Pack: How To Compete In A Copycat Economy (FT Press, 2006) is a book that illustrates the importance of companies separating themselves from one another to become successful. The book contains common mistakes that companies make, as well as other marketing tips.
- The Leadership Secrets of Colin Powell (McGraw-Hill, 2002) is a recount of Colin Powell's core beliefs of leadership, negotiation, and self-knowledge.
- Beep! Beep!: Competing In The Age Of The Road Runner (Warner Books, 2000) is a book with tips to adapt to the ever-changing business climate in order to outperform competitors. This book was co-authored by Chip R. Bell.
- Leapfrogging the Competition: Five Giant Steps to Becoming a Market Leader (Prima Publishing, 1999) is a book that contains organizational recommendations to help a business become a leader in the market.
- Jumping the Curve: Innovation and Strategic Choice in an Age of Transition (Jossey-Bass, 1994) is a book written from interviews with business leaders around the world that contains strategies to help companies "jump the curve" to become successful in their market.
