= Warren Allen Smith =

American encyclopedist

Warren Allen Smith (October 29, 1921 – January 9, 2017) was an American writer, humanist and gay rights activist. A World War II veteran and an outspoken atheist, he dubbed himself as "the atheist in a foxhole".

== Biography ==
From 1942 to 1946, Smith served in the U.S. Army. Originally a clerk working in the United States Army Armor School at Fort Knox, Smith landed at "Omaha" beach, Normandy in October 1944. He then served as a high-ranking administrative clerk in France, and helped in the clerical responsibilities of withdrawing US soldiers after the war. Smith insisted that the religious affiliation inscription on his dogtag be Unitarian, and later 'None', instead of the usual P (for Protestant), C (Catholic) or H (Hebrew - Jewish).

In 1961, Smith started the Variety Recording Studio, a major independent company off Broadway, New York City, with his business partner and longtime companion Fernando Rodolfo de Jesus Vargas Zamora. Smith ran the company for almost thirty years (1961–90). In 1969, Smith participated in the Stonewall riots.

Smith was one of the signatories of the 1973 Humanist Manifesto II as well as the Humanist Manifesto III in 2003.

In 2015, Smith took control the website Philosopedia, intended to be a resource for philosophers as well as a comprehensive index of the world's most prominent atheists.

He died on January 9, 2017, at the age of 95.

== Award ==
- Leavey Award, by Freedoms Foundation at Valley Forge 1985 - was awarded $7,500 by architect Charles Luckman as one of fifteen recipients of the annual Leavey Awards, received for a syllabus to teach Adam Smith clubs and classes in high schools.

== Works ==
- Who's Who in Hell: A Handbook and International Directory for Humanists, Freethinkers, Naturalists, Rationalists, and Non-Theists, (NY: Barricade Books, 2000) ISBN 978-1-56980-158-1. The work received a front-page review/interview in The New York Observer and a CNN interview by Jeanne Moos. When the books were all sold, Smith transferred the 1,237 printed pages as the first of the 4,850 philosopedia.org content pages.
- Gossip from Across the Pond: Articles Published in the United Kingdom's Gay and Lesbian Humanist, 1996-2005, New York, N.Y.: chelCpress, 2005. ISBN 978-1-58396-916-8
- 2005 Cruising the Deuce - a serious study of the 1940s to 1980s subculture on New York City's 42nd Street; foreword by Dr. Vern L. Bullough, fellow and former president, Society for the Scientific Study of Sex; copy was requested by the Kinsey Institute; John Waters asked to use the book as a prop in a 2005 movie.
- Celebrities in Hell (NY: ChelCbooks, 2010). ISBN 978-1-56980-214-4 - a listing of contemporary non-revelationists including Woody Allen, Marlon Brando, Marlene Dietrich, Katharine Hepburn, Christopher Reeve, and Frank Zappa.
- In the Heart of Showbiz, A Biographical Triography of Variety Recording Studio, Fernando Vargas, and Warren Allen Smith (NY:ChelCbooks, 2011) - an autobiography

=== Columns ===
- 1994-1998 - "Humanist Potpourri". Free Inquiry; "Paul Cadmus: Artist-Humanist", August 1996
- 1970s - "Manhattan Scene," in St. Thomas' Daily News and twenty other West Indian newspapers

== See also ==
- There are no atheists in foxholes
