= Parag Khanna =

Indian-American specialist in geopolitics and globalization

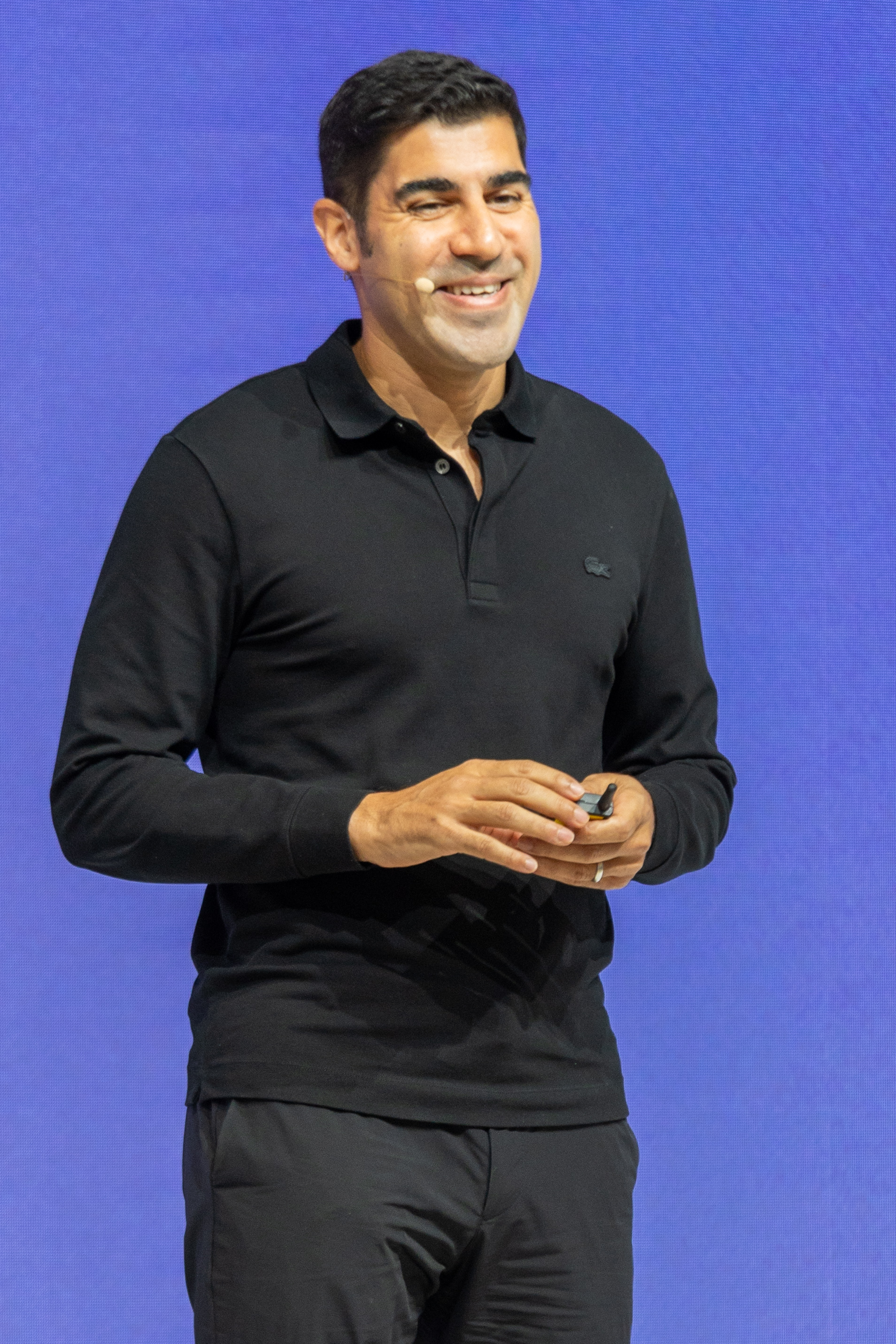
- Born: 27 July 1977 (age 49); Kanpur, India
- Education: Georgetown University (BA, MA); London School of Economics (PhD)
- Spouse: Ayesha Khanna
- Children: 2
- Website: Official website

Parag Khanna is an Indian-born strategy advisor and author. He is Founder and CEO of AlphaGeo, an AI-based geospatial predictive analytics platform.

== Early life and education ==
Khanna was born in Kanpur, India. His childhood was spent between India and the United Arab Emirates before his family moved to New York City. He obtained a Bachelor of Science in international affairs from the School of Foreign Service at Georgetown University, and also a Master of Arts in Security Studies from Georgetown in 2005. In 2010, he received his PhD in international relations from the London School of Economics.

== Government service ==
In 2007, Khanna served as a Senior Geopolitical Advisor to US Special Operations Forces deployed in Iraq and Afghanistan.

== Books ==
Khanna's first book was The Second World: Empires and Influence in the New Global Order. In 2008, Khanna authored an essay adapted from this book in the New York Times Magazine titled "Waving Goodbye to Hegemony".

In 2011, How to Run the World: Charting a Course to the Next Renaissance, Khanna's sequel to The Second World. In the book, he argues that the world is entering a “postmodern Middle Ages” in which global governance takes the form of “mega-diplomacy” among coalitions of public and private actors.

In 2012, Khanna co-authored a book with Ayesha Khanna, called Hybrid Reality: Thriving in the Emerging Human-Technology Civilization. The book presents how humanity is moving beyond the information revolution into a "Hybrid Age" in which technology is incorporated into all aspects of human life. It developed concepts such as "geotechnology" and "Technology Quotient (TQ)".

In 2016, his book Connectography: Mapping the Future of Global Civilization, was the completion of Khanna's trilogy on world order. The book argues that connectivity in the form of transportation, energy and communications infrastructure has brought about a "global network revolution" in which human civilization becomes reorganized according to cities and supply chains more than nations and borders.

In 2017, Amazon CreateSpace published his book Technocracy in America: Rise of the Info-State. It argued that the US government requires a better balance between representation and administration, explored diverse governance systems and proposed an organizational redesign for the US federal government.

In 2019, Khanna published the book The Future is Asian: Commerce, Conflict and Culture in the 21st Century, which analyses the shift in global power location from the West to the continent Asia, and comments on the growing common identity among its collective nations. He examines the reemergence of an "Asian system" after the end of colonialism and Cold War, and how Asia's collective rise impacts geopolitics, economics, and culture, which have all shifted away from US hegemony.

In 2021, Simon & Schuster published MOVE: The Forces Uprooting Us, in which Khanna forecasts the future of human geography in light of colliding megatrends such as demographics, geopolitics, technological automation and climate change.

== Criticism ==
In 2011, editors at The New Republic named him one of the "Most Over-Rated Thinkers" of the year, calling Khanna's book How to Run The World a "self-congratulatory anthology of clichés and platitudes". In the same magazine a year later, Evgeny Morozov was strongly critical of Khanna when he reviewed Hybrid Reality by describing Khanna as an "intellectual impostor" possessed of "contempt for democracy and human rights" and criticising his admiration of authoritarian governments in China and Singapore.

== TED ==
Khanna has participated in multiple TED conferences. In 2009 he gave a keynote talk at TED Global in Oxford, England on "Invisible Maps." He was also a guest host of TED Global 2012, held in Edinburgh, Scotland, whose theme was "Radical Openness." He curated a session of speakers on the theme of "The Upside of Transparency" including Sanjay Pradhan, Beth Noveck, Heather Brooke, Marc Goodman and Deyan Sudjic. In 2016, he spoke at the main TED conference held in Vancouver, Canada, on "how megacities are changing the map of the world."

== Awards ==
Khanna was awarded the OECD Future Leaders Prize in 2002. In 2008, he was named one of Esquire's "75 Most Influential People of the 21st Century", and featured in Wired magazine's "Smart List". He has received research grants from the United Nations Foundation, Smith Richardson Foundation, and Ford Foundation. He is a fellow of the Royal Geographical Society.

== Bibliography ==
- The Second World: Empires and Influence in the New Global Order, Random House, 2008. ISBN 1-4000-6508-9.
- How to Run the World: Charting a Course to the Next Renaissance, Random House, 2011. ISBN 1-4000-6827-4.
- Connectography: Mapping the Future of Global Civilization, New York: Random House, 2016. ISBN 9780812988550, OCLC 962478258
- Hybrid Reality: Thriving in the Emerging Human-Technology Civilization, TED Books, 2012. ISBN 9781937382162
- Technocracy in America: Rise of the Info-State. Kentucky : CreateSpace, 2017. ISBN 9780998232515, OCLC 985104616
- The Future is Asian: Commerce, Conflict and Culture in the 21st Century, New York : Simon & Schuster, 2019. ISBN 9781501196263, OCLC 1083524788
- MOVE: The Forces Uprooting Us. Simon & Schuster, 2021. ISBN 1982168978, ISBN 9781982168971
