= Michael Levine (publicist) =

American writer and public relations expert

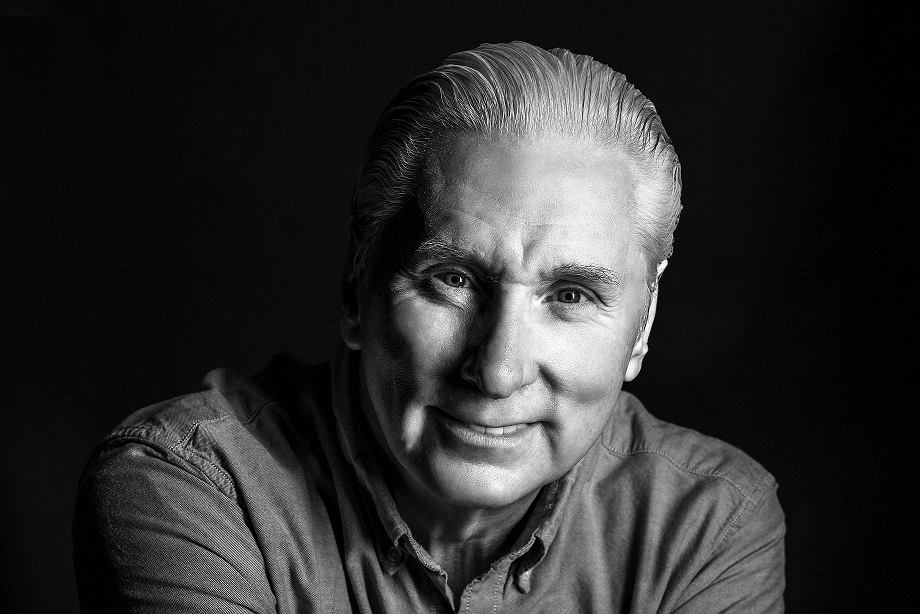
- Michael Levine in 2022.
- Born: New York City
- Occupations: Author, publicist
- Website: Michael Levine official website

Michael Levine is an American writer and public relations expert. He is the author of books on public relations including Guerrilla P.R. He has represented 58 Academy Award winners, 34 Grammy Award winners, and 43 New York Times best-sellers, including Michael Jackson, Barbra Streisand, and George Carlin among many others. Levine also appeared in POM Wonderful Presents: The Greatest Movie Ever Sold, the 2011 documentary by Morgan Spurlock.

Levine has provided commentary including Variety, Forbes, Fox News, The New York Times, and the USA Today. Levine has been referred to in different publications as the "Michael Jordan of entertainment P.R."

== Early life and education ==
Born in New York City Levine was raised in Fort Lee, New Jersey and graduated from Fort Lee High School in 1972. He went on to attend Rutgers University where he dropped out after six months. Levine had a poor childhood and had learning issues due to dyslexia. He describes his mother as an alcoholic and his father as passive; however, he attributes much of his success to both of them for instilling a will to succeed. In his early career after leaving Rutgers, he worked in show business as an impresario.

== Career ==
Levine moved to Los Angeles in 1977 and opened his own public relations firm, Levine Communications Office (LCO), in 1983. He started the firm with a borrowed desk and worked out of the back of a hair salon located in Sherman Oaks, California. In an interview with the Jewish Journal, he described trying to land his first client to "stapl[ing] jelly to the ceiling." His first clients were stand-up comedian David Brenner and actress Joan Rivers. Former Brenner manager Steve Reidman has described Levine as someone who is devoted to his clients. Levine represented celebrity clients including David Bowie, Michael J. Fox, and Michael Jackson.

Levine was Michael Jackson's publicist in 1993 and 1994 during which time Jackson was accused of molesting a 13-year-old by the name of Jordan Chandler. Prior to that time, Levine helped Jackson disseminate the story of Jackson sleeping in a hyperbaric oxygen chamber, a story fabricated by Jackson. In later interviews, Levine described the Jackson molestation accusations as one of the toughest public relations battle that he faced. After Jackson's death in 2009, Levine was interviewed by numerous media outlets about Jackson's conditions through those years. Levine described Jackson's life as a self-destructive journey and was quoted as saying, "His talent was unquestionable, but so too was his discomfort with the norms of the world. A human simply can not withstand this level of prolonged stress."

Levine has represented comedians including George Carlin, Sam Kinison and Rodney Dangerfield. In 2010, he organized a birthday party in honor of then deceased Carlin. The event was attended by celebrities Tom Arnold, Paul Mooney, Paul Rodriguez, Tom Green, Judy Tenuta, Jay Phillips and Shawn Wayans, each of whom held a sign representing Carlin's seven dirty words. Levine also gave commentary on the Laugh Factory incident involving Michael Richards' use of racial slurs during a stand up act in 2006.

=== Writing and public speaking ===
Levine is the author of 19 books. He has spoken at Oxford, UCLA, and Harvard University.

Levine is the creator of a national online newsletter LBN E-lert. The newsletter started with an email list of approximately 500 people with whom Levine had previously worked. It was reported that the newsletter has more than 474,000 subscribers from all 50 states in the U.S. as well as 26 other countries.

Levine's commentary has been sought for numerous incidents involving celebrities, including the molestation controversy involving Josh Duggar that gained national attention in 2015, speaking on Justice with Judge Jeanine in June 2015. He is also the only person who has spoken at Harvard University and the University of Oxford who did not receive a college degree.

== Bibliography ==
Title	Publication date	ISBN, publisher
Broken Windows, Broken Business: How the Smallest Remedies Reap the Biggest Rewards	November 1, 2006	ISBN 9780446698481, Grand Central Publishing
Charming Your Way to the Top: Hollywoods Premier P.R. Executive Shows You How to Get Ahead	January 1, 2004	ISBN 9781422368022, Lyons Press
Guerrilla PR Wired : Waging a successful publicity campaign online, offline, and everywhere in between	February 11, 2003	ISBN 9780071382328, McGraw-Hill
A branded world: Adventures in public relations and the creation of superbrands	March 3, 2003	ISBN 9780471263661, Wiley
