= Warwick Murray =

British–New Zealand academic, musician and songwriter

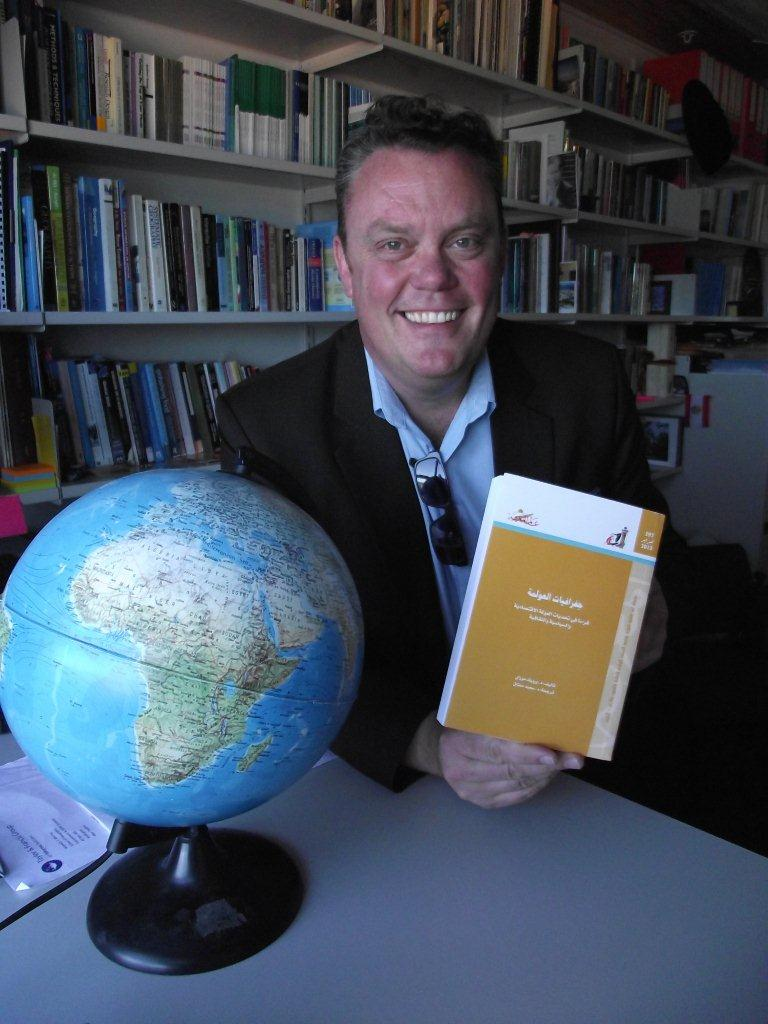
- Murray in 2013
- Born: 1972 (age 53–54); Edgbaston, Birmingham, England
- Education: University of Birmingham
- Occupations: Academic, musician
- Known for: Development geography, music

Warwick Murray (born 1972) is a British–New Zealand academic, singer-songwriter, and multi-instrumentalist, known for his research in human geography and development studies, and for his musical recordings with The Fabulous Murray Brothers, Funky Jandal, and as a solo artist.

== Early life and education ==
Murray was born in Edgbaston, Birmingham and raised in Hereford, England, where he completed his secondary education. He studied at the University of Birmingham, graduating in 1993 and completing a doctorate there in 1997.

== Academic career ==
Murray held academic posts at the University of the South Pacific and Brunel University in the UK. He joined Victoria University of Wellington (VUW), New Zealand, in 2001 and was appointed Professor of Human Geography and Development Studies in 2010. He retired in October 2023. Since November 2023, he has taught human geography at Durham University, UK.

Murray has held visiting posts at the University of Cambridge, the University of Oxford, and Pontificia Universidad Católica de Chile.

=== Awards and honours ===
In 2006 he received a New Zealand National Tertiary Teaching Award for Sustained Excellence. In 2007 he received the NZGS President’s Award for Teaching Excellence and, in 2015, the President’s Award for Excellence in Graduate Supervision. In 2019 he was awarded the Distinguished New Zealand Geographer Medal.

=== Editorial and professional service ===
Editor-in-chief of Asia Pacific Viewpoint (2002–2010, 2016–2020). Founder of Victoria Institute for Links with Latin America (2007). Vice-President (2017–19) and President (2020–21) of NZGS.

=== Media appearances ===
Contributor to TVNZ and RNZ on international development and Latin American affairs. RNZ programmes include Summer Nights and Nights.

== Research and publications ==
Murray’s research focuses on development, rural and economic geography, with emphasis on Latin America, Pacific Islands, Asia–Pacific, and New Zealand. Key works include *Geographies of Globalization* and *Aid and Development* (co-authored with John Overton).

== Selected publications ==
Warwick Murray’s academic work spans economic geography, development studies, globalisation, aid, and political economy.

=== Books ===
- Murray, Warwick E., Howson, Kelle, and Overton, John (eds.) (2022). Ethical Value Networks in International Trade: Social Justice, Sustainability and Provenance in the Global South. Cheltenham: Edward Elgar Publishing. ISBN 9781800374492.
- Overton, John and Murray, Warwick E. (2020). Aid and Development. London: Routledge. ISBN 9780367414849.
- Overton, John; Murray, Warwick E.; Prinsen, Gerard; Ulu, Tagaloa Avataeao Junior; and Wrighton, Nicola (2018). Aid, Ownership and Development: The Inverse Sovereignty Effect in the Pacific Islands. London: Routledge. ISBN 9780367000523.
- Murray, Warwick E. and Overton, John (2014). Geographies of Globalization (2nd ed.). London: Routledge. ISBN 9780415567626.

=== Articles ===
- Murray, Warwick E. and Overton, John (2016). “Retroliberalism and the new aid regime of the 2010s.” Progress in Development Studies, 16(3): 244–260. doi:10.1177/1464993416641576.
- Overton, John and Murray, Warwick E. (2016). “Fictive place.” Progress in Human Geography, 40(6): 794–809. doi:10.1177/0309132515625464.
- Murray, Warwick E. and Overton, John (2011). “Neoliberalism is dead, long live neoliberalism?” Progress in Development Studies, 11(4): 307–318.
- Murray, Warwick E. (2006). “Neo-feudalism in Latin America? Globalisation, agribusiness, and land re-concentration in Chile.” The Journal of Peasant Studies, 33(4): 645–680.
- Murray, Warwick E. (2001). “The second wave of globalisation and agrarian change in the Pacific Islands.” Journal of Rural Studies, 17(2): 135–148.

=== Research profiles ===
- ORCID
- [Google Scholar]

== Music career ==
Singer-songwriter and multi-instrumentalist. His show The Singing Geographer aired on RNZ 2012–13.

== Warwick Murray discography ==
Warwick Murray has released a number of albums and EPs both as a solo artist and as a member of various bands, several of which have charted on the Official Aotearoa Albums Chart, the Independent Music NZ Top 20 Albums Chart, and Apple Music Blues charts internationally.

=== Albums and EPs ===
Year	Title	Artist	Label	Official Aotearoa Albums (peak)	IMNZ Albums Chart (peak)	Apple Music Blues Chart	Notes
2017	Paekakariki Moon	Warwick Murray	Emerald Hills	—	18	Charted (Worldwide)	IMNZ Top 20 Albums Chart
2017	That’s All We’ve Got Time For	Strait Shooters	Refried Audio	20	12	Charted (Worldwide)	Official NZ Albums Chart (now Aotearoa Music Charts)
2018	Sing It Chap!	The Fabulous Murray Brothers	Refried Audio / Emerald Hills	6	5	Charted (Worldwide)	IMNZ peak contemporaneous with Official chart run
2019	Nada Más Que Blues	The Blues Machine	Rokarolla Records / JC Blues Música	—	—	#45 (Chile)	Apple Music Blues Chart (Chile)
2019	Far Too Long – Thirty Years Together	The Murray Brothers and Friends	Emerald Hills	—	—	—	Non-charting anniversary release
2020	The Emerald Hills EP	Warwick Murray	Emerald Hills	14	8	Charted (Worldwide)	EP release
2021	Smile	The Murray Brothers	Emerald Hills	12	2	Charted (Worldwide)	IMNZ Top 20 Albums Chart
2021	See You at the End Boys	Funky Jandal and the Murray Brothers	Emerald Hills	14	2	Charted (Worldwide)	Collaborative release
2022	Falling Gently	Warwick Murray	Emerald Hills	—	Top 20	Charted (Worldwide)	Available on Apple Music
2022	Golden One	Warwick Murray	Emerald Hills	—	—	Charted (Worldwide)	Did not chart on Official Aotearoa or IMNZ

== Personal life ==
Murray lived in Wellington, New Zealand until October 2023 and now resides near Cambridge, UK.
