= Madonna fashion brands =

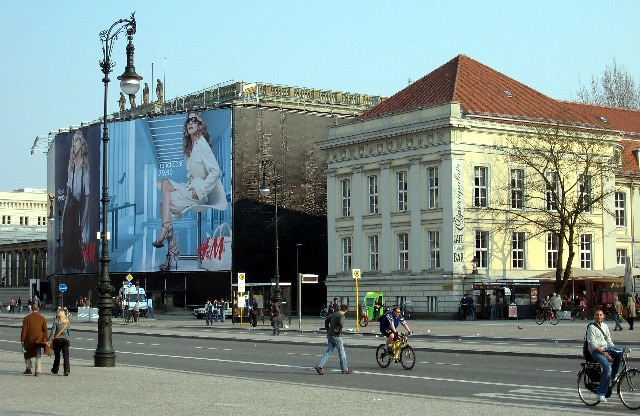
An advertisement of M by Madonna in Germany.

American entertainer Madonna has produced five fashion brands, beginning with a clothing range for fashion store H&M in March 2007. She later created an enterprise, MG Icon LLC, a joint venture with her manager Guy Oseary and Iconix Brand Group which produces her lifestyle brands Material Girl and Truth or Dare by Madonna. She also collaborated with Dolce & Gabbana on a range of sunglasses which marked the first co-branded collaboration that the design duo has ever undertaken.

Prior to creating her own fashion lines, in 1985 at the height of Madonna's fame, Macy's department store created a section called Madonnaland in New York. It was established to coincide with her Radio City Music Hall concerts as part of The Virgin Tour. They sold clothing and jewelry resembling those worn by the singer at the time and held a look-alike contest in the store.

== M by Madonna ==
In March 2007, Madonna collaborated with fashion retailer H&M to produce the fashion line M by Madonna. She had previously modeled for their 2006 campaign which involved herself and crew from the 2006 Confessions Tour and had designed a tracksuit which was worn in the advertisements. The collection consisted of leather trench coats, sequined shift dresses, cream-colored calf-length pants and matching cropped jackets. H&M said the collection reflected Madonna's "timeless, unique and always glamorous style." Madonna also directed the television commercial to advertise the collection. The collaboration involved H&M's head of design, Margareta Van Den Bosch and Madonna commented "I've made no secret of my love for fashion and trends. Working with Margareta and H&M was an exciting and new creative challenge for me. I'm really happy with the results and look forward to wearing M by Madonna along with the rest of the world."

== MDG ==
In March 2010, Madonna collaborated with fashion designers Dolce & Gabbana to produce a range of sunglasses named MDG (their initials). It marked the first co-branded collaboration that the design duo has ever undertaken. The collaboration generated headlines internationally.

They commented on the collaboration: "We're so excited. Designing an eyewear line with Madonna was a new experience for us. This further strengthens our relationship with Madonna, and it was a very constructive experience for us. She is very exacting and a professional who seeks perfection in everything she does, and this was no exception. The oversized and wraparound designs are sexy and very feminine, like our clothes. Madonna's creative contribution and unique point of view were key, even in designing the MDG logo".

== Material Girl ==
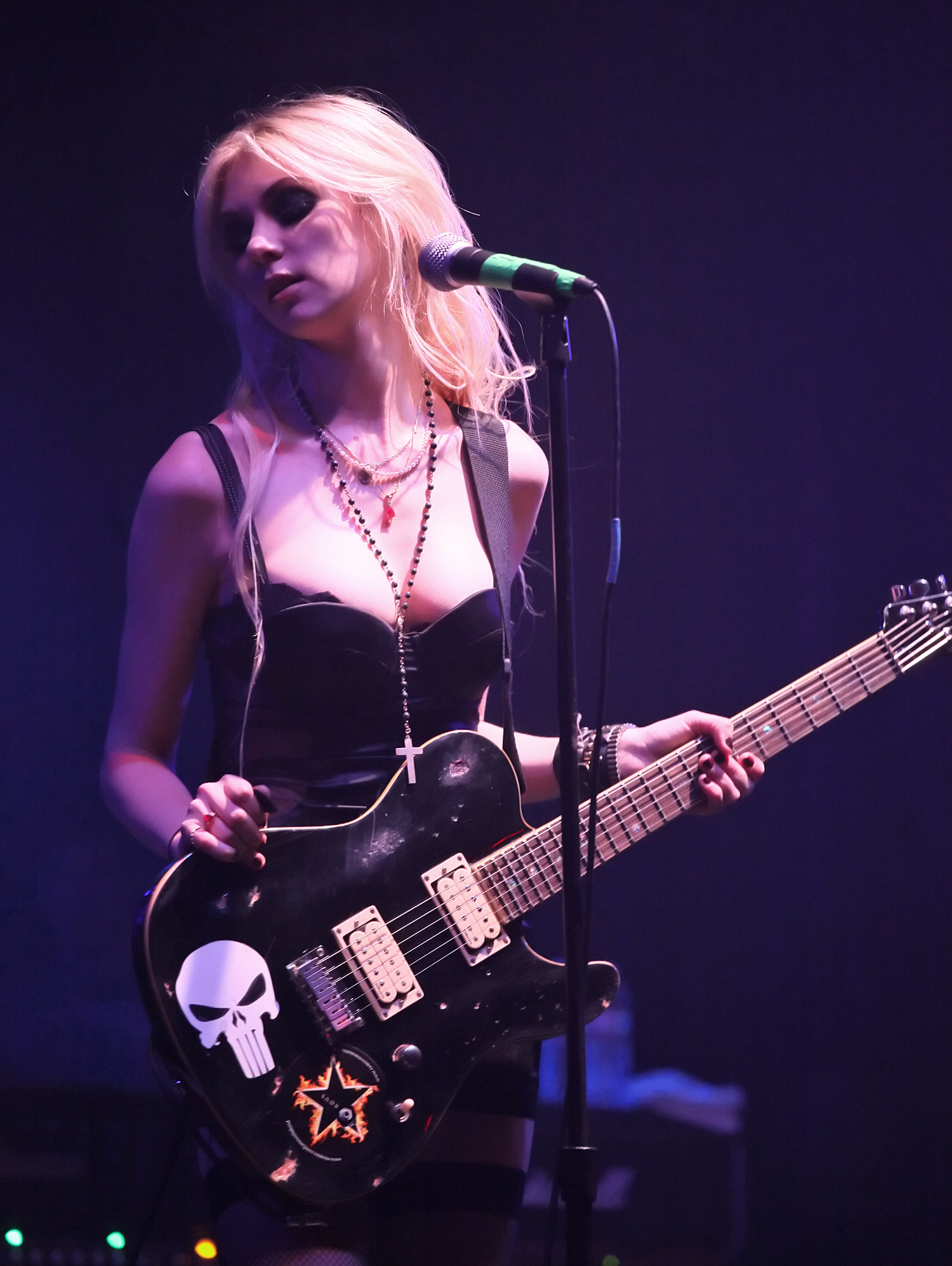
Taylor Momsen was the first face of Material Girl.

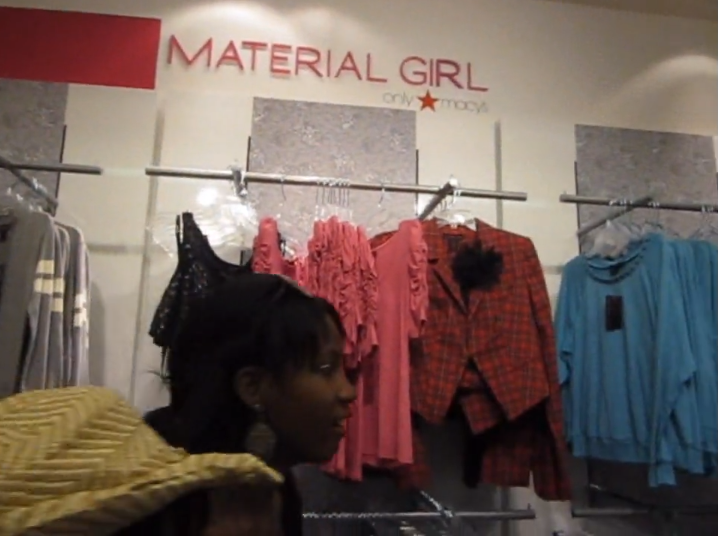
Macy's Material Girl line on its opening day in New York City

In August 2010, Madonna and her daughter, Lourdes Ciccone Leon, launched the teenage fashion brand Material Girl, named after her 1985 single of the same name.

Sold exclusively at Macy's stores, prior to the line, their New York department store created a section called Madonnaland in 1985. It was established to coincide with her Radio City Music Hall concerts as part of The Virgin Tour. They sold clothing and jewelry resembling those worn by the singer at the time and held a look-alike contest in the store. This look would later inspire the Material Girl collection.

The inaugural day drew crowds in New York City, as Madonna personally attended. Terry Lundgren, chairman of Macy's also recalled, "We've had 700 million Internet impressions since the collaboration was announced". It was also Macy's first foray into a "fully-integrated brand with footwear, jewelry and accessories".

Taylor Momsen was chosen to be the face of the brand. In 2011, she was replaced by Kelly Osbourne. Other faces of the brand include: Georgia May Jagger, Rita Ora, Zendaya, Sofia Richie, and Pia Mia.

=== Name lawsuit ===
Madonna was sued over copyright of the name of the collection by LA Triumph, a Los Angeles-based clothing retailer that claims to have been selling "Material Girl" clothing since 1997 and has a registered trademark. In response, the singer attempted to get the lawsuit tossed by presenting evidence she created a hit song that brought "Material Girl" to fame more than 25 years ago. In court papers, Madonna said she is the Material Girl, and she was the first user starting in 1985. California Judge S. James Otero wasn't convinced and commented "[The] Defendants' argument that Madonna created the 'Material Girl' mark through her performances fails as a matter of law," the judge writes in an order denying summary judgment. "This Court and other courts have recognized that the singing of a song does not create a trademark." The judge also rejected arguments that $85 million worth of "Material Girl" related merchandise sales in the 1980s is enough to establish being the "senior trademark user" because concert paraphernalia doesn't strictly equate to clothing sales.

== Truth or Dare by Madonna ==
In November 2011, Madonna announced plans of launching her own global lifestyle brand, called Truth or Dare by Madonna; her second lifestyle brand following Material Girl with her daughter Lourdes and second enterprise involving MG Icon and Macy's. It was announced with a range of handbags, footwear, accessories, intimates and fragrances lines. Madonna's target for the brand was women in the age range of 27–50.

In an interview with Women's Wear Daily, Madonna stated her inspiration behind the name Truth or Dare: "Over the past several years, I have been approached countless times to create my own brand. The timing is right and I have found great partners in Iconix, who can help translate my vision to reality".

=== Fragrances ===
Her first brand product was a homonymous perfume, about which Madonna stated: "I have always been obsessed by fragrance and for years wanted to create something personal that was an expression of me but that other people could relate to as well. Something honest, and yet daring, hence the name Truth or Dare". It was a collaboration with Coty, and the scent was inspired by her mother; she said: "My oldest memory of my mother is her perfume". The advertising campaign featured Madonna topless, and looking towards the camera with the Truth or Dare perfume bottle in front. The poster was created by re-using images from Madonna's 2010 photoshoot with Interview magazine, which was shot by Mert and Marcus.

In December 2012, a second fragrance was announced, Truth or Dare by Madonna: Naked. The press ad campaign featured a naked image of Madonna with a back banner across her breasts with the words "Naked — a new fragrance" on it.

In October 2020, Madonna announced on Instagram a limited edition third fragrance, titled 'Madame X,' in line with her 2019 album, Madame X. This was in collaboration with London-based company, IIUVIO. Madame X Eau de Parfum's notes are Orange Blossom, Cinnamon and Raspberry; middle notes are Patchouli, Rose and Orange Blossom; base notes are Incense, Musk and Amber. This was to capture the essence Mediterranean coast, while mystical and mysterious elements are taken from the East. The packing and bottle design is minimal, with a red or black X stamped on the products.

=== Other products ===
The footwear line was produced with ALDO Group. The initial footwear consists of more than 60 styles, including flats, heels, booties and over-the-knee boots. The product was announced to be sold in Nordstrom, ASOS.com and Macy's in the United States, Selfridges in the UK and The Bay and Little Burgundy Stores in Canada.

== MDNA Skin ==
MDNA Skin is a range of skin care products which were released in Japan on February 12, 2014. The premiere took place at Omotesando, Tokyo, and the product was developed in collaboration with MTG Co. Ltd, one of the foremost beauty care product developers in Japan. Madonna had previously released a picture on her Instagram account where she posed on her bathroom floor, while a caption said the following: "She's done for the day! Bath or shower? #MDNASKIN." The link from the hashtag connected to the official website for MDNA Skin. An exclusive release took place at a store on February 13, 2014, following a country-wide availability from February 26. The skin care ranges available included a serum—exclusively created for Madonna—for obtaining a glow effect on the skin, a chrome induced clay mask for enrichment of the skin as well as a skin rejuvenator which helps to eradicate impurity. As stated in Madonna's official website, the main motto of the product was to "challenge women and their awareness about the art of beauty and skin care. The MDNA Skin pop-up store will give customers the opportunity to see, feel and experience the products and enjoy the multiple screen projected visuals." Michelle Peck, who had been appointed as Madonna's skin advisor for the last ten years, was enlisted as the brand ambassador for the product and helped.

=== Expansion ===
Following its Japanese launch in 2014, the brand was released in Hong Kong, Taiwan and South Korea. By 2017, the brand has expanded to United States, where she promoted it on Jimmy Fallon show. She made a series of promotional videos, and one of them accompanied with Josh Ostrovsky ("The Fat Jewish"). She also stated: "I'm tired of hearing people complain here that they can't get it in America".

In 2017, it was also announced an intention to expand the brand in 2020 to other countries such as China, United Kingdom, France and Italy.

== Commercial reception ==
=== Sales and earnings ===
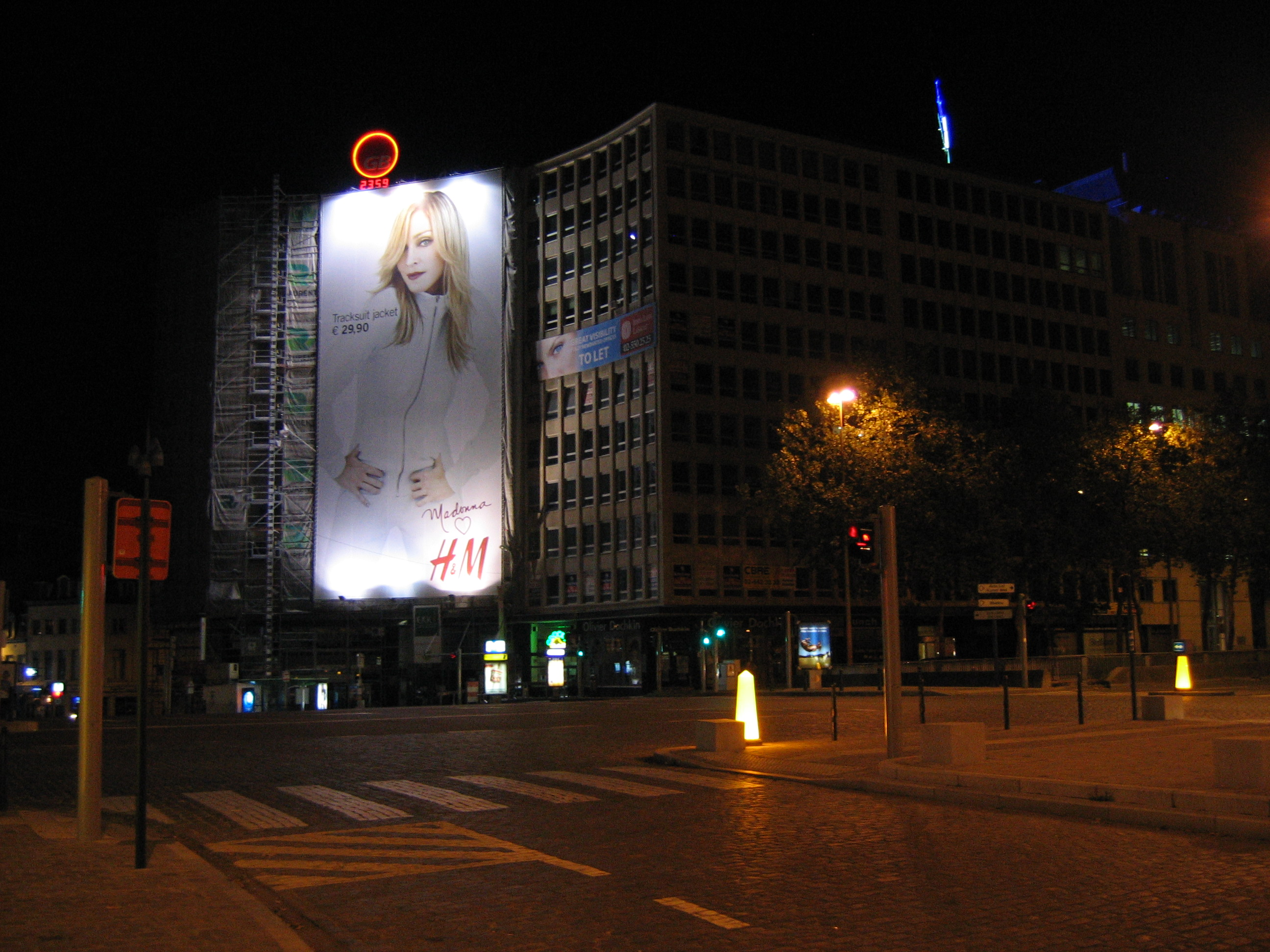
H&M's ads featuring Madonna in European cities Prague and Brussels

M by Madonna helped raise H&M's revenue in its first month, and an estimated 15% during its first year. The company stated: "The M by Madonna collection was present in all 1,300 stores and drove impressive revenue growth in the first 10 days after the launch. Notably the previous designer collections were typically only in 250 stores". Billboard reported that Madonna earned $4 million, and at least collection's sales—which was broader than most— reached $20 million. However, Pamela Church Gibson of the London College of Fashion wrote the clothes "were not particularly successful", while another editor commented it was "one of the less popular of H&M's designer collaborations".

Her Macy's' 2010 line, Material Girl, was included as one of the reasons for the company's revenue jump compared to the previous year. Before the official launch, Madonna and Guy Oseary had already been paid $20 million for its 50 percent stake. MDNA Skin was well received in Japan upon its launch. Both Madonna and Cristiano Ronaldo's enterprises, made Tsuyoshi Matsushita, the owner of MTG Co. a billionaire.

In 2012, according to some media reports, Madonna earned $60 million for her debut perfume, Truth or Dare and an estimated $10 million for her Material Girl clothing line and shoe line. According to Billboard, the footwear line sold out in London, with Helen Attwood from Selfridges referring as their "most commercially successful footwear pop-up" of the year up to July. This also prompted the company to call as "the most successful celebrity endorsement Selfridges has ever hosted".

=== Accolades ===
Madonna's fashion brands have earned some accolades, particularly her MDNA Skin line. Commercials for the MDNA Skin were awarded at the 2018 Shorty Awards, in Branded Content, and Cynopsis Short Form Video from Cynopsis Media. Products of MDNA Skin also received recognition from ceremonies such as AllureBeauty Awards, Marie Claire Hong Kong Beauty Awards, Prestige Hong Kong, Cosmopolitan Hong Kong Beauty Awards, Women's Weekly Singapore, Her World, InStyle, and various Harper's Bazaars Beauty Awards.

== See also ==
- Fashion of Madonna
  - Madonna wannabe
  - Madonna impersonator
- Madonna and business

== Book sources ==
- Church Gibson, Pamela (2013). Fashion and Celebrity Culture. Berg Publishers. ISBN 978-0857852311.
