= Ilkka Ronkainen =

Ilkka A. Ronkainen (born 1940s) is a Finnish/American organizational theorist and Emeritus Professor at the Georgetown University, known for his work on international marketing and international business.

== Life and work ==
Ronkainen studied at the Helsinki School of Economics, where he obtained his BS in Marketing, and his MS in Marketing and English. He then moved to the University of South Carolina, where he obtained his MBA and his PhD.

After his graduation in 1981 started his academic career at the Georgetown University, where he was appointed Professor of International Business and Marketing. He was founding director of the School of Business’s summer program in Hong Kong. He has been Visiting Professor at the Helsinki School of Economics.

His 2008 book "The Global Marketing Imperative: positioning your company for the new world of business" received the Choice award given to the best research books of the year.

== Selected publications ==
- Czinkota, M. R., Ronkainen, I. A., Moffett, M. H., Marinova, S., & Marinov, M. (2009). International business (Vol. 4). Dryden Press.
- Czinkota, Michael, and Ilkka Ronkainen. International marketing. Cengage Learning, 2012.

Articles, a selection:

- Harvey, Michael G., and Ilkka A. Ronkainen. "International Counterfeiters-Marketing Success Without the Cost and the Risk." Columbia Journal of World Business 20.3 (1985): 37-45.
- Johansson, Johny K., Ilkka A. Ronkainen, and Michael R. Czinkota. "Negative country-of-origin effects: The case of the new Russia." Journal of International Business Studies (1994): 157-176.
