= Michael Czinkota =

American international business and trade theorist

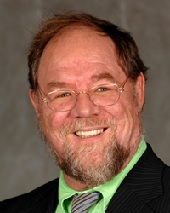
Michael R. Czinkota

Michael R. Czinkota (1951 – November 23, 2022) was an American international business and trade theorist and a longtime Professor at the McDonough School of Business at Georgetown University.

Czinkota is the former Deputy Assistant Secretary of Commerce in the United States Department of Commerce (1987–1989) and a former head of U.S. delegation for Organisation for Economic Co-operation and Development (OECD) Industry Committee in Paris (1987–1989). From 1986 to 1987, Czinkota was a Senior Advisor for Export Controls in the U.S. Department of Commerce. Czinkota was awarded the Significant Contribution to Global Marketing award from the American Marketing Association in 2007.

Professor Czinkota was a prolific author of 140 academic papers, numerous books (including a well-known marketing textbook with his frequent collaborator, Professor Ilkka Ronkainen), and has written for newspapers such as The Washington Times, The Korea Times, Japan Today, Ovi Magazine, The Sri Lanka Guardian, and Handelsblatt. Professor Michael Czinkota died on November 23, 2022, in Virginia.

== Biography ==
=== Education ===
Born and raised in Germany, Czinkota studied in Austria, Scotland, Spain, and the United States. In 1974, Czinkota graduated from the University of Erlangen-Nuremberg with Vordiplom Business Administration and Law as his major. Upon graduating from the University of Erlangen-Nuremberg, he was awarded a two-year Fulbright Scholarship. Czinkota holds an M.B.A. in International Business and a Ph. D in International marketing and Logistics from The Ohio State University.

=== Academic career ===
Since 1980, Czinkota has been a faculty of marketing and international business in McDonough School of Business which is one of four undergraduate schools and one of five graduate schools at Georgetown University. Czinkota has written several International Business textbooks such as International Business (8th Edition), International Marketing (10th Edition), The Global Marketing Imperative, and Mastering Global Markets. His books have been translated into Spanish and Japanese. Since 2007, he has also been a professor (chair) at Birmingham Business School, University of Birmingham.

Since 2009, Czinkota has kept a blog on international business. The content ranges from international jeopardy questions to more than 50 video communications in international business. The blog has been named as one of the 50 best blogs by business professors. Czinkota has also been cited as a top marketing professor on Twitter by social media magazine.

In 2011, he received two significant honors in Peru. He received a Doctor Honoris Causa degree (his third) for his work in International Business and Marketing. Second, it was announced by the Universidad Ricardo Palma that its new School of Global Marketing and Business is named after Czinkota. He also received the Business Book Award from the American Library Association for "The Global Marketing Imperative".

=== Government Service ===
While serving the United States Department of Commerce, Czinkota supervised the Office of Trade and Investment Analysis, the Office of Industry Assessment, the Office of Trade Finance, the Office of Program and Resource Management, and the Office of Industrial Trade. He was also the head of the U.S. Delegation to the Organisation for Economic Co-operation and Development, a representative to the Committee on Foreign Investment in the United States, and was a member of the coordinating committee for Export Controls. He was responsible for Trade Forecasting, Export Control of Services, third-country Export Control Initiative, policy positions on International Financial and Monetary Affairs, as well as secretarial testimony on trade issues. His government publications include: "The Stat-USA Companion to International Marketing", "International Marketing and Accessibility", and "Agricultural Marketing: Export Opportunities for Wood Products in Japan Call for Customer Focus". Czinkota has testified 12 times before the US Congress.

== Selected publications ==
- Czinkota, Michael R. Export development strategies: US promotion policy. Praeger, 1982.
- Czinkota, Michael R., et al. International business. Vol. 4. Dryden Press, 2009.
- Czinkota, Michael, and Ilkka Ronkainen. International marketing. Cengage Learning, 2012.

Articles, a selection:

- Czinkota, Michael R., and Wesley J. Johnston. "Segmenting US firms for export development." Journal of Business Research 9.4 (1981): 353-365.
- Kotabe, Masaaki, and Michael R. Czinkota. "State government promotion of manufacturing exports: a gap analysis." Journal of international business studies (1992): 637-658.
- Czinkota, Michael R., Dickson, Peter. "Securing America's International Business Future". Marketing News - American Marketing Association (March 2016).
