= Madonna and contemporary arts =

Aspect of Madonna's career

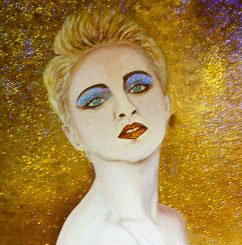
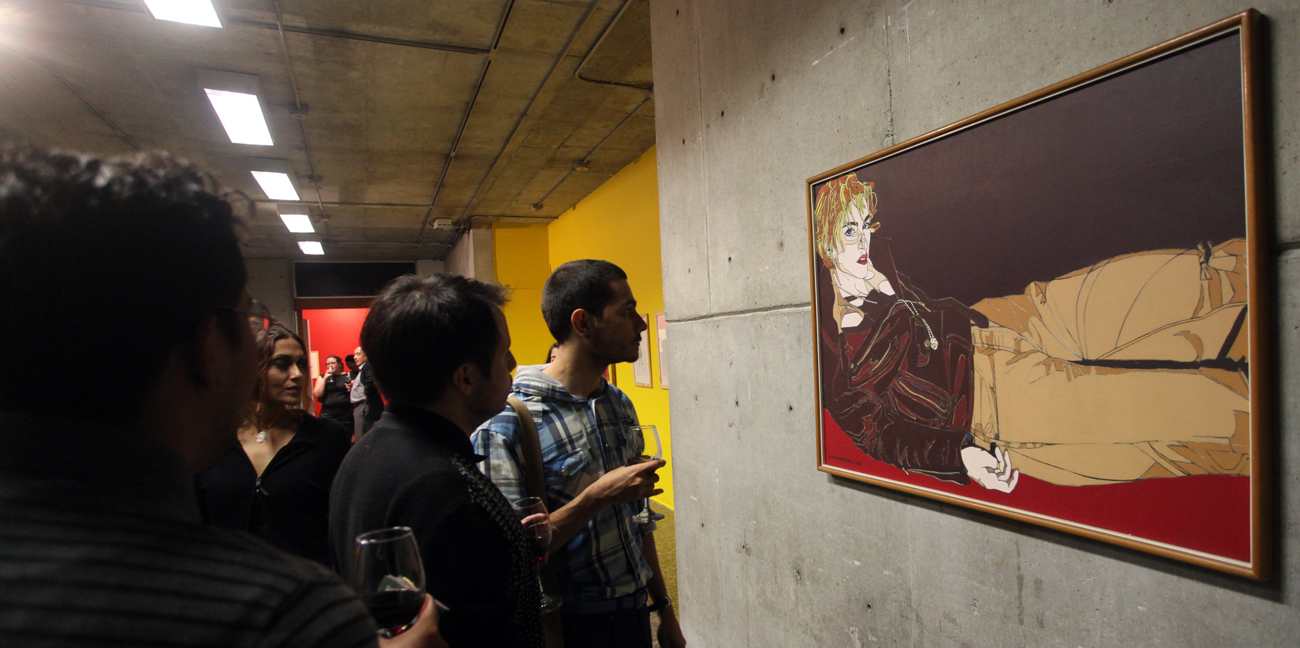
Top, a painting of Madonna, c. 2001, and bottom, observers contemplating one of Javier Restrepo's Madonnas on display at EAFIT University's art centre in 2012

The contributions and influence of American artist Madonna (born 1958) in the landscape of underground and contemporary arts have been documented by a variety of sources such as art publications, scholars and art critics. As her footprints in the arts are lesser-known compared to her other roles, this led a contributor from W to conclude that both her impact and influence in the art world have been "made almost entirely behind the scenes". She is noted for taking inspiration from various painters in her career. Once called a "continuous multi-media art project" by Jon Pareles in 1990, art critics and academics have noted she condenses fashion, dance, photography, sculpture, cinema, music, video and painting in her own artwork.

Madonna's interest in the arts began in her early life. When she moved to New York City to pursue a career in modern dance, she befriended and dated various plastic artists, including Andy Warhol, Martin Burgoyne, Keith Haring and her boyfriend Jean-Michel Basquiat. Around that time, Madonna's graffiti tag was "Boy Toy", which later used in her professional career, and immortalized their friendship in the song "Graffiti Heart".

Madonna is an art collector, included among Art & Antiques' 100 Biggest Collectors. She has been also known as an "art supporter" and has used art for charity. In 2001, Madonna lent her Self-Portrait with Monkey by Frida Kahlo at the Tate Modern, which was the first British exhibition dedicated to Kahlo. Madonna sponsored various art exhibitions of contemporary artists such as Basquiat, Cindy Sherman and Tina Modotti. Her other activities include to co-initiate "Art for Freedom" in 2012, runs the artistic installation X-STaTIC Pro=CeSS (2003) and create the NFT digital artworks, "Mother of Creation" along with Mike Winkelmann ("Beeple") in 2022.

Throughout her career, her visuals and artistry have attracted both celebratory and derogatory commentaries. Late-twentieth-century views on Madonna were a constant amid low and high culture, with some labeling her a modernist. By the next century, Dahlia Schweitzer said that many critics have long resisted using the words "Madonna" and "artistic" in the same sentence, and for supporters like art historian Kyra Belán, she is a "symbol for female achievement" in different art forms. She was referred to as a contemporary gesamtkunstwerk and the art-pop queen, while American performing artist David Blaine said that perhaps she "is herself her own greatest work of art". Her influence has been noted in a number of contemporary artists, including Silvia Prada, Trisha Baga and Pegasus. Various artists have depicted Madonna either once or multiple times, including Peter Howson, Andrew Logan, Sebastian Krüger and Al Hirschfeld. Madonna's likeness and some of her own works have also been displayed in museums and art galleries exhibitions around the world, including the video of "Bedtime Story", which became part of Museum of Modern Art's permanent collection.

== Background ==
=== Formative years ===
The story of Madonna's origins as an artist is as important as the music itself in understanding the impact she's had on bringing the underground into the mainstream.

— Malina Bickford of Vice (2014).

Madonna's background with the arts and its influence on her future career have been well-documented. In a conversation with curator Vince Aletti in 1999, she said her interest in art started when she was a child. She visited the Detroit Institute of Arts, where she learned about Frida Kahlo and started reading about her. Madonna also mentioned her Catholic education, saying "there's art everywhere" in the churches, "so you get introduced to it that way".

From early on, Madonna's father encouraged his children to take classes related to art disciplines. He wanted Madonna to take piano lessons, and while music was one of her motivations and goals, the piano was not for her. She had a friend who was taking ballet lessons, and she convinced her father to let her take ballet instead of piano. For Madonna, dance was a gateway for discovery of other arts in which she has maintained a lifelong interest, according to biographer Carol Gnojewski. In performing arts school, she studied dance, music theory and art history. She also took a Shakespearean course.

At Rochester School of Ballet, she met instructor Christopher Flynn, who took a special interest in helping her succeed. Flynn was impressed by her talent and ambition and took it upon himself to become her mentor, exposing her to Detroit's museums, operas, concerts, art galleries, and fashion shows. Her tastes broadened to include classical music, Pre-Raphaelite painters, and poets.

=== 1970s and arrival to New York City ===
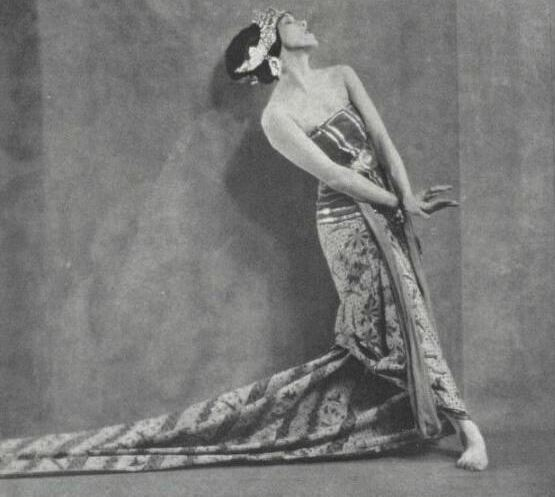
Madonna would eventually practice modern dance with Martha Graham (pictured in 1922) and Pearl Lang in New York City.

Madonna pursued a career in modern dance, moving to New York City in the late 1970s. She attended numerous museums for free, and worked as an nude art model at art schools and for photographers such as Martin Schreiber and Lee Friedlander. This brought her into contact with painters and photographers. Madonna would later declare: "People painted me all the time". She briefly took classes on photography, painting and drawing.

While pursuing her dance career, Madonna participated in the 1978 American Dance Festival at Duke University in Durham. Richard Maschal, who interviewed her for The Charlotte Observer that year, described the then-dance student as "what the American Dance Festival is about". During the festival she also met Pearl Lang, who later became her dance mentor and helped her to get a job at the Russian Tea Room. A year later, she successfully auditioned to perform in Paris with French disco artist Patrick Hernandez as his backup singer and dancer. She was selected by Fernandez, who was impressed by her stage presence, from an audition attended by 1,500 people. Hernandez and his team took interest in grooming her as a star; her Parisian patrons intended to develop and market Madonna as a disco singer, paying her expenses, including further classes for singing, dancing and conversational French lessons. Hernandez claims that his fame motivated Madonna, as he and his friends "succeeded" in convincing her that she could become a major recording star. She grew deeply dissatisfied with the pace of her career as dictated by her managers, and she did not prefer disco music. Then she returned to New York City.

=== Personal relationships ===
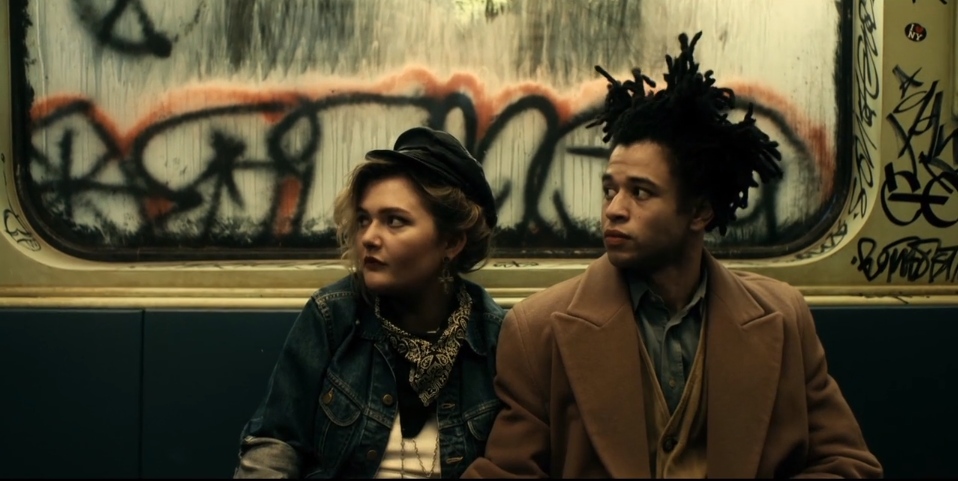
A scene from Madonna & Basquiat, an episode of Sky Arts' Urban Myths based on their relationship

Outlet Contemporary Art explained that Madonna made her first connection with the local art scene of New York in clubs located on the Lower East Side and SoHo, including Danceteria, The Limelight, The Roxy, Funhouse, Mudd Club and the Paradise Garage, frequented by School of Visual Arts artists and others public figures. She befriended various painters, graffiti and visual artists such as Keith Haring, Futura 2000, Fab Five Freddy and Daze. In 1978, she met graffiti artist Norris Burroughs, with whom she had a brief relationship.

Artist Martin Burgoyne was her roommate on the Lower East Side and became her best friend. In an interview with Austin Scaggs, she said a roommate introduced her to Haring, but she was already aware of his art. Her then boyfriend Jean-Michel Basquiat introduced Madonna to Andy Warhol, Glenn O'Brien, and Larry Gagosian. Gagosian recalled that Basquiat said, "She'll be the biggest pop star in the world". O'Brien later edited Madonna's 1992 book Sex and worked with her on the book documenting her The Girlie Show tour, published in 1994. Madonna met Darlene Lutz, who became her personal art advisor from 1983 to 2004, through O'Brien.

In an interview with American artist David Blaine in 2014, Madonna talked about the close relationship she had with Burgoyne, Haring and Basquiat, as they hung out together with Warhol joining them sometimes. She wrote an article for The Guardian in 1996 discussing her relationship with Basquiat, and wrote about her friendship with Haring in Keith Haring: The Authorized Biography (1992) by art critic John Gruen. Madonna further immortalized their friendship in the song "Graffiti Heart" from her 2015 album, Rebel Heart. She is also mentioned in Warhol's diary The Andy Warhol Diaries. In 2019, Sky Arts' Urban Myths dedicated an episode entitled Madonna & Basquiat to their relationship.

During the time spent with her graffiti artist friends in New York, Madonna used the graffiti tag "Boy Toy", making her own graffiti on walks, subways or sidewalks. The moniker referred to one of her boyfriends, RP3, a subway scratchitti artist who also used the tag and gave it to her. She later used it as the name of her copyright company, as well as on the belt buckle of a dress worn during her Like a Virgin era.

== Implementation and influence in her work ==
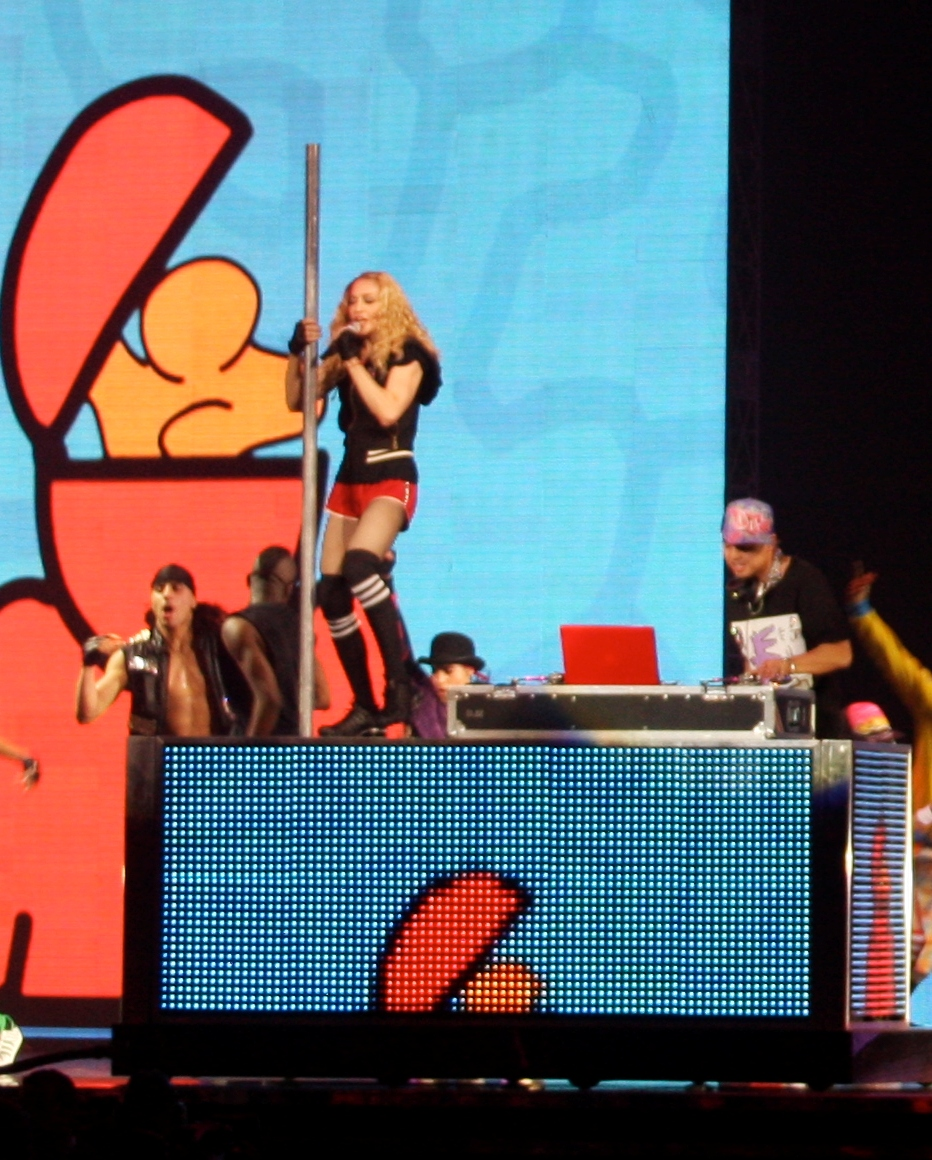
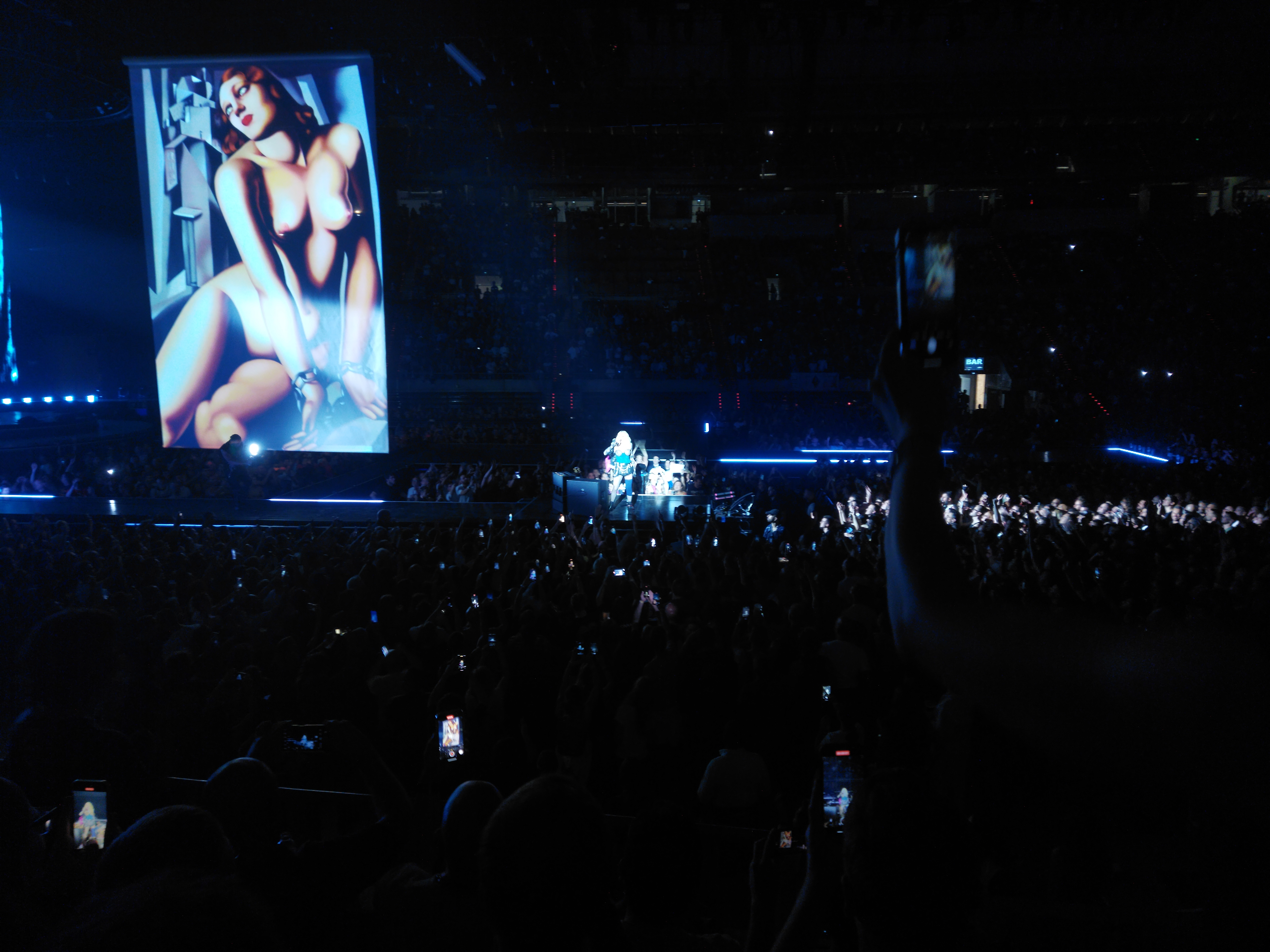
Childlike animations in the style of Keith Haring during the Sticky & Sweet Tour in 2008 and Tamara de Lempicka's Andromeda (c. 1927-1928) depicted at The Celebration Tour (2023)

Madonna's early visuals and presentation were often described as pop art. In the 1990s, critic Martha Bayles said she cultivated a "heavy-duty pop art image". Editor Paul Flynn called her "a pop artist in the Warholian sense of the word", while in 1997 John R. May described her a "successful piece of pop art" and as "a splendor formae of aesthetic". In Pastiche: Cultural Memory in Art, Film, Literature (2001), Ingeborg Hoesterey asserts: "Madonna came from the beginning very much from the plastic arts. When she splashed onto the music scene, she did so by quoting the kitsch of devotional Virgin artifacts that (Mexican) figurative painters critiqued in the seventies".

Madonna was considered both a visual musical artist and performer rather than a musician, with Canadian scholar Karlene Faith commenting in the late 1990s about "her abundant talent as a visual artist". Thomas Harrison, of the University of Central Florida, recognized various female artists before Madonna but expressed that she "took it to a whole other level" by always embracing the visual aspects of performance. Tony Clayton-Lea of The Irish Times even regarded Madonna as "the first female pop star to fully engage with the visual elements of her art".

Her "knowledge" was commented on by various during the height of her career. In 2000, American Photo's editor-in-chief David Schonauer commented that she is perhaps "one of the most visually savvy humans on earth". From John A. Walker to Vince Aletti, critics regarded her as "knowledgeable" in references and photography. In his Madonna biography, Andrew Morton commented that her "stunning visual sense" is no accident, as she "spent a lifetime" studying photographs, black-and-white movies and paintings. In 1994, Richard R. Burt cites a reporter who saw her as an "astute if untrained art critic". Los Angeles Times critic Patrick Goldstein once commented about her attendance at "Degenerate Art" (1991) held in Los Angeles County Museum of Art, "she's savvy enough" but her "interests are largely visual". Madonna herself declared that her primarily interests in art are "suffering, and irony and a certain bizarre sense of humour".

=== Influences for Madonna ===
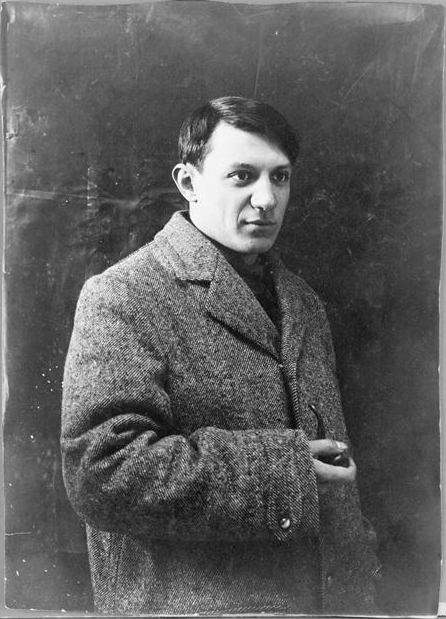
Pablo Picasso, one of the painters who influenced Madonna

Madonna is reported to be often inspired by the visual artists she collects. She once stated: "Every video I've done has been inspired by some painting or work of art". Decades noted art as being part of her personal life and professional career. In 2020, she said: "Art has kept me alive".

A number of observers have commented about specific artists. Scholar Kocku von Stuckrad recalls how Frida Kahlo became her role model. Some other scholars, including Pamela Robertson from the University of Notre Dame, and Georges-Claude Guilbert describes she captured the "full force of Warhol" and described him as the "virtual father of Madonna", respectively. Scholars Sandra M. Gilbert and Susan Gubar agree that "the work of Cindy Sherman prefigured Madonna's style in the art world". In Understand Postmodernism: Teach Yourself (2010), Glenn Ward said work of the pair can be "compared". A portrait of Lee Miller kissing another woman by Man Ray that she owns, inspired her and encouraged the use of lesbian imagery.

Walker commented that Picasso was a precedent for Madonna's reinventions, as he was an artist who changed his style a number of times. Madonna herself stated in 2015: "I like to compare myself to other kinds of artists, like Picasso". She also commented that believes there is not a time or expiration date for being creative. Like Picasso, she adds, "he kept painting and painting until the day he died".

=== Collaborations with artists ===
Since her debut, she has worked with various visual artists. For instance, her friend Martin Burgoyne designed the cover art of "Burning Up" (1983), which featured a grid of twenty postage stamp-sized portraits of Madonna in every color of the rainbow, while graffiti artist Michael Stewart appeared as a dancer in her debut music video "Everybody". Her brother Christopher Ciccone also collaborated with her in her early career, including as the art director of her 1990's tours.

Street artist Mr. Brainwash entered the music scene when Madonna commissioned him to design the cover art of Celebration, its video compilation, and a special edition vinyl. In 2017, Madonna invited Brazilian street artist Eduardo Kobra to paint two murals at the Mercy James Institute for Pediatric Surgery and Intensive Care. Brazilian visual artist Aldo Diaz was hired by Madonna for work on different projects, starting with the single "Bitch I'm Madonna" in 2015 and continuing through her official calendar of 2018. She also forged collaborative friendship with fine-art, portrait and fashion photographers.

== Footprints in the art scene ==
Within the art world, Madonna is almost as well known for being a collector as she is for her music.

— Lani Seelinger from The Culture Trip (2016).

Madonna has made several appearances on the art scene. In this regard, Kriston Capps from New York magazine said that she "has arguably been edging around the corners of contemporary art her entire career". In 2016, Rain Embuscado from Artnet commented that she "has always had a hand in the art world".

British art historian, John A. Walker documented her life and career from the perspective of the arts in the early 2000s. In 1990, the arts-based BBC1 series Omnibus broadcast a profile on Madonna, which was watched by 7.7 million people; slightly higher than the average audience of 3.1 million.

=== Activities and contributions ===
In 2001, she presented the Turner Prize at Tate Britain in London, receiving positive comments from BBC's art correspondent, Rosie Millard. It was called as "a rare marriage of pop and art" by The Independent. British linguistic Roy Harris called her appearance a merger between art and showbiz. In 2014, she presented The Wall Street Journal's Innovation Award at MoMA to her former dancer, Charles Riley for his contributions to the performing arts. In 2017, she was the special guest with visual artist Marilyn Minter at A Year of Yes: Reimagining Feminism at the Brooklyn Museum in its special segment Brooklyn Talks: Madonna x Marilyn where both addressed topics of art and culture. The event was moderated by Anne Pasternak, Elizabeth Alexander, Shelby White and Leon Levy.

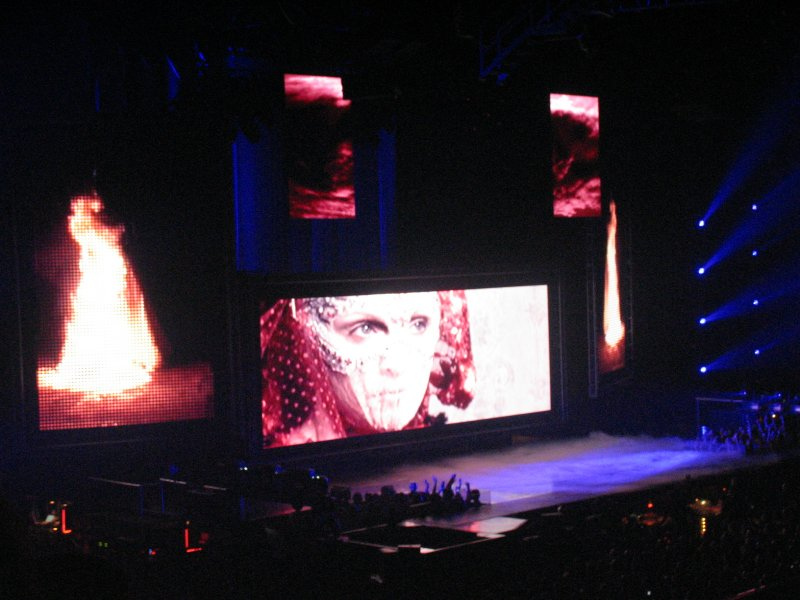
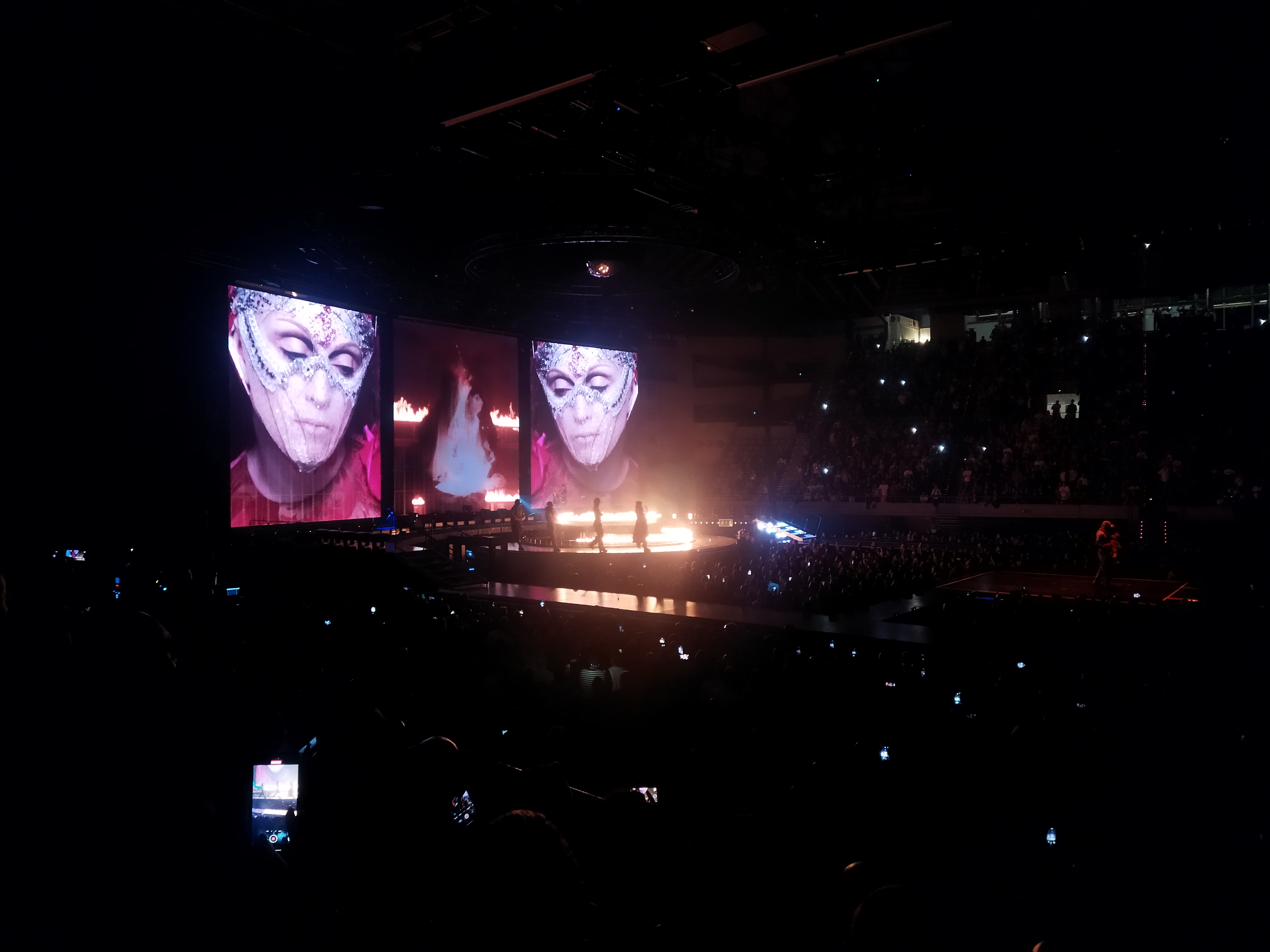
During the Re-Invention World Tour, Madonna used images of her installation X-STaTIC Pro=CeSS in its backdrop videos (left), and once again during her 2023-2024 Celebration Tour (right).

Alex Greenberger from Artspace said Madonna has also made art. In 2003, she collaborated with Steven Klein on the art installation X-STaTIC Pro=CeSS which was on display at international art galleries such as Deitch Projects, Gagosian Gallery and Camera Work in Berlin. The multimedia exhibit was touted as "Madonna's art world debut". According to art critic Walter Robinson, the project was "too cheesy to be art" but "philosophically speaking, no slight accomplishment in art world that privileges everything". In Madonna: Like an Icon (2007), Lucy O'Brien described it as one of her most fascinating projects, and also considered it marked her transition into a new phase through her use of visuals.

In 2013, Madonna co-initiated "Art for Freedom" with Vice magazine, as an effort to support independent creators of art content around the world and to promote and facilitate artistic and free expression. She made a performante at Gagosian Gallery in New York, to mark the launch of the initiative, showing her bound, handcuffed, and dragged on stage by performers in police uniforms.

In 2022, along with digital artist Mike Winkelmann ("Beeple"), Madonna created a NFT project called "Mother of Creation" consisting of three videos, namely "Mother of Nature", "Mother of Evolution" and "Mother of Technology". Each of the digital artworks is accompanied by music and a voiceover by Madonna, who reads poetry by poet Jalaluddin Rumi and reportedly spent one year creating the project. Launched in the NTF platform SuperRare, the project became a subject of scrutiny, with Gareth Harris from The Art Newspaper saying: "There have been stranger collaborations in the art world, but not many have been as headline-hitting" of the pair partnership, while art magazine Apollo said it further "raise a flicker of interest" in the NFT.

=== Art exhibitions ===
Madonna "has quietly sponsored many [art] exhibitions over the years", wrote Máire Ní Fhlathúin in The Legacy of Colonialism (1998), while her then art adviser, said she "doesn't want or need the press for everything she does".

In 1992, Madonna sponsored the first Jean-Michel Basquiat museum retrospective at the Whitney Museum of American Art. In 1995, she sponsored the first major retrospective of Tina Modotti at the Philadelphia Museum of Art on which curator and art historian Anne d'Harnoncourt commented: "She seemed a natural sponsor for an exhibition that introduces the artist to a broader public". In 1996, Madonna sponsored an exhibition of Basquiat's paintings at the Serpentine Gallery in London. Madonna was the only sponsor for the Cindy Sherman's first retrospective Untitled Film Stills at the Museum of Modern Art (MoMA) in 1997.

She has visited numerous museums, including various attendances at MoMA launch parties, and at Tate galleries while she lived in the United Kingdom. For the latter museum, she lent Kahlo's Self-Portrait with Monkey at Tate Modern, which was the first British exhibition dedicated to Frida Kahlo. The decision to loan the painting only came after several weeks of negotiation, which was partly delayed due the September 11 attacks. Commenting on the loan, Madonna felt "the exhibit would not be complete without" that painting.

=== Art collecting ===
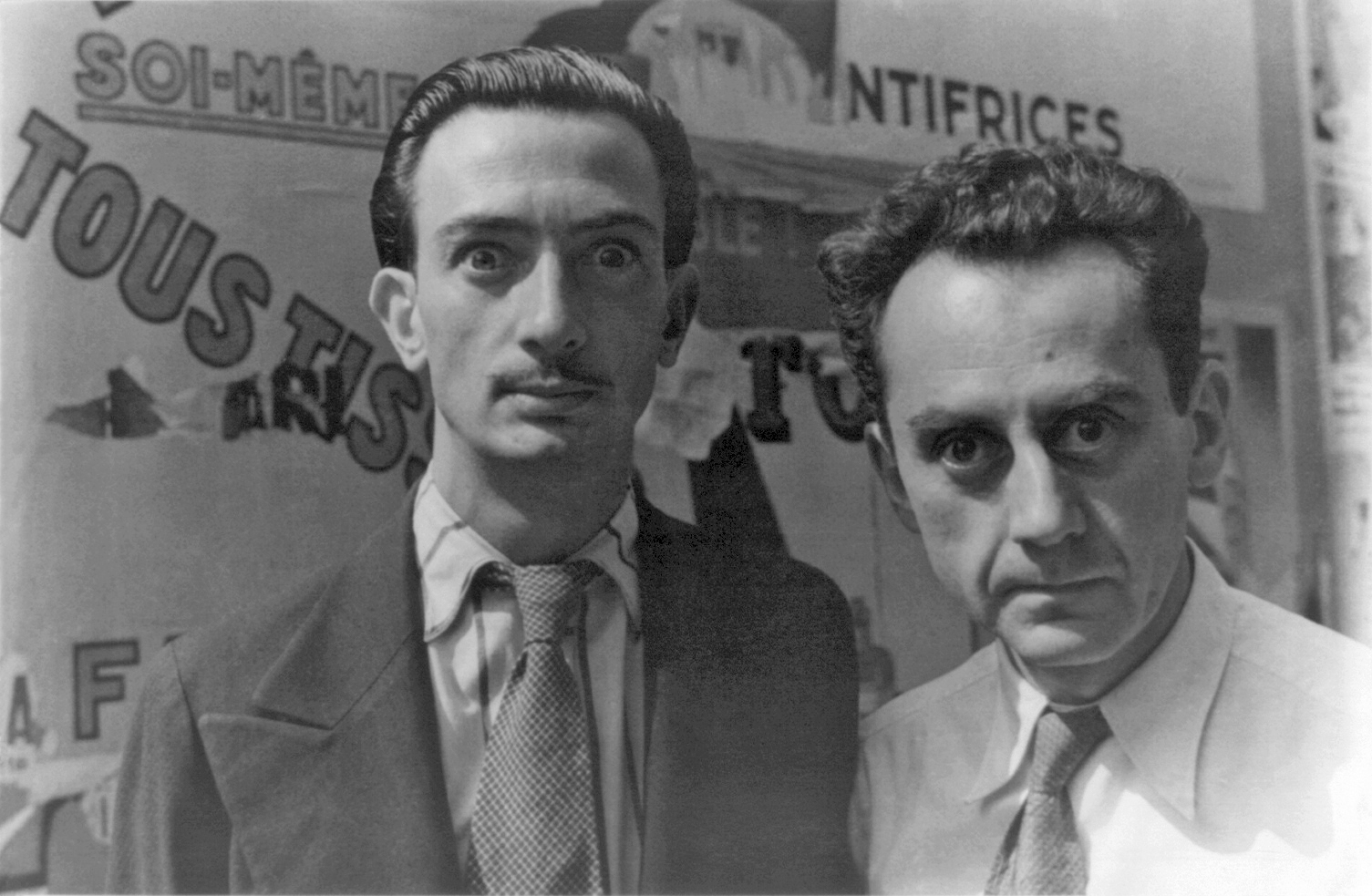
Madonna's art collection include works of artists such as Salvador Dalí (left) and Man Ray (right).

Madonna is an art collector, with a collection worth between $100 million and $160 million. Artnet deemed her possessions a blue-chip collection. She started collecting after receiving her first paycheck in the early 1980s and hired Darlene Lutz as her personal art dealer, who worked with her from 1983 to 2004. Both Darlene and Madonna's brother Christopher Ciccone, bid at auctions on her behalf, with a budget no larger than $5 million. Called a "distinguished art collector" by a spokesman of Tate Gallery in 2001, she appeared among the 100 Biggest Collectors by Art & Antiques, circa 1996, and The Hollywood Reporter's Top 25 Art Collectors in 2013.

Her collection is based primarily on modernists, and include over 300 pieces of artists such as Salvador Dalí, Pablo Picasso, Fernand Léger and Frida Kahlo. She also acquired works by Old Masters, including Italian painter Master of 1310. Austin Scaggs asked Madonna if she has paintings of her friends Warhol and Haring and her former boyfriend Basquiat; "Have a few of each", she replied. During an interview with Howard Stern in 2015, she explained why she didn't have various of the paintings Basquiat had given her during their relationship. In 2021, she posted a series of photos of herself at home with a Basquiat drawing of her portrait. Madonna also collects artistic portrait pictures. In the 1990s, she paid $165,000 for Modotti's Roses then the highest price ever commanded by a print at auction.

=== Art supporter ===
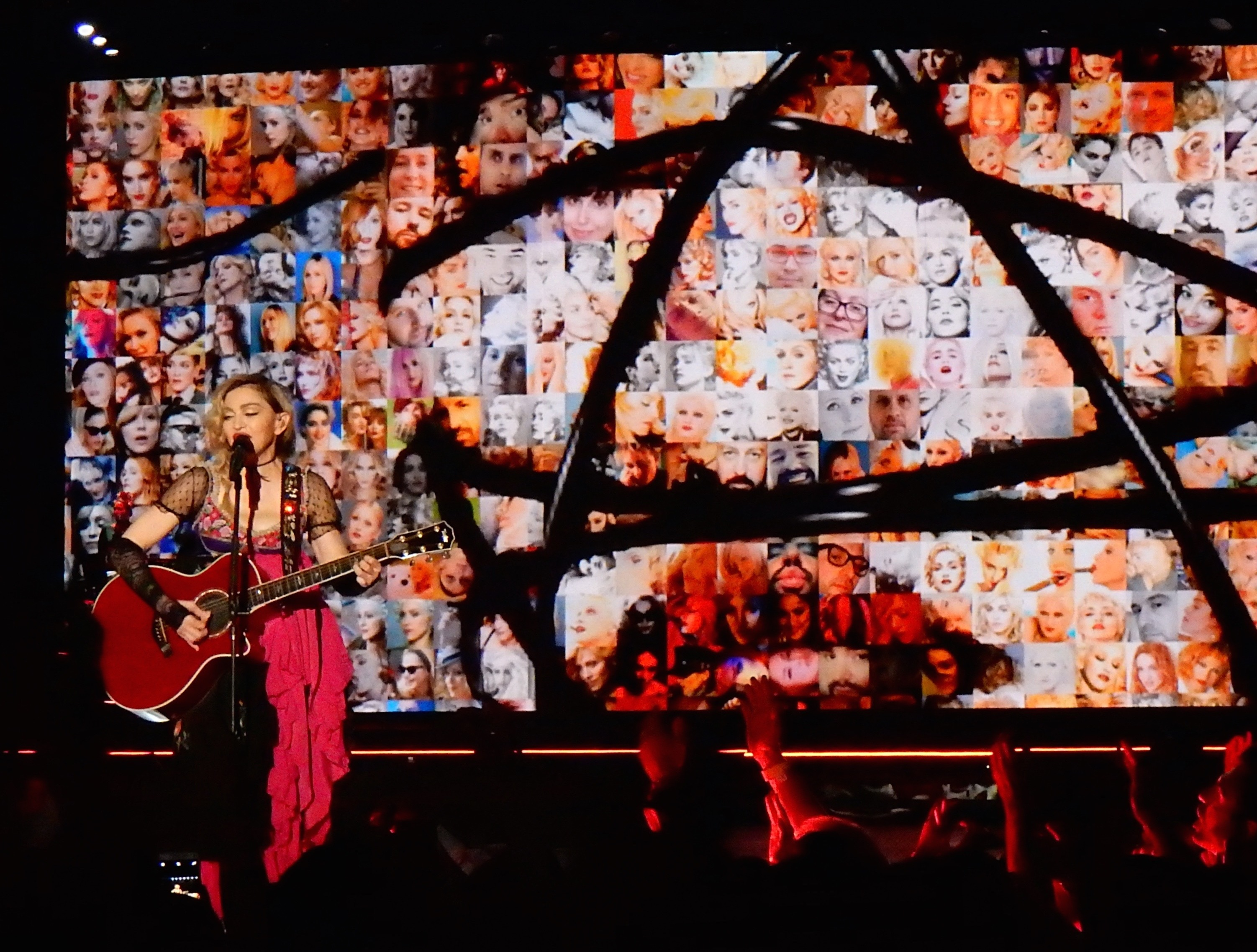
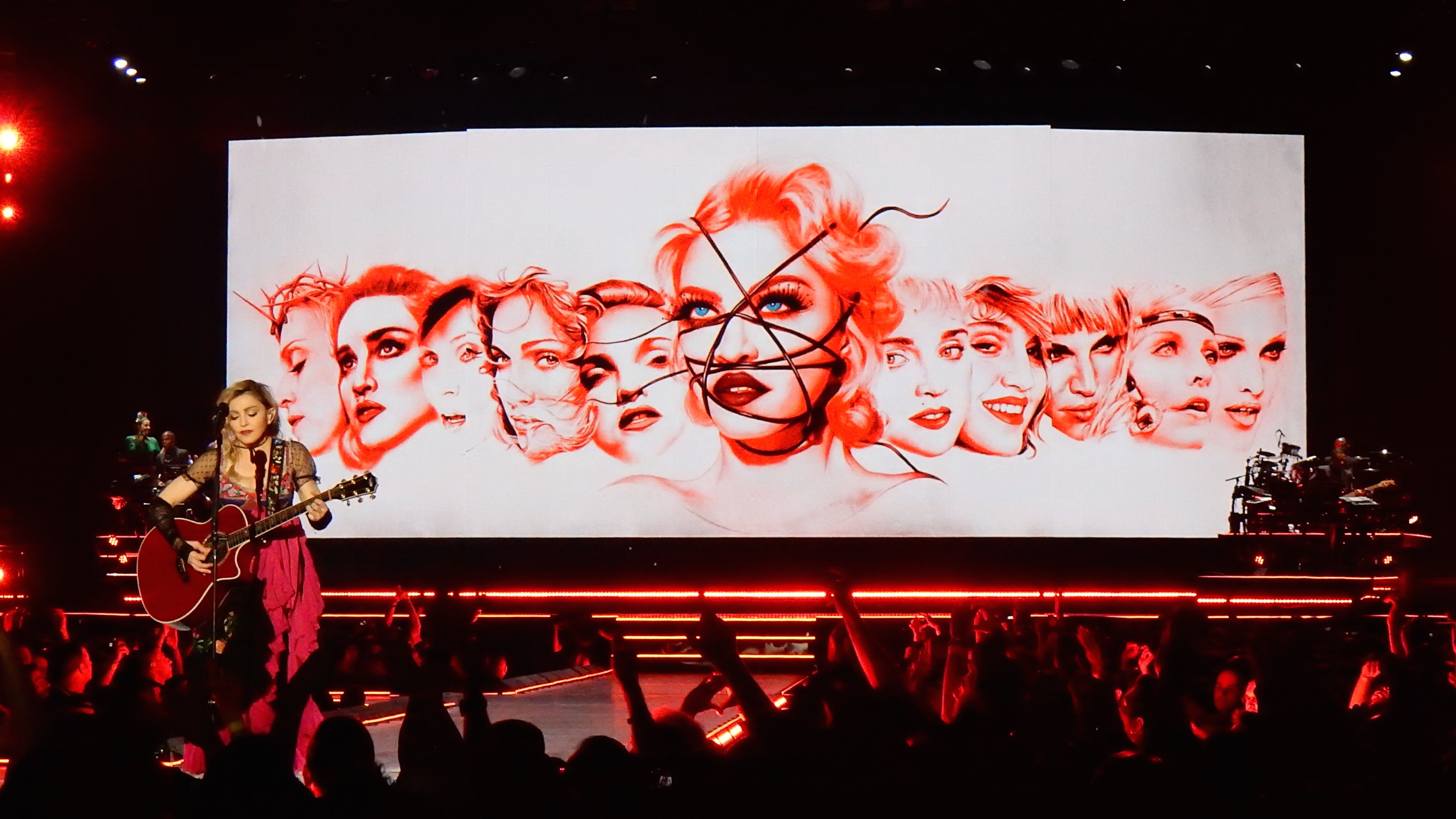
Madonna showing fan art in the backdrop videos of her Rebel Heart Tour

The works Untitled (1985) by American painter Julia Wachtel and The Six Second Epic (1986) by Kenji Fujita were bought by the Brooklyn Museum with funds from Madonna "Ciccone Penn". In the early 2000s, she was both regarded as an "art-lover" and supporter of modern art. In the early 1990s, anthropologist Néstor García Canclini recognized her support for feminist art. According to Tate Gallery, she has a long-standing interest in contemporary British art. Madonna later supported or benefited a number of unknown artists, by exposing their works on social media or purchasing their works. Some examples were reported by media. In 2024, according to media reports, she will fund a youth art project in Pompeii, Italy, named "Sogno di Volare" (in English: "Dream of Flying") for 2025.

During the Rebel Heart era, she invited her fandom through an online contest to create fan art to display in backdrop videos for her Rebel Heart Tour. Some of the artworks became part of an art exhibition in Italy at the Palazzo Saluzzo di Paesana titled Iconic – Portraits & Artwork inspired by The Queen with 50 pieces from 20 international artists and chosen by Madonna. In Life with My Sister Madonna, her brother also recognized how she encouraged him, while also lent him $200,000 to buy a studio where he began to paint regularly. Before his identity was revealed, she showed support to "Rhed" (Rocco Ciccone), her son with British filmmaker Guy Ritchie. Once his identity was revealed, in 2022, art critic Jonathan Jones made the suggestion "that the artist had been put into the public eye too soon".

=== Art for charity ===
She has used art for charity. A canvas painting by Madonna went to a charity auction in 1991, and was bought by actor Jason Hervey. She hosted a family art sale with two of her children to raise money for victims of the 2020 Beirut explosion. In 2022, Madonna and Anthony Vaccarello curated and organized Sex by Madonna at Art Basel from November 29 to December 4, a free-pass pop-up exhibition honoring the 30 years of her first book Sex. A re-edition of 800 copies was released with the proceeds going to her charitable organization Raising Malawi. When her project "Art for Freedom" was operating, she donated $10,000 each month to a nonprofit organization of a featured artist's choice. Her NFT project with "Beeple" generated primary auction sales volume of $612,000, destined to three charities picked by the pair.

In 2013, Madonna sold Three Women at the Red Table (1921) by Fernand Léger which she bought in 1990 for $3.4 million, raising $7.2 million. This was in support of female education through her Ray of Light Foundation. The action was reportedly a combination of her passions for art and education, with Madonna declaring: "I want to trade something valuable for something invaluable – Educating Girls!". In 2016, during her Madonna: Tears of a Clown at Art Basel, Miami she held an art auction to benefit Raising Malawi and art and education initiatives. She auctioned pieces of artists such as Damien Hirst and Tracey Emin. Combined with other personal belongings, she raised more than $7.5 million.

=== Controversies ===
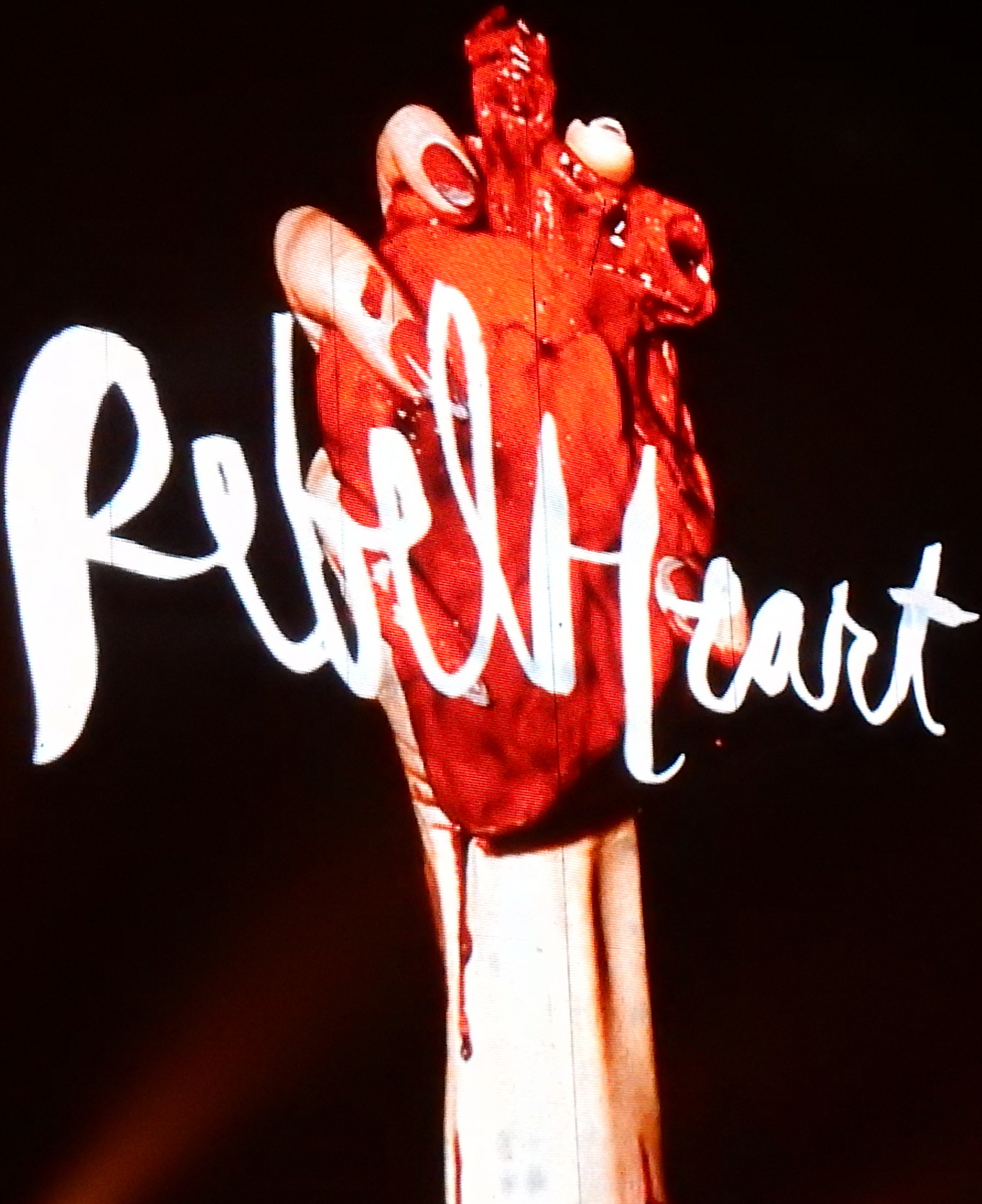
In the late-1980s, she said: "Art should be controversial, and that's all there is to it".

Madonna has been reported to use shock art/value, and supports artists whom push the "barriers of social norms". Around 2012, during her stance on the arrest of Pussy Riot in Russia, she stated "art should be political", and in her understanding, "art, historically speaking, always reflects what's going on socially". The title of her album Rebel Heart (2015) explores her belief that contemporary music artists are not encouraged or inspired to be "rebellious": take risks or speak-up.

Madonna created controversy when she presented the Turner Prize in 2001 to Martin Creed and told the audience: "Right on, motherfuckers— everyone is a winner!". In Is Art History Global? (2013), art historian James Elkins quotes Glyn Davis by saying on the event: "It would, of course, be inappropriate to see this as a radical intervention in art historical discourse. However, the clash of Nicholas Serota and pop icon Madonna produces its own pleasurable frisson; seeing a woman talk about art on television remains a rare sight, and it always to be welcome". British art historian Julian Stallabrass was convinced that the intention without doubt of having Madonna announce the Tate's Turner Prize, was to raise the profile of the event further. However, Stallabrass stated that the effect and the art displayed took on the role of more or less interesting diversions to the main spectacle of the "singer's publicity-hungry misbehaviour". Madonna's NFT videos produced along with "Beeple", received criticism from art critics like Ben Davis for her fully nude digitalized 3D character, while giving birth to butterflies, trees, and insects such as robotic centipedes through an actual scan of her genitals. She defended the project by saying: "I'm doing what women have been doing since the beginning of time, which is giving birth. But on a more existential level, I'm giving birth to art & creativity & we would be lost without both".

After allegedly refusing to loan a painting by Frida Kahlo to the Detroit Institute of Arts, she garnered some criticism. However, cultural critic Vince Carducci in one conclusion said that "my suspicion is that the request never bubbled up to her". Art journalist Lindsay Pollock openly questioned her after Andreas Gursky's work originally given to her as a gift was subsequently sold at Sotheby's. In January 2023, Brigitte Fouré, major of French city Amiens asked her to lend Jérôme-Martin Langlois's lost painting Diana and Endymion to the city, as it may be in her private collection. Thinking of Madonna as the possible owner, Fouré believes the singer obtained the artwork without permission, by saying "Clearly, we don't contest in any way that you have acquired this work legally".

== Performing arts and artistic production ==
Madonna's performances are art, after all—art that incorporates a play of sometimes conflicting social and political ideas

— Paul Thom, dean of arts at Australian National University (2000).

The development of her body of work from a creative perspective and her footprints within different performing arts were commented on by different sociologists and commentators, including American poet Jane Miller and editor Mark Watts. Speaking about the critical interest she aroused, author Jason Hanley commented in 2015 that her performances made critics and scholars "stand up" and take note of her sound, style and message.

Rather than a musician, Madonna was considered a performer. In 2007, Paul Rutherford, professor at the University of Toronto considered her a visual performer with "extraordinary stage presence". In 2022, Italian scholars from University of Macerata, concurred saying she has constructed an innovative "poetics of performances". The same year, Samuel R. Murrian from Parade considered her the "modern master of performance art". In 2018, Kyra Belán, an art historian and professor from Broward College, stated she achieved major success as an artist within several art forms, further labeling her as a female achievement. In Women in Russian Theatre (2013), however, Catherine Schule explained that various "avant-garde critics regard her performances as trendy schlock rather than legitimate art".

=== Stage shows ===
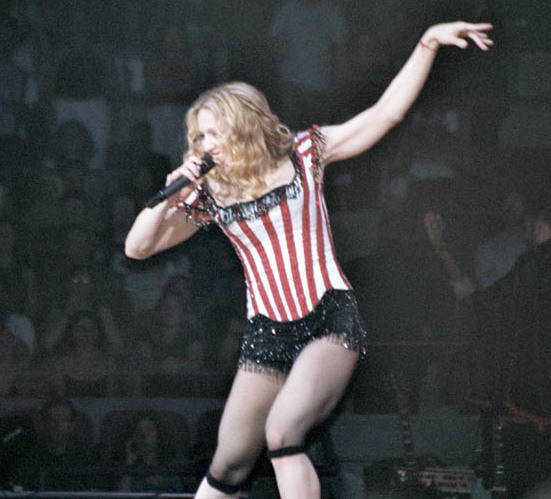
During best part of her career, Madonna's stage performances have been considered tableaux vivants and theatrical shows.

During Madonna's imperial phase, she attracted significant praise for her stage shows; they were regarded as "organized sequences of events, scripts, known texts and movements". According to author Michael Heatley in 2008, she "always set high standards with her stage shows". Described as tableaux vivants, senior lecturer Ian Inglis said in 2013 that her live performances have been celebrated as "theatrical events", while others deem them "immaculate performances". Writing for Slant Magazine in 2015, Sal Cinquemani considered her "the greatest performer of our time", saying she is a "showgirl" with theatrical shows of "narrative storytelling".

Madonna has been credited with helping propel artistic concepts for stage shows and tours in her generation, mainly for mainstream pop music shows. Some pointed out, how she divided into "thematic categories" her concerts in unusual forms. In William Baker's words, the splitting of sections derived that pretty much everyone copies or everyone is inspired by, and further mentioned "the modern pop concert experience was created by Madonna really". Lester Brathwaite from Logo TV, said she "transformed the concept of a rock concert from a mere live show into true performance art". Scholars and journalists, including Berrin Yanıkkaya and Matt Cain, detailed how she "paved the way" of extravaganza in concerts as a theatrical spectacle and having the female figure at center stage. If a specific title is mentioned, it is generally the Blond Ambition World Tour, for which Jacob Bernstein of The New York Times recognized other contemporary musicians, but with Madonna, he says, she set the tone. Speaking about her perceived influence, in The Twisted Tale of Glam Rock (2010), Stuart Lenig wrote: "Over the decades, Madonna's carefully choreographed and performed shows became a gold standard of pop theatre, inspiring others to re-embrace the stage".

=== Videos ===
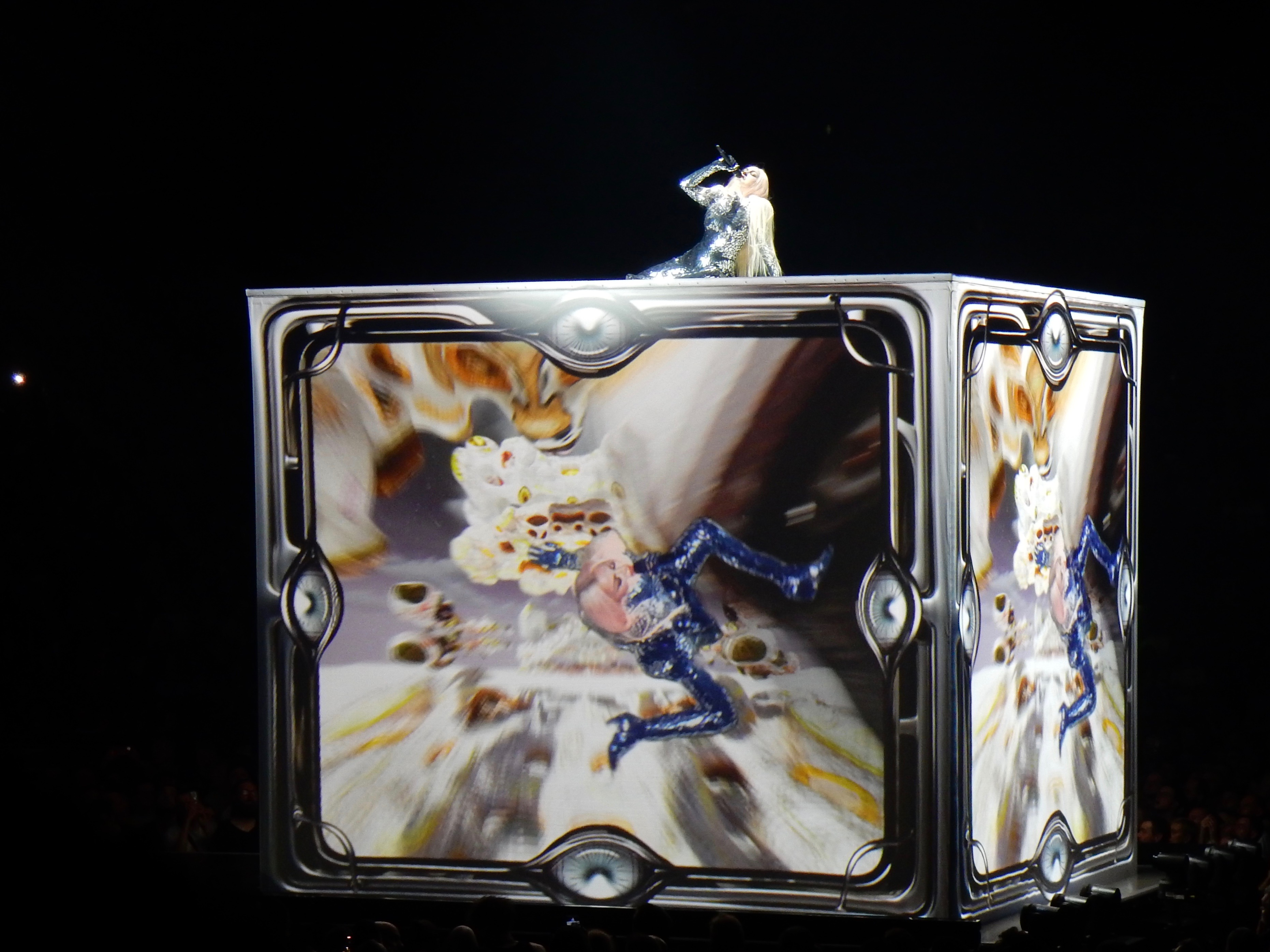
Madonna performing "Bedtime Story" on her 2023–24 The Celebration Tour. Briefly the most expensive music video in history, it shows references of numerous surrealists.

Madonna's videos have received considerable critical attention since the MTV generation of the 1980s. Reviews of her music videos have played a major role in her academic scrutiny, and a scholar has argued that she became "the most analyzed" figure among female music video stars. On the point, Martha Bayles said in the mid-1990s, "pundits, professors and preachers" tried to interpret Madonna "taking her far more seriously than others", further explaining that it was "more important one's relation to the visual arts instead one's musical statement".

Her videos were considered not merely commercial productions, but visual performances. On this, Rutherford, said her videos have been part of her visual presentation and artistic renditions. Rutherford noted how she put "considerable time" and money into crafting what were often "elaborate productions" (she owns some of the most expensive videos). Her influence in the videos as an art form, was commented on by critic Armond White in 2015, who said "she elevated this into a memorable expressive art form" and perceived her "art-consciousness" influence in artists such as Björk or Lady Gaga. He called Madonna's connection with that zeitgeist "historic". By diverse measurements, Madonna was credited as "the first female artist to exploit fully the potential of the music video". Scholar Norman Fairclough made the suggestion that "the evolution of the music video could indeed be studied through Madonna". White even credited Madonna for helping "popularize" the music video format. Her impact in the format was compared to that of Michael Jackson by Sarah Frink from Consequence, while she further credited her for set "the standard". Similar connotations were discussed by editors from VH1, and Slant Magazine. Retrospectively, she has been critically appreciated by mentions or rankings by music-targeted publications such as MTV, Billboard and Nerdist who have listed her among the most significant music video artists. Her contemporary reception is also attested by publications such as The Vindicator and Montreal Gazette in the early 1990s.

=== Dancing ===
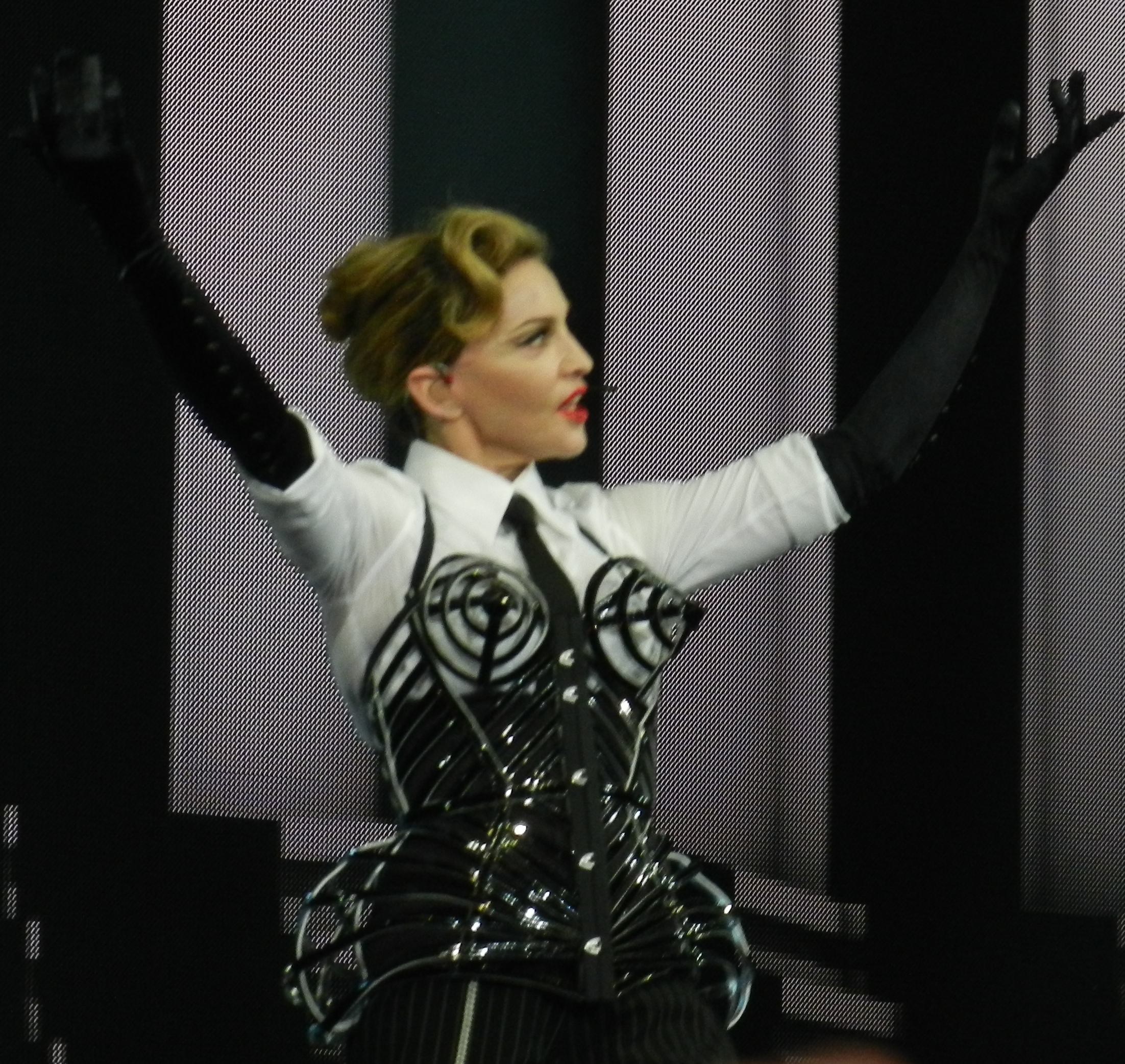
Madonna combined dance as a serious art form with clubbing. She is credited with popularizing various dance styles, including voguing and krumping.

Her role as a dancer also defined best part of her career; according to professor Thomas Harrison of Jacksonville University in 2011, "others have considered that her role as a musician and producer is secondary to her role as a dancer". The same year, Rolling Stone staffers commented she is "entirely synonymous with dancing". Various scholars and dance critics have reviewed her in the artistic discipline; American sociologist Cindy Patton was one of the first in articulate the "cultural" and "proto-political" effects of dance culture with her. In 2015, a The Guardian dance critic, noted her forays within several dance forms from "serious art" to club trends.

However, as a dancer, Madonna met mixed responses. In Popular Music and the Politics of Hope (2019) authors observed that she is "routinely dismissed by scholars, critics, and fellow artists alike as someone who 'can't sing and can't dance'". In late twentieth century, critic Lucy Sante called her "a graceless dancer". Others, including Interview magazine staffers in 2011, referred to her as "the best dancer/performer since Michael Jackson".

Madonna's greatness has always hinged on how she channeled dance trends into pop songs [...] which provided a neat way to sneak underground club trends into the mainstream.

— Stephen Thomas Erlewine from Hard Candy's review.

Included among Rolling Stone's poll of the "10 Favorite Dancing Musicians" in 2011, she was credited by the magazine to help bringing many underground dancing or its elements into the mainstream culture. Similarly, John Leland wrote for Newsweek in 1992, how Madonna embraced "underground nightclub subcultures" throughout her career and "taking them mainstream". Publishing company, DK noted her influence in dance styles such as voguing and krumping saying she helped made them "globally popular". O'Brien noted her influence in rave culture in the 1990s, and Public Culture in gay ball dance form. The Smithsonian Institution said Madonna helped transform pop concerts into dance spectacles, further crediting her with popularizing the use of headset microphones to allow greater movement and used choreography. Though she was not the first artist to use the technology, due to her prominent usage, a model became known as "Madonna mic". The institution also deemed Madonna as the first performer to use her tours as reenactments of her music videos.

=== Acting ===
Madonna's acting career was also analyzed from film studies, with British cultural theorist Angela McRobbie, adding she was analyzed from perspectives of feminist film theory. Madonna was considered by journalists of publications like Portland Mercury and Vanity Fair as an "unusual case", while authors Lou Harry and Eric Furman concurred saying in 2005, that "there are few actors or actresses in the movies who have bombed in as many genres as Madonna has". Her industry reception, however, at best was "mixed" according to a The Daily Telegraph contributor. Los Angeles Times echoed criticisms and counter-criticisms, with editors of Encyclopedia of Women in Today's World (2011), noting how some have seen her films or acting as "notable". Publications and authors, including Australian writer Clint Morris and website Queerty have elaborated listicles of her best movies or acting roles, while others have included her among best acting performances by musicians in movies, including Far Out, Collider and Billboard. For commentators like Kellner and Fresán, Madonna was better received as an actress in her music videos.

Her films such as Madonna: Truth or Dare, and Desperately Seeking Susan, garnered cult status in some audiences. Madonna also collected various number-one songs from motion pictures, with Billboard's Fred Bronson saying in 1995, that only Bryan Adams, Phil Collins, Prince and Madonna belongs to the very small club of artists who have had four soundtrack singles hit the top.

=== Depictions and accolades ===
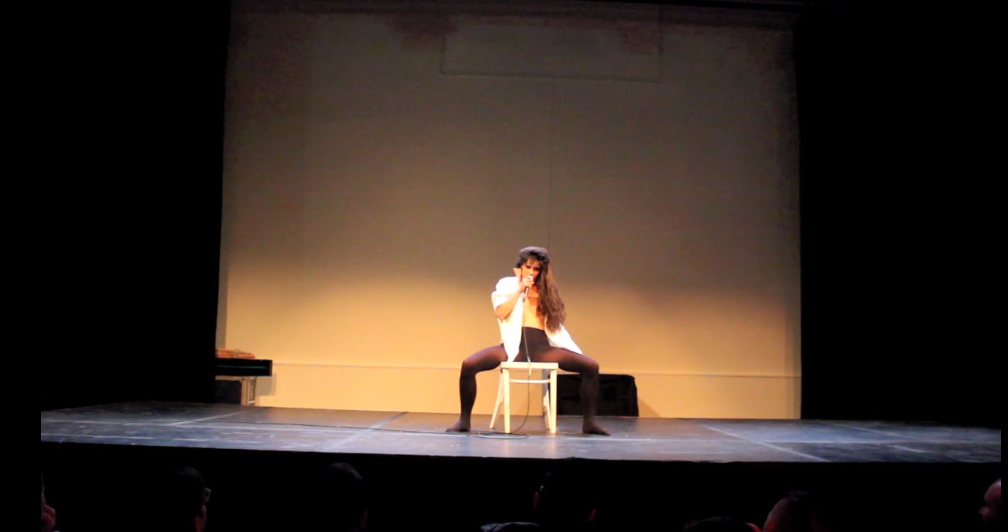
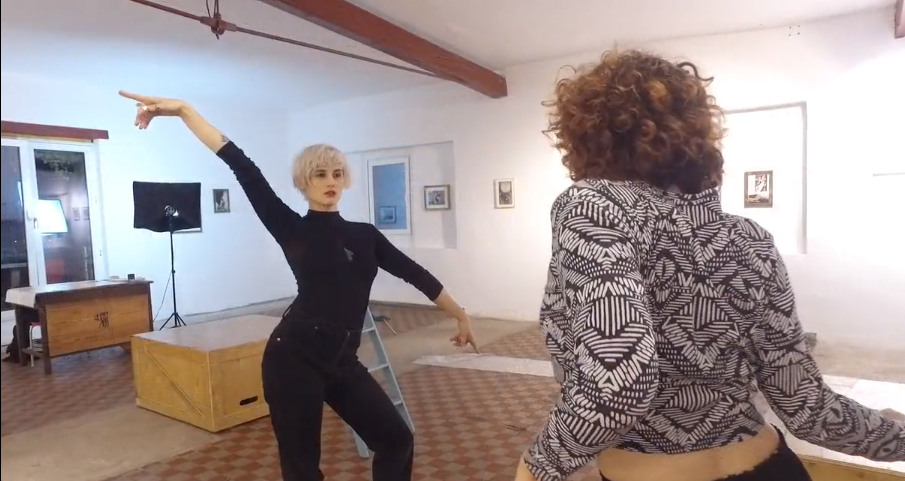
Madonna-inspired dance performances, Justify by Clara Furey (left) at Festival TransAmériques, and Madonna by two performing artists (right) in Germany

According to English writer Andrew Morton in 2001, various of her films have been exhibited in museums around the world as "modern works of art", including the Pompidou Center in Paris. In 2016, MoMA PS1 screened Madonna: Truth or Dare celebrating its 25th anniversary and impact. Her film career have been part of some tributes, including a comedic tribute in 2009 named Almost Human: Madonna on Film, hosted by David Schmader at Central Cinema, while Metrograph devoted the Body of Word: A Madonna Retrospective in 2016, a five-days retrospective celebrating her film career. A month-thematic Madonna film series was announced to be held at The Roxy Cinema in New York starting on July 27 and running through August 2023.

Some of her videos were part of art exhibitions, notoriously, "Bedtime Story" on display permanently at the Museum of Modern Art (MoMA) and then in Museum of the Moving Image of London. Other entities like the School of Visual Arts screened the video as well. The 2000 article Madonna and Hypertext, published by the National Art Education Association in their Studies in Art Education, explored two Madonna's videos.

She has inspired some dance visuals performances. For instance, Singaporean composer, painter and poet, Mark Chan displayed the "Dreaming of Kuanyin, Meeting Madonna" (2007) at the Singapore International Festival of Arts, a dance and visual poem that combined dance moves, inspired by Kuanyin, Virgin Mary and Madonna. In 2018, Madonna was awarded by the High School of Performing Arts in Malaga (in Spanish: Escuela Superior de Artes Escénicas de Málaga, ESAEM). They rendered a performance tribute called Madonna Revolution. In 2015, she received a tribute in the Canadian's L'International des Feux Loto-Québec.

== Artistic reception ==
=== Postmodernism ===
Postmodernism encompasses a variety of approaches and movements, including aesthetics. In the early 2000s, Arthur Asa Berger noted how it was popular in academic circles discussing her within postmodernism and further explains that a "simple way" of thinking about postmodernism is the way in which "our contemporary artists and culture produce art".

She has been estimated both immediately and retrospectively. Some, including author Shara Rambarran in 2021, labeled her both icon and "Queen of Postmodernism". In the 1990s, American philosopher Susan Bordo described her as a "postmodern heroine". In 2007, O'Brien held that "much has been made of Madonna as a postmodern icon", as well as that her reference points have been resolutely modernist. According to Glenn Ward, "Madonna has been important to postmodernism for her ability to plunder the conventions". Academics Sudhir Venkatesh and Fuat Firat described her as "representative of postmodern rebellion". She epitomizes posmodernism said Olivier Sécardin from Utrecht University. In similar remarks, Graham Cray once considered her as perhaps "the most visible example", while Martin Amis said she was "perhaps the most postmodern personage on the planet".

=== Criticisms and ambiguities ===
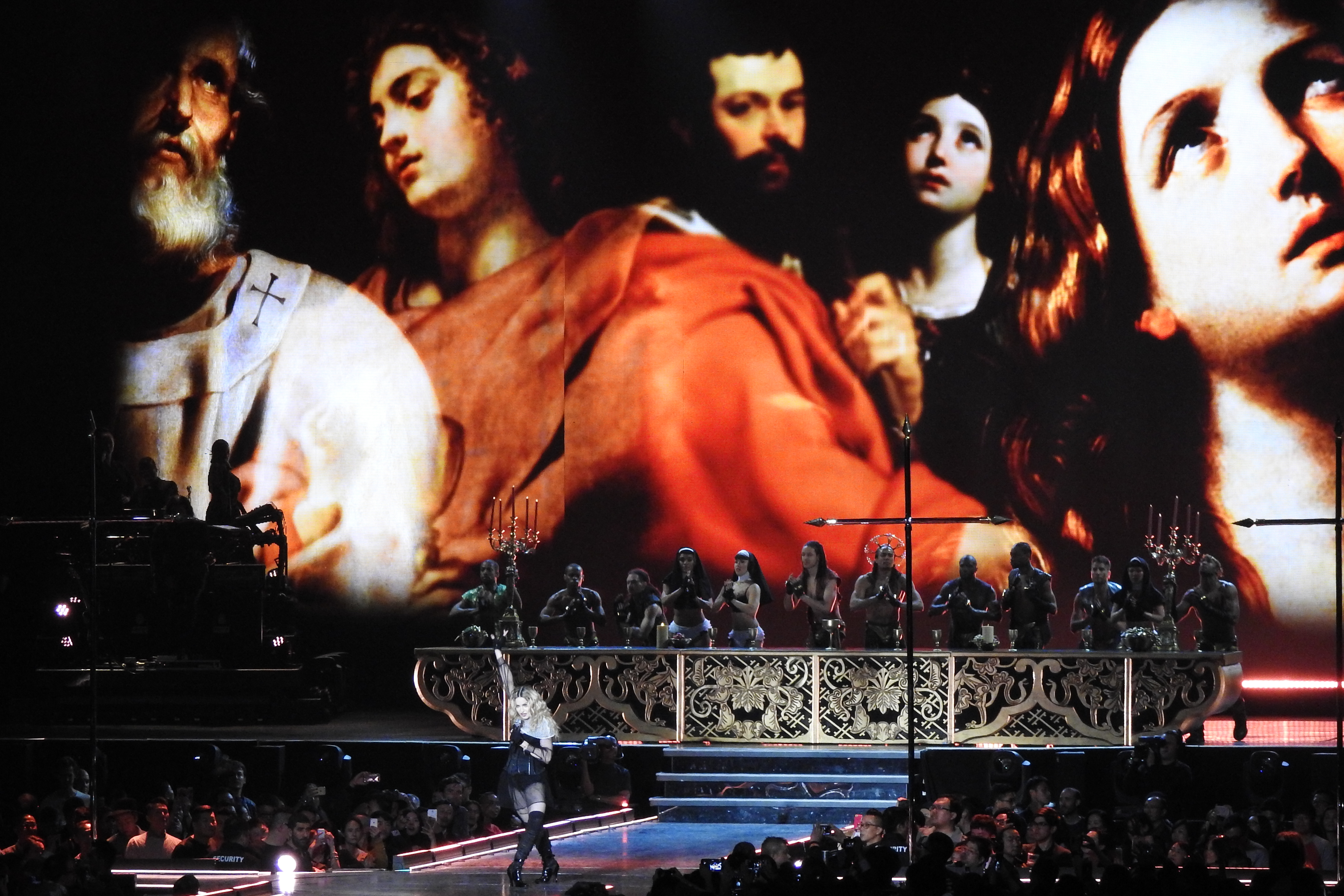
Madonna during her Rebel Heart Tour. She has been called an iconoclast, and has been criticized for her usage of religious art and imagery.

Late-twentieth-century perspectives on Madonna engaged some viewers, and some from art and academic communities by discussing low and high culture value in her figure and works. In the early 1990s, three academics conducted a survey by college students, where Madonna was seen as "all artifice and no art" and "as emblematic of the lowest form of aesthetic culture". They compared her art to being "suspicious, because unlike the works of Vincent van Gogh or Henri Matisse, it is readily available for purchase at any record or video store", implying that she did not belong to a high art tradition of selflessness.

Her enormous commercial success is often held against her [...] as evidence that she prostitutes her art (and, by extension, herself).

— Genders, University of Texas Press' journal (1988).

English art critic John Berger noted the criticisms, commenting her work's accessibility to a mass public may have contributed to a decrease in its perceived value. Scholar Douglas Kellner made the suggestion she should be interpreted in both terms, and her works by implication can be read either as works of art or analyzed as "commodities" that shrewdly exploit markets. In 2013, Kriston Capps from New York said Jeff Koons made conspicuous consumption a concern of fine art, but Madonna immortalized it with "Material Girl". Italian art critic Achille Bonito Oliva describes her song as a perfect for a time when art, money and politics were "electronically entwined". Citing three scholars' poll, Simon Frith stated "clearly, pushing Madonna to the bottom rungs of the pop cultural ladder makes a space at the top for pop music 'art'".

Her broadcast profile as an artiste in the arts-based BBC One series Omnibus in 1990, divided some from art community and public of the time, and according to Walker, "letters and articles subsequently appeared in the press both for and against" her. Michael Ignatieff claimed that her conception of art was false. He was quoted as saying, "I certainly don't mind that she is obscene [...] What I can't stand about Madonna is that she thinks she's an artist". Prior that, in 1988, professor of media arts John Ellis questioned the idea of having Madonna in Omnibus.

Madonna's sexuality has worked both for and against her. In Madonnaland (2016), Alina Simone denotes that "her art is highly sexualized because she is highly sexualized". Her first book, Sex was considered an art book; but outlet Contemporary Art pointed out that by "bringing together arty images" the book raised interesting questions about when art is acceptable. In using religious art, Madonna has been called an iconoclast, and has received criticism from the religious sector.

Through her career, as Dahlia Schweitzer explains in 2019, many critics have long resisted using the words "Madonna" and "artistic" in the same sentence. Back in 2013, Sandra Barneda from the website The Objective, observed that for many "she is far" from art. Michael Love wrote for Paper magazine in 2019, that both her music and visuals "have always been interpreted as 'good' or 'bad' based on what's relevant in the moment".

==== Other views ====
In On Fashion (1994) by scholars Shari Benstock and Suzanne Ferriss, it was concluded that she challenges and "puts in question and tests one's aesthetic categories and commitments", but she can be viewed as a modernist. In 1993, Walker suggested the debate she provoked after Omnibus's episode was a perhaps "sign of its cultural significant", and retrospectively recognizes her a decade later, for seemingly understands "art depends upon artifice, creation, invention, imagination and masquerade". According to book The Connection Madonna (1993), other scholars compared how "Madonna's failure" to conform to established rules and commentary have led to her dismissal as a "serious artist" and "fueled attacks" on her. In the 1990s, Robertson suggested "Madonna's art and its reception by critics and fans reflect and shape some of our culture's anxieties about identity and power inequalities". During this decade, American musicologist Susan McClary was quoted questioning some of the criticisms she faced, and provided arguments in her area to "refute" some of them, explaining that the framework in which Madonna operates is somewhat different from that of the Western art tradition, in which "feminine subjects must be destroyed", and further recognized her to "exercises control over her art". In 2023, author Mary Gabriel argued to "really understand" her career, you need to understand the New York club scene that fostered her talent, as a "community that was intent on breaking taboos and boundaries" while she continues with that "sensibility".

Writing for The New York Times in 1990, music critic Jon Pareles invited the audience to see her as a "continuous multi-media art project". Years later, in 2002, Black Belt editor Sara Fogan mentioned she "challenges herself as an artist", and by 2022, Italian academics from the University of Macerata considered her an artist of a "hypertrophic system of signs and symbols bound to the worlds of spectacle, art, music, cinema and fashion". Writing for The Observer in 2023, O'Brien referred to her as "one of the most vivid, confrontational and imaginative female artists in the music industry".

===== Recognition =====
In 1996, music critic J. D. Considine wrote that both Madonna and Michael Jackson redefined our notions of "artistic impact". Following Michael Jackson's death, a panel of Argentine art journalists and critics considered her at that time as "the only universal artist left standing" of an entire era. Those critics, including Daniel Molina, Graciela Speranza and Alicia de Arteaga explained that she is herself "a multimedia expression that condenses fashion, dance, photography, sculpture, music, video and painting". She was also complimented by some fellow musicians; Kanye West commented in 2014: "Madonna, I think, is the greatest visual musical artist that we've ever had". She is the "perfect example" of the visual artist once commented Fab Five Freddy. Shania Twain also praised her vision of aesthetics in 2023.

In the mid-2010s, Madonna classified herself as an artist and not a "pop act", while during the program of Council of Fashion Designers of America in 1992, she stated being a good artist "it's about taking chances" rather than being "powerful" or "rich". During this decade, she was also quoted as saying: "I am my own experiment. I am my own work of art". Writing for Interview in 2014, American illusionist David Blaine suggested that perhaps she "is herself her own greatest work of art—something so vastly influential as to be unfathomable". In 1997, May considered her a gesamtkunstwerk becoming a work of pop-art herself. In 2008, Scottish music blogger Alan McGee proposes that she is "post-modern art, the likes of which we will never see again".

== Impact ==
According to Stephanie Eckardt from W in 2018, her impact and influence in the arts have been "made almost entirely behind the scenes". In 2023, editor Jordan Robertson called it "a significant impact in the world of art". Italian art critic Francesco Bonami, called her the Picasso from music world. Ana Monroy Yglesias from the Grammy Awards website called her the Art-pop queen. In the early 1990s, Mark Bego commented she has "turning everything she touches into classic pop art".

A number of publications, authors and editors have discussed how Madonna helped influence the link between art and pop stage. Some noted how she brought art from the streets into the mainstream. For instance, referring to her formative years in New York, Malina Bickford from Vice commented on her influence in bringing the underground to the mainstream. Marissa G. Muller from W magazine also noted her contribution and credited her for help bridging the worlds of pop music and fine art. She also suggested that Madonna helped making collaborations with pop artists routine. In this aspect, Eckardt similarly argued she pioneered the crossover between pop and art by hanging with the likes of Warhol, Basquiat or Haring. Editors of Enciclopedia Gay (2009) also recognized her footprints in different art forms, and credited her for pushing the boundaries of pop music into the art world.

=== On other artists ===
Regarding inspirations Madonna took from plastic artists, music journalist Ricardo Pineda in a conversation with news agency EFE in 2019, describes her mentions and references were favorable for their legacies. Her own influence has been found in some contemporary artists; in 2015, Italian newspaper la Repubblica noted how various artists admire her. Mateo Blanco, commented: "Madonna has always been a great inspiration to me". American installation artist Trisha Baga has a "longstanding fascination" with her which "is often manifested in her work", according to Dundee Contemporary Arts' website. In 2018, Pegasus told the Evening Standard that he always listens to Madonna while working, and his works "tends to have elements of her character". Madonna has been an inspiration for Spanish painter Jesús Arrúe, according to Saatchi Art's website. In 2014, curator Jefferson Hack dedicated an article in which she was "interpreted by contemporary artists" with portraits in art forms and their feelings about her. Inside the article, Silvia Prada, described: "For me, Madonna has became even more important than any art movement in terms of history and popular culture".

Different media reports have shown her influence on other lesser-known artists, and from the underground scene. In terms of influence, the Greek Reporter said that Greek graffiti artist George Callas has a "creative obsession" with her. Brazilian visual artist, Aldo Diaz, who also collaborated with her, talked about Madonna's influence for him to the point he began to study photography, arts and became a graphic designer. Most of them have depicted Madonna.

==== Impact on Frida Kahlo mania ====
Madonna attracted media headlines when she revealed her interest in Frida Kahlo during the late 20th-century; Kahlo was considered to be a relatively lesser-known figure on the international stage outside the arts. Andrew Morton reflected: "How many pop singers have ever heard of Frida Kahlo?". In 1993, Janis Bergman-Carton published in Texas Studies in Literature and Language an article that examined how "both women have become part of standard journalistic reportage", with mutual benefit, but also reminds the "interpenetration of the domains of art and celebrityhood has a lengthy history in Western culture, dating back to the Renaissance".

Some credited Madonna's significant role for developing public's interest in Kahlo. In 2005, The Daily Telegraph staffers credited her with transforming Kahlo into a "collector's darling". Walker also argued that partly due to her, the Mexican painter became a posthumous celebrity not only in the domain of art history but also in popular culture. In 2005, Canadian author and art historian Gauvin Alexander Bailey also concurred she helped spark a "wide interest" in the artist. Back in 1993, historian Hayden Herrera added the mention of Madonna sets the tone for the entire piece. In 1991, magazine Artes de México also referred to the importance of her in the "Fridomania cult". Anthropologist Néstor García Canclini (sic) "Madonna's role in the Kahlo cult is pleasantly exciting". According to El Sol de Tampico, Madonna drew media attention to Alejandro Gómez Arias, a former Kahlo boyfriend.

== Artistic depictions ==
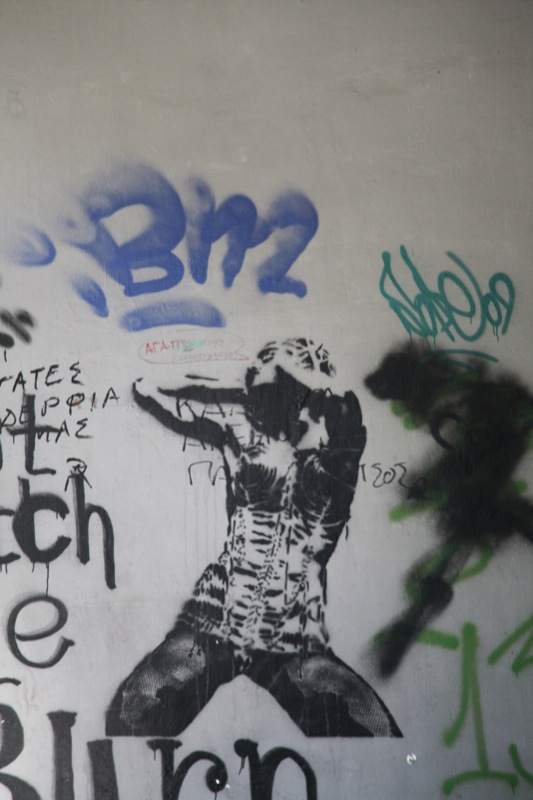
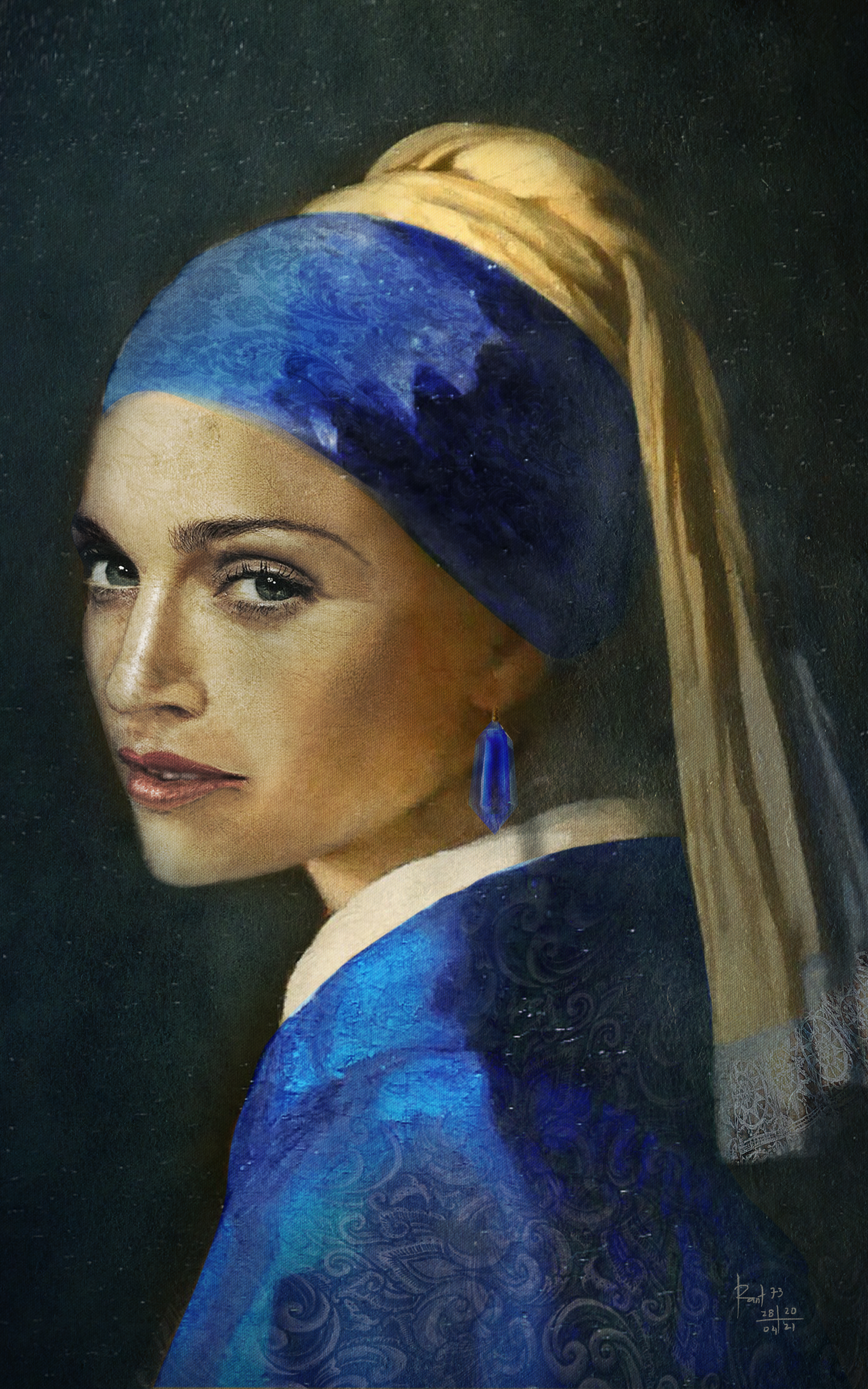
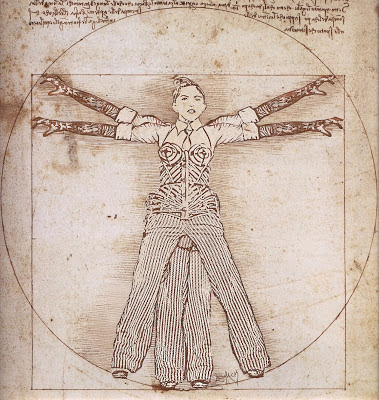
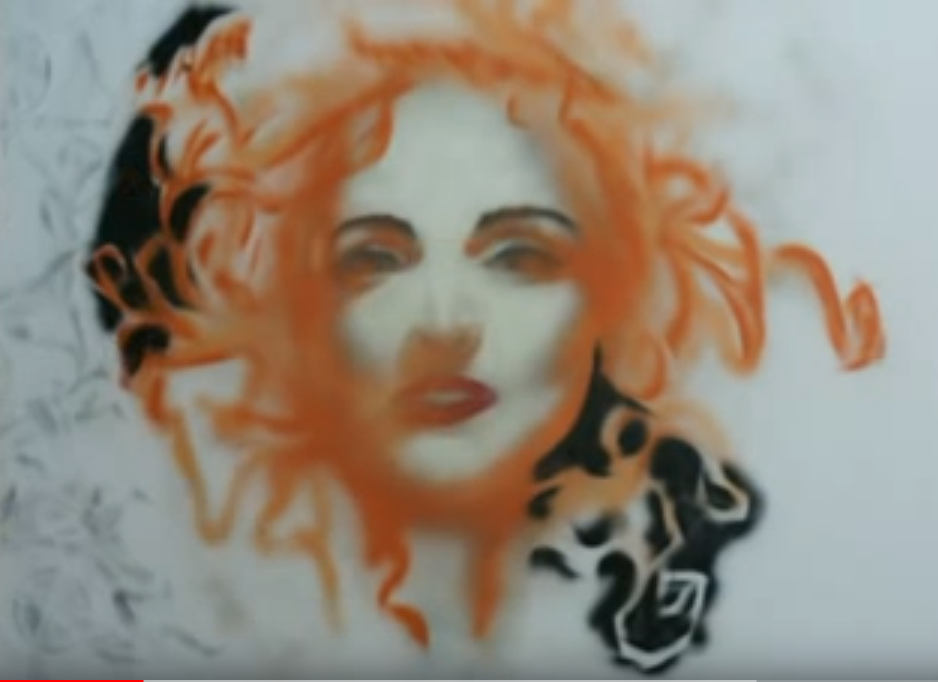
Madonna has been depicted by known artists. She has been also represented in street and fan art. From the second to fourth image, Madonna is depicted as: Girl with a Pearl Earring, the Vitruvian Man, and Medusa.

Madonna has been depicted by various artists around the world, including those who were influenced by her. Speaking about her artistic depictions of over two decades, in 2003, Walker said: "Naturally [...] many visual artists have been inspired to depict Madonna". The book Madonna in Art (2004) compiled portraits and paintings by over 116 artists from 23 countries, including Andrew Logan, Sebastian Krüger and Al Hirschfeld. Madonna in Art which contains over 244 artworks and 190 pages, is noted by its author as a "tribute to Madonna and her remarkable career in art".

Others depicted her multiple times. Scottish painter Peter Howson, who dedicated numerous pieces to her, commented in 2002: "She's a subject everyone is drawn to". Scottish academic Alan Riach, noted the Madonnas of Howson address the question of "assertion, strength and power". In his final years, Mexican painter Alberto Gironella devoted almost all his works to Madonna, or took inspiration from her, further labeled her "more than pop [she] is the last surrealist". According to the Museum of Contemporary Art of Monterrey he started with his Madonnas in 1991. Jean-Michel Basquiat's A Panel of Experts (1982) was inspired by his lovers, Madonna and Canadian painter Suzanne Mallouk.

In 2019, Spanish plastic artist Mikel Belascoain, created the first art building of Pamplona, capital city of Navarra, Spain with several paintings of her, calling the artwork Madonna 1986. Belascoain reported to be more interested in Madonna as an artist than in Marcel Duchamp. In 2005, South African artist Candice Breitz created Queen (Portrait of Madonna), a multichannel video installation featuring 24 Italian Madonna fans performing their way individually on a grid of monitors. It was exhibited in museums like SCAD Museum of Art or Museum of Fine Arts (Boston), while art critic Roberta Smith reviewed the artwork for The New York Times. In Madonnaland (2016), Alina Simone noted graffiti artist Adam Cost had begun wheat pasting his "Cost Fucked Madonna" mantra all over Manhattan in the 20th century. Simone discovered that "Cost" was his pseudonym, and his stickers reading "Cost Fucked Madonna" became an underground catch-phrase in the 1990s, "spurring a healthy trade" in knock-off T-shirts and other merchandise. Following his comeback after his arrest, "Cost Fucked Madonna" posters began reappearing on the streets of New York in 2012. On October 25, 2024 British singer Boy George painted Madonna as part of a series of artworks titled "Fame" with Castle Fine Art. It depict Madonna wearing an eyepatch, which was the signature piece to her Madame X album era. The picture resembles her look from the Crave music video.

=== Art exhibitions and museums depictions ===
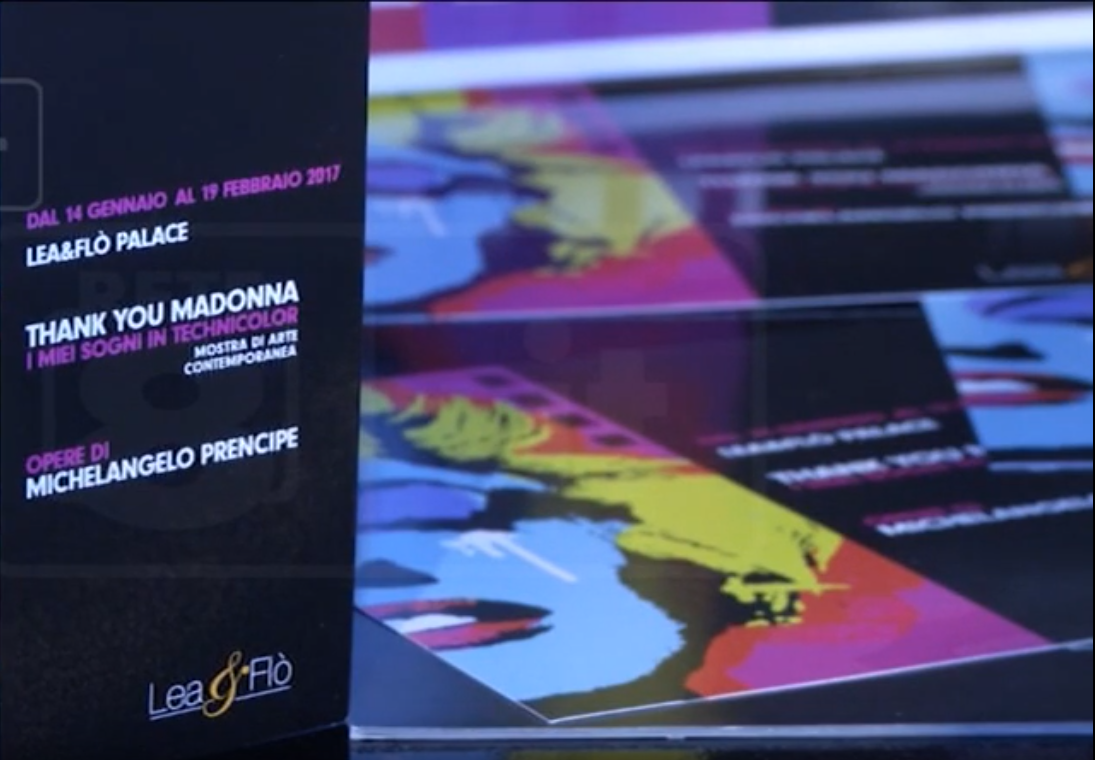
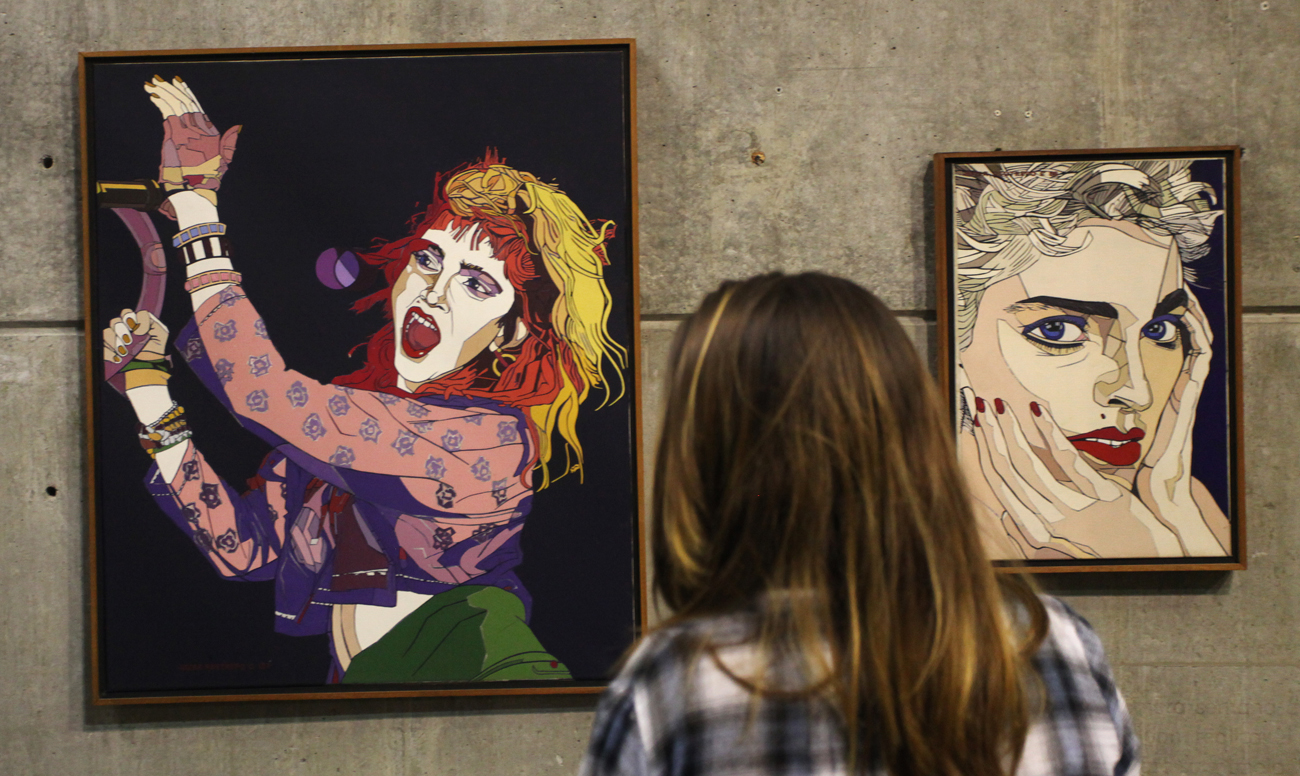
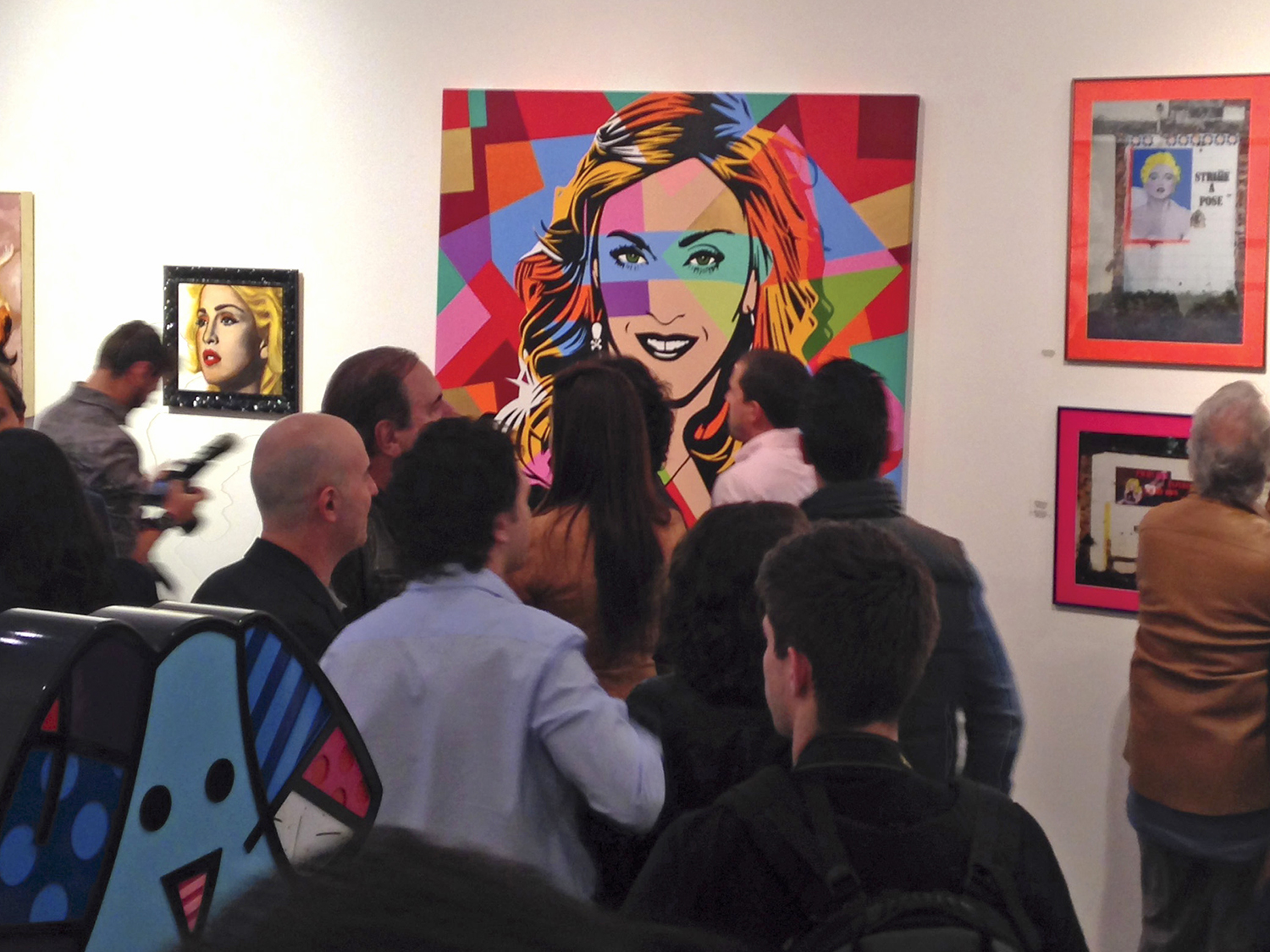
Left to right: a 2017's Madonna exhibition (Italy), 2012's Como una oración: Las Madonnas de Javier Restrepo Cuartas (Colombia), and 2014's M- de Marilyn à Madonna (Brazil)

Her likeness has been exhibited in museums, and other exhibitions. In honor of Madonna, Johnnie Walker organized the art exposition Arte urbana – Projeto Keep Walking Brazil in 2012. It featured works by 30 different graffiti artists. The same year, a Colombian art exhibition was presented at EAFIT University's arts centre, under the title Como una oración (in English: Like a Prayer), to show the Madonnas of pop artist Javier Restrepo, and demonstrating how "Madonna's universality" touched the plastic arts.

In 2013, the Guayaquil Municipal Museum hosted a multidisciplinary exhibition, titled Madonna: Ícono cultural-arte, moda y filatelia exploring her impact and references in art, fashion, philately and numismatics. In 2017, Lea & Flò Palace hosted the Italian contemporary art exhibition Thank you Madonna – I miei sogni in technicolors. In 2023-2024, the Canberra Museum and Gallery hosted the Madonna 40: A Celebration, a career retrospective, including screening of film Desperately Seeking Susan.

Madonna was included in other different thematic exhibitions. She had a special segment in Alberto Gironella's retrospective of 2004, Alberto Gironella. Barón de Betenebros (Palace of Fine Arts), and in his 1994 display, Más que pop, Madonna es la única surrealista. In 2014, M- de Marilyn à Madonna was on display in Brazil to commemorate Marilyn Monroe's death and Madonna's birthday, both of which occurred in the month of August. It featured 46 artworks of different artists. Madonna was part of the exhibition De Madonna a Madonna (in English: From Madonna to Madonna) installed in countries such as Chile (Centro Cultural Matucana 100), Spain (MUSAC) and Argentina (Juan B. Castagnino Fine Arts Museum) to approach the role of women throughout history.

=== Sculptures ===
Around 1988, in the town of Pacentro, Italy (the city of her paternal grandparents) some residents proposed putting up a 13-foot statue of a bustier-wearing Madonna, hoping as much to attract tourists as to bestow honorary citizenship on its "most famous descendant", but the proposal was vetoed by the mayor and others. The Italian sculptor Walter Pugni, who planned to erect the bronze statue, showed a 2-foot clay model to the media. In 1993, Brazilian plastic artist Nico Rocha, created a 2.3-foot statue of her to commemorate her 10-year career and her first visit to Brazil.

She is represented through various wax sculptures internationally, including France's Musée Grévin. Several wax figures of Madonna are found at Madame Tussauds in the U.S. and around the world. In 1999, Estonian outlet Sõnumileht ranked a Madonna's wax figure at number third, on their best-of list of Tussauds' wax sculptures. In the mid-2010s, Madame Tussauds Sydney launched simultaneously three different Madonna's wax statues, making the first time they revealed that amount of one female performer in their history according to themselves.

=== Selected artistic depictions ===
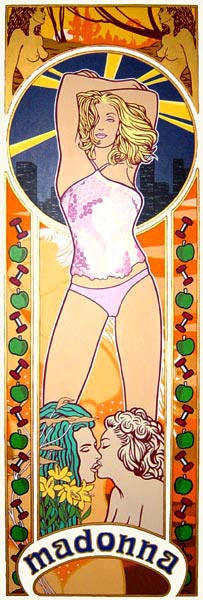
Madonna by Paul Harvey

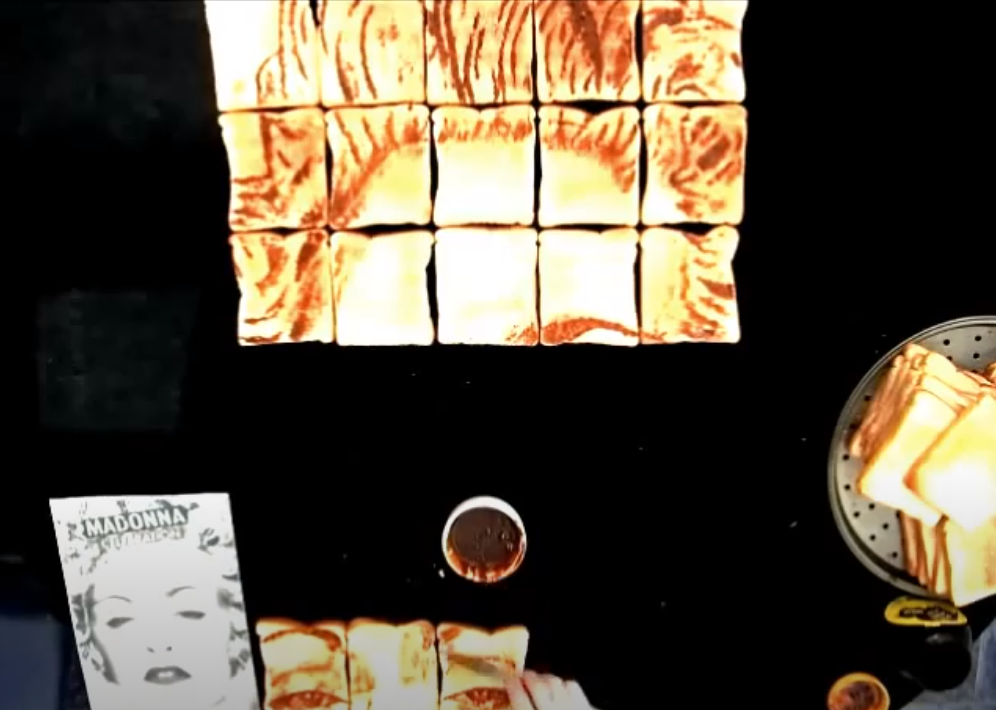
Nathan Wyburn elaborating a toast portrait of Madonna

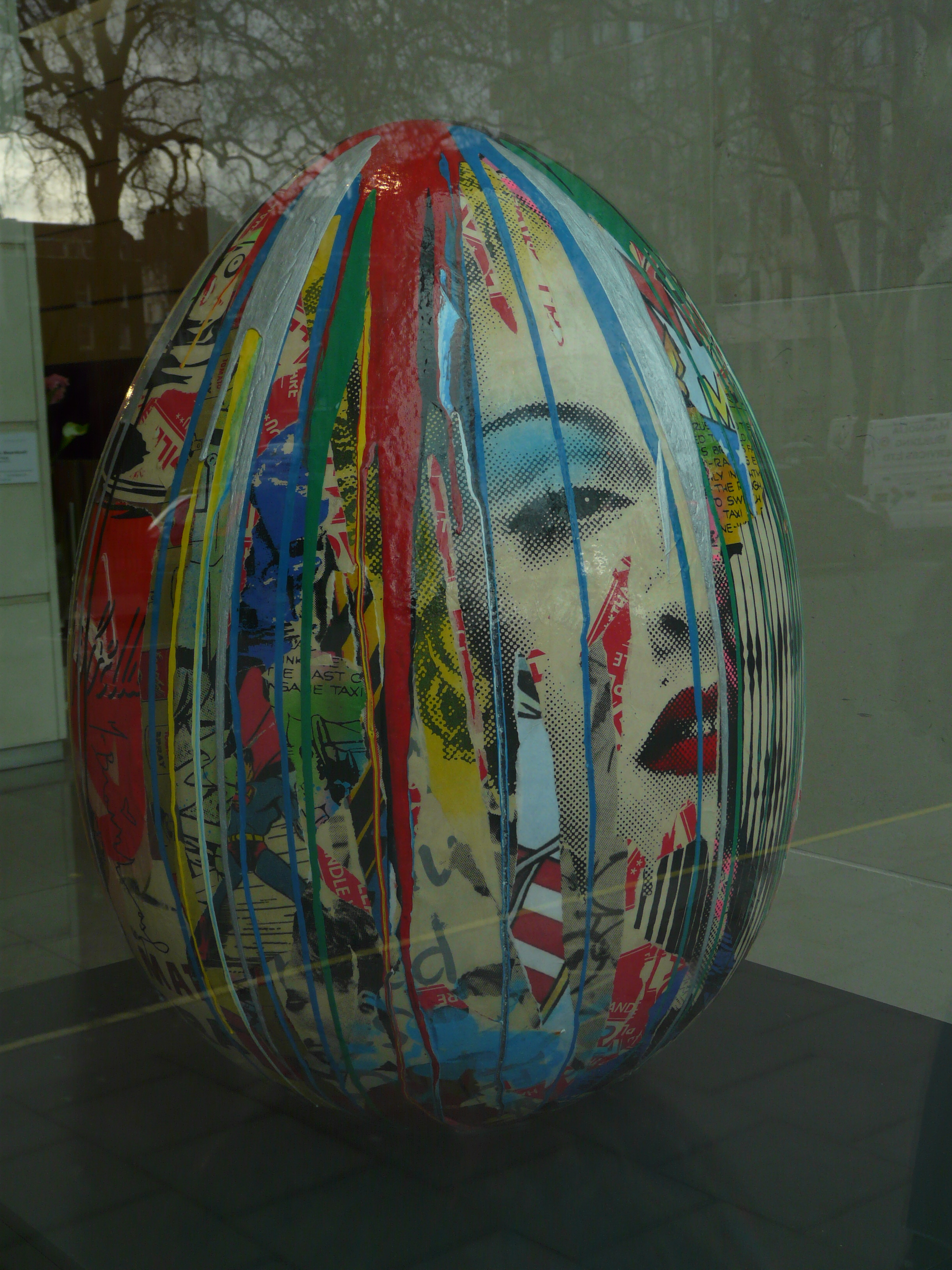
Life is Beautiful by Mr. Brainwash

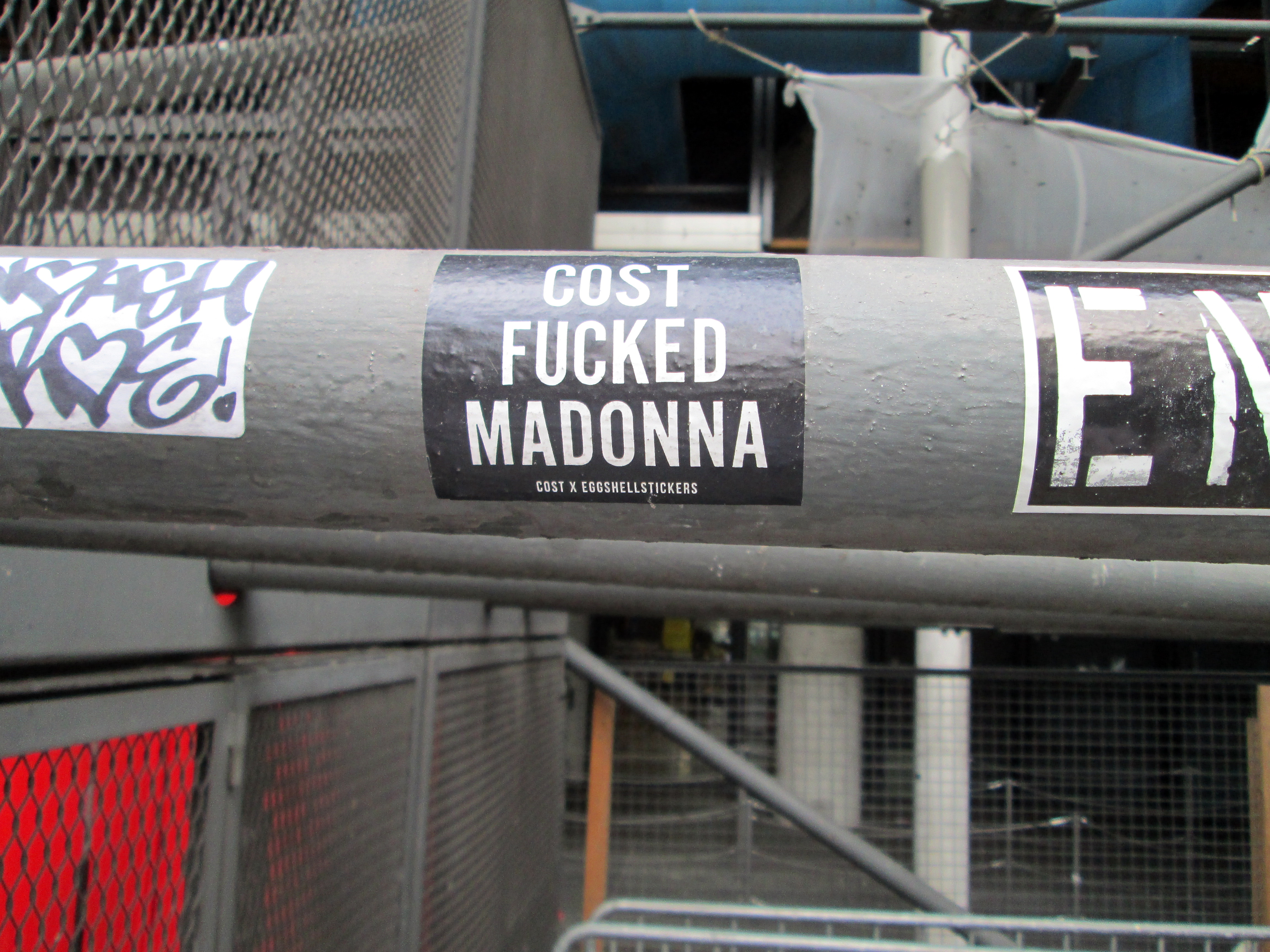
Madonna's wheatpastes by Adam Cost

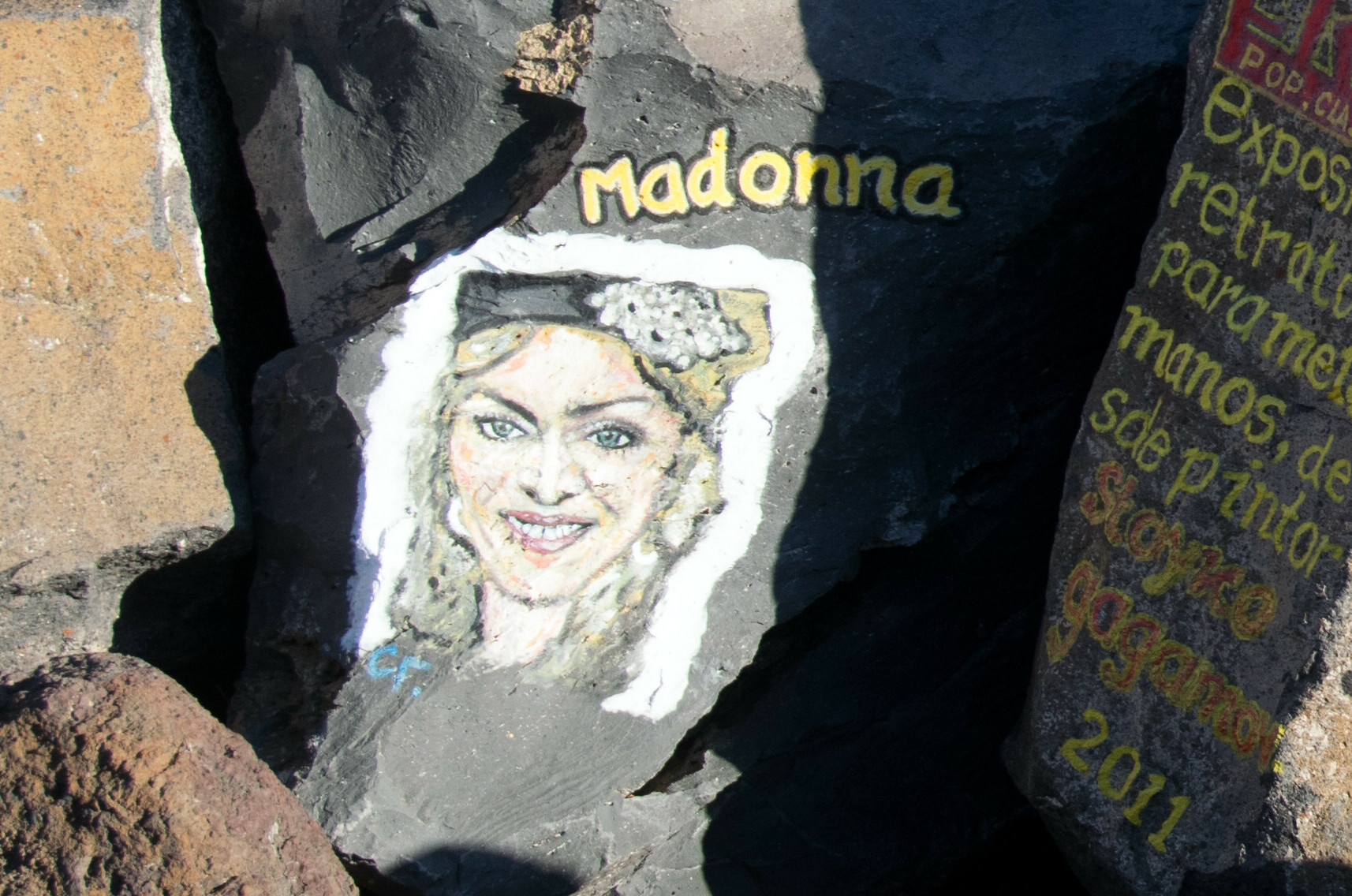
100 Faces of the Tenerife Auditorium by Bulgarian artist Stojko Gagamov

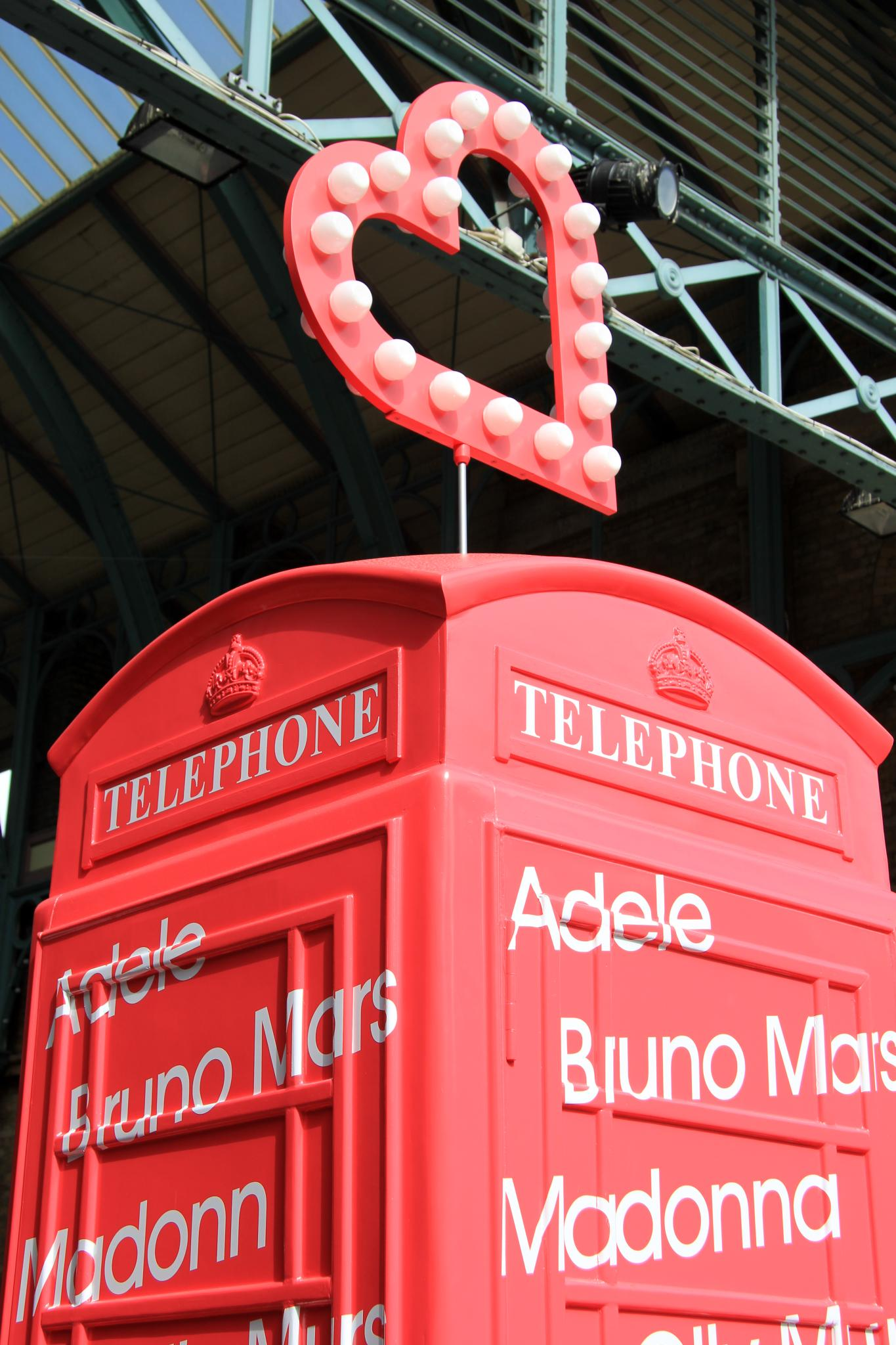
Madonna represented in Art boxes

== See also ==
- Madonna and religion

== Book sources ==
- Bailey, Gauvin A. (2005). Art of Colonial Latin America. Phaidon Press. ISBN 0714841579.
- Bayles, Martha (1996). Hole in Our Soul: The Loss of Beauty and Meaning in American Popular Music. University of Chicago Press. ISBN 0226039595.
- Beard, David; Gloag, Kenneth (2004). Musicology: The Key Concepts. Routledge. ISBN 1134372795.
- Bego, Mark (1992). Madonna: Blonde Ambition. Harmony Books. ISBN 0517582422.
- Belán, Kyra (2018). The Virgin in Art. Parkstone International. ISBN 978-1683255925.
- Berger, Arthur Asa (2018). Perspectives on Everyday Life: A Cross Disciplinary Cultural Analysis. Springer. ISBN 978-3319997957.
- Bonito Oliva, Achille (2000). Los Manifiestos del Arte Posmoderno (in Spanish). Ediciones AKAL. ISBN 8446011107.
- Benstock, Shari; Ferriss, Suzanne (1994). On Fashion. Rutgers University Press. ISBN 0813520339.
- Bright, Susan; Aletti, Vince (2007). Face of Fashion. Aperture. ISBN 978-1597110396.
- Burt, Richard (1994). The Administration of Aesthetics. University of Minnesota Press. ISBN 0816623678.
- Ciccone, Christopher (2008). Life with My Sister Madonna. Simon & Schuster. ISBN 978-1416587620.
- Chancer, Lynn S. (1998). Reconcilable Differences: Confronting Beauty, Pornography, and the Future of Feminism. University of California Press. ISBN 0520209230.
- Chatzipapatheodoridis, Constantine (2021). The Music Diva Spectacle. Intellect Books. ISBN 978-1789384383.
- Cody, Gabrielle; Cheng, Meiling (2015). Reading Contemporary Performance: Theatricality Across Genres. Routledge. ISBN 978-1136246562.
- Cross, Mary (2007). Madonna: A Biography. Greenwood Publishing Group. ISBN 978-0-313-33811-3.
- Deutsch, Didier C. (2000). MusicHound Soundtracks: The Essential Album Guide to Film, Television and Stage Music. Visible Ink. ISBN 1578591015.
- DK (2012). Dance: From Ballet to Breakin'—Step into the Dazzling World of Dance. Penguin House. ISBN 978-1465407726.
- Elkins, James (2013). Is Art History Global?. Routledge. ISBN 978-1135867669.
- Faith, Karlene; Wasserlein, Frances (1997). Madonna, Bawdy & Soul. University of Toronto Press. ISBN 0-802-04208-2.
- Falco, Howard (2010). I AM: The Power of Discovering Who You Really Are. Penguin. ISBN 978-1101442678.
- Flynn, Paul (2017). Good As You: From Prejudice to Pride – 30 Years of Gay Britain. Random House. ISBN 978-1473529175.
- Fhlathúin, Máire Ní (1998). The Legacy of Colonialism: Gender and Cultural Identity in Postcolonial Societies. Galway University Press. ISBN 1901421155.
- Frith, Simon (2004). Popular Music: The rock era. Psychology Press. ISBN 0415332680.
- Gardner, Abigail (2016). 'Rock On': Women, Ageing and Popular Music. Taylor & Francis. ISBN 978-1317189091.
- García Canclini, Néstor (1991). Cultura y pospolítica: el debate sobre la modernidad en América Latina. Consejo Nacional para la Cultura y las Artes. ISBN 9682948304.
- Gilbert, Sandra M.; Gubar, Susan (2021). Still Mad: American Women Writers and the Feminist Imagination. W. W. Norton & Company. ISBN 978-0393651720.
- Guilbert, Georges-Claude (2015). Madonna as Postmodern Myth. McFarland. ISBN 978-0-786-48071-5.
- Gnojewski, Carol (2007). Madonna: Express Yourself. Enslow Publishers. ISBN 978-0766024427.
- Gnojewski, Carol (2017). Madonna: Fighting for Self-Expression. Enslow Publishing. ISBN 978-0766092556.
- Greenberg, Brian; Watts, Linda; Greenwald, Richard A. (2008). Social History of the United States. ABC-CLIO. ISBN 978-1598841282.
- Grimes, William (2013). The New York Times: The Times of the Eighties. Hachette UK. ISBN 978-1603763288.
- Hanley, Jason (2015). We Rock! (Music Lab): A Fun Family Guide for Exploring Rock Music History. Quarry Books. ISBN 978-1592539215.
- Harris, Roy (2003). Necessity of Artspeak: The Language of Arts in the Western Tradition. A&C Black. ISBN 1441129278.
- Harrison, Thomas R. (2011). Music of the 1980s. ABC-CLIO. ISBN 978-0-313-36599-7.
- Harrison, Thomas (2017). Pop Goes the Decade: The Eighties. ABC-CLIO. ISBN 978-1440836671.
- Harry, Lou; Furman, Eric (2005). In the Can. Emmis Books. ISBN 1578602386.
- Huss, Boaz; Pasi, Marco; von Stuckrad, Kocku (2010). Kabbalah and Modernity: Interpretations, Transformations, Adaptations. Brill Publishers. ISBN 978-9004182875.
- Havranek, Carrie (2009). Women Icons of Popular Music. Greenwood Press. ISBN 978-0-313-34085-7.
- Heatley, Michael (2008). Where Were You When-- the Music Played?. Reader's Digest Association. ISBN 978-0-7621-0988-3.
- Hoesterey, Ingeborg (2001). Pastiche: Cultural Memory in Art, Film, Literature. Indiana University Press. ISBN 0253338808.
- Inglis, Ian (2013). Performance and Popular Music: History, Place and Time. Ashgate Publishing. ISBN 978-1409493549.
- Jennex, Craig; Fast, Susan (2019). Popular Music and the Politics of Hope. Taylor & Francis. ISBN 978-1351677813.
- King, Debra Walker; King, Katie (2000). Body Politics and the Fictional Double. Indiana University Press. ISBN 0253214092.
- Kellner, Douglas (2003). Media Culture. Routledge. ISBN 1134845707.
- Lenig, Stuart (2010). The Twisted Tale of Glam Rock. Bloomsbury Academic. ISBN 978-0313379864.
- Leibetseder, Doris (2016). Queer Tracks: Subversive Strategies in Rock and Pop Music. Routledge. ISBN 978-1317072584.
- McRobbie, Angela (2003). Postmodernism and Popular Culture. Routledge. ISBN 1134900872.
- MARCO (2002). Mexican masters of the 20th century. Museo de Arte Contemporáneo de Monterrey. ISBN 9686623566.
- May, John R. (1997). The New Image of Religious Film. Rowman & Littlefield. ISBN 1-55612-761-8.
- Miklitsch, Robert (1998). From Hegel to Madonna: Towards a General Economy of "Commodity Fetishism". Duke University Press. ISBN 978-0-822-36460-3.
- Moffat, Alexander; Riach, Alan; Macdonald-Lewis, Linda (2020). Arts of Resistance. Luath Press. ISBN 978-1913025762.
- Morton, Andrew (2001). Madonna. Macmillan Publishers. ISBN 0-312-98310-7.
- O'Brien, Lucy (2007). Madonna: Like an Icon. Bantam Press. ISBN 978-0-593-05547-2.
- Rambarran, Shara (2021). Virtual Music: Sound, Music, and Image in the Digital Era. Bloomsbury Publishing. ISBN 978-1501333613.
- Rettenmund, Matthew (1995). Encyclopedia Madonnica. St. Martin's Griffin. ISBN 0312117825.
- Rolling Stone Press (1997). Madonna, the Rolling stone files. Hyperion. ISBN 0786881542.
- Rudden, Patricia Spence (2009). Singing for Themselves: Essays on Women in Popular Music. Cambridge Scholars Publishing. ISBN 978-1443808699.
- Rutherford, Paul (2007). A World Made Sexy: Freud to Madonna. University of Toronto Press. ISBN 978-0802094667.
- Schwichtenberg, Cathy (1993). The Madonna connection. Westview Press. ISBN 0813313961.
- Schuler, Catherine (2013). Women in Russian Theatre: The Actress in the Silver Age. Routledge. ISBN 978-1136155970.
- Sexton, Adam (1993). Desperately Seeking Madonna: In Search of The Meaning of The World's Most Famous Woman. Random House. ISBN 0385306881.
- Sexton, Jamie (2007). Music, Sound and Multimedia: From the Live to the Virtual. Edinburgh University Press. ISBN 978-0748630905.
- Simone, Alina (2016). Madonnaland. University of Texas Press. ISBN 978-0-292-75946-6.
- Stallabrass, Julian (2006). Contemporary Art: A Very Short Introduction. Oxford University Press. ISBN 019157810X.
- Stange, Mary Zeiss; Oyster, Carol K.; Sloan, Jane E. (2011). Encyclopedia of Women in Today's World. Vol. 1. SAGE Publishing. ISBN 978-1-4129-7685-5.
- Tannahill, Jordan (2015). Theatre of the Unimpressed: In Search of Vital Drama. Coach House Books. ISBN 978-1770564114.
- Thom, Paul (2000). Making Sense: A Theory of Interpretation. Rowman & Littlefield. ISBN 1461639085.
- Walker, John A. (1993). Arts TV: A History of Arts Television in Britain. Indiana University Press. ISBN 0861964357.
- Walker, John A. (2003). Art and Celebrity. Pluto Press. ISBN 0745318509.
- Ward, Glenn (2010). Understand Postmodernism: Teach Yourself. Hachette UK. ISBN 978-1444133981.
- Ward, Glenn (2011). Discover Postmodernism: Flash. Hachette UK. ISBN 978-1444141269.
- Yanıkkaya, Berrin; Nairn, Angelique Margarita (2020). Multidisciplinary Perspectives on Women, Voice, and Agency. IGI Global. ISBN 978-1-79984-830-1.

=== Non-English books ===
- Aguilar Guzmán, Marcela (2010). Domadores de historias. Conversaciones con grandes cronistas de América Latina (in Spanish). RIL Editores. ISBN 978-956-284-782-7.
- Clement, Jennifer (2016). La Vedova Basquiat (in Italian). Arnoldo Mondadori Editore. ISBN 978-8851052324.
- Rißler-Pipka, Nanette; Lommel, Michael; Cempel, Justyna (2015). Der Surrealismus in der Mediengesellschaft (in German). Verlag. ISBN 978-3839412381.
