= Art for charity =

Art for charity is the practice of using art in some way to serve charitable causes. Artists may produce works specifically to be sold for charity or creators or owners of artistic works might donate all or part of the proceeds of sale to a good cause. Such sales are often conducted by auction. Investors look at both auctions and donations to art-related charities when considering philanthropy opportunities. Alternatively, works may be exhibited (and possibly be available for sale) with ticket sales being donated. Such exhibitions sometimes incorporate art related to or by those who benefit from the charitable donations.

== History ==
Art for charity has roots going back to the early twentieth century. For example, in 1933 an art exhibition in New York City was held to benefit the New York City Visiting Committee of the State Charities Aid Association.

== See also ==
- Artist–Museum Partnership Act
