= Pegasus (artist) =

Street artist from Chicago

"Pegasus" is the pseudonym and signature of a North London street artist. The artist, born 1988, is originally from Chicago but best known for his work in England. His stencilled pieces play with popular culture's most recognizable icons, including Marilyn Monroe, JFK, Amy Winehouse, and Lucille Ball, and sometimes are ironic or controversial. The artist has stated that his influences include "the genius Andy Warhol. I also admire other artists such as Robert Rauschenberg, Keith Haring, Mr. Brainwash, Darren West the Neon Artist, Horace Panter, Eelus and of course Mr. Banksy." He told Evening Standard that always listens to Madonna as he works and his work "tends to have elements of her character".

As well as designing the front cover of the publication Encyclopedia Madonnica by Matthew Rettenmund, Pegasus is featured in two books published in 2013. They are titled Happy Graffiti and Planet Banksy.

== Notable artwork ==
Alexandra Burke, the chart-topping singer who won X Factor in 2008, was presented personally with a bespoke painting by Pegasus while she celebrated her 25th birthday.

Pegasus depicted Barack Obama ripping open a white shirt, superman-style, to reveal the Human Rights Campaign's famous pink and red square emblem. This work came after President Obama became the first US president to announce support for marriage equality in May 2012. The artwork can be viewed outside Bistro De La Gare, Pentonville Rd, Kings Cross, London.

Pegasus created an image of British Olympic diver Tom Daley on the Royal Vauxhall Tavern, London. It is a life-size street-art stencil of Britain's Olympic medalist brandishing a groin-level declaration that 'All We Need Is Love', complete with rainbow-hued love-heart. This piece addressed the debate over LGBT rights at the 2013 Winter Olympics at Sochi, Russia.

In January 2016, Pegasus produced a tribute to David Bowie in London's Turnpike Lane in the wake of his death.

In February 2016, Pegasus created a depiction of US Presidential candidate, Donald Trump in North Street, Bristol. as well as super-sized piece entitled "I got 99 problems but an Oscar ain't one" outside the entrance to the Dolby Theatre in Hollywood, California where the 2016 Academy Awards ceremony was being held.

Pegasus' Trump image was described by the Bristol Post as one of the most controversial pieces of Street Art in the city alongside work of John D'Oh and Banksy

In April 2016, Pegasus produced a piece of street art as a celebration of the life of Prince after the announcement of the musician's death was made. NME magazine described the piece as "one of the best out there".

In May 2016, Pegasus created images of David and Victoria Beckham on Pricelet Street, London just off Brick Lane, famous as a destination for street art. Victoria Beckham has been quoted as saying she was "flattered" by the depictions.

December 2016 saw Pegasus create a depiction of Charlie Chaplin with the message "Dream Big" in the Cheshire town of Congleton, which is visible in the town's Swan Bank.

=== Amy Winehouse ===
Pegasus is perhaps best known for Fallen Angel, an image of Amy Winehouse on the side of a Camden information centre (Starbucks) that was whitewashed over before being repainted and 'opened' by Winehouse's mother Janis in December 2013. The artwork was the site of an unofficial shrine for Ms Winehouse in the days after the singer's death in 2011. Pegasus said: "I am so pleased that my Amy Angel work means so much to people. I love Amy and the world is a much poorer place without her. Her legacy will be remembered forever and the work the Amy Winehouse Foundation is doing is testimony to her kindness and love for others." The Camden New Journal printed an image of a fan revealing a tattoo of Pegasus' famous Amy piece, complete with the Pegasus tag of a flying horse.

Atmosphere is the second art piece by Pegasus dedicated to the late Amy Winehouse in the singer's home area of Camden. It can be found on the wall of The Earl of Camden pub. The public graffiti image of the singer coincided with an exhibition on Winehouse at the Jewish Museum, which launched in July 2013. Proud Camden CEO Alex Proud said: "I am honoured and very humbled that Pegasus has chosen Proud Camden as the location for his ode to Amy. It's been amazing how so many people have rallied around the #Amys30 celebrations and are supporting the Amy Winehouse Foundation helping to continue the amazing work they are doing in Amy's memory."

In March 2017 Pegasus created an interactive installation for “Amy Winehouse, A family portrait” exhibition at the Jewish Museum in Camden.

=== The British Royal Family ===
Pegasus made headlines with a stencil showing the Duchess of Cambridge as the Virgin Mary with Prince George of Cambridge as baby Jesus. The image, inspired by the 14th-century painting Madonna And Child by Italian artist Duccio di Buoninsegna, was created in view of the impending birth of a presumptive heir to the British throne. The painting was exhibited at the Hoxton Arches gallery in London's East End in 2013 and is the fifth Royal portrait by Pegasus. Previous work featuring the royal family includes Queen Elizabeth II dressed in her crown and Geri Halliwell's Union Jack swimsuit. The painting is located at the Caledonian Road.

There is also a nude Prince Harry, inspired by the media images of him while he was holidaying in Las Vegas. This work can be found in the bathrooms of the Winchester Bar in Angel as well as at the skate park along the Embankment in London.

An original depiction of Diana, Princess of Wales, was publicly displayed in July 2016 at the launch exhibition of Gods and Monsters in London. and later in Cheshire. Pegasus recreated his Diana theme to mark the 20th anniversary of her death with a street art creation in London, in which she is depicted as queen of hearts.

A 'tongue in cheek' depiction of Meghan Markle, Prince Harry's then-girlfriend, was unveiled in London in November 2016, entitled 'Harry's Girl'. Pegasus created a painting on the rear of his gallery's van to celebrate the engagement of Prince Harry and Meghan Markle, which resulted in him being questioned by the Metropolitan Police.

== Exclusive editions ==
As well as producing his street graffiti, Pegasus occasionally produces small collections of hand sprayed original works, paper editions and short-run screen print editions including depictions of The Queen, Diana Princess of Wales, Amy Winehouse, Madonna, Charlie Chaplin, David Beckham and Debbie Harry amongst many other iconic images.

One of Pegasus' hand sprayed editions of the Queen was displayed in Cheshire's Attitude Gallery in Spring 2016.

A spray painted canvas featuring Diana, Princess of Wales entitled 'Act of Kindness' was unveiled by Pegasus in July 2016 during the launch event for his 'Gods and Monsters' exhibition followed up by a second work also featuring Diana entitled 'Life is a Journey' unveiled at Pegasus' October exhibition in Los Angeles.

== Exhibitions ==
In October 2015, three pieces were inducted into the Hollywood Museum in Los Angeles and are on permanent display. They were Pegasus' Marilyn Monroe, Bette Davis and Lucille Ball.

=== Solo shows ===
Pegasus held his first solo show at Faith Inc Gallery, London on 6 December 2014. The actor Johnny Depp attended and purchased one of his artworks of the Duchess of Cambridge.

The second solo show was an exhibition entitled 'Gods and Monsters', which ran from July 2016 to December 2016 at London's Faith Inc. Gallery, Los Angeles' Artist's Corner and Cheshire's Attitude Gallery.

In October 2018 his 3rd solo exhibition called 'Neon Nights' was attended by Jessie Wallace, Judge Rinder, Janis Winehouse and Alan Carr. All paintings sold out on the opening night. Pegasus gave an interview on London Live before the opening of the show.

== Celebrity and famous clients ==
Pegasus has a A-List and celebrity following and he has received commissions from Lindsay Lohan and England Rugby legend Ben Cohen amongst others. Pegasus has also produced painted canvases for entertainer, Alan Carr, singer, Alexandra Burke and professional ballroom dancer, Kristina Rihanoff.

The Sunday Mirror on 22 May 2016 reported that Pegasus and his management were in the process of brokering a deal with the Vatican for Pope Francis to obtain a Pegasus creation of Mother Teresa, an image that is planned to feature in the artist's Gods and Monsters exhibition.
