= Austin Scaggs =

American music journalist

- Born: August 2, 1978 (age 48)
- Occupation: Music journalist
- Family: Boz Scaggs (father)

Austin William Scaggs (born August 2, 1978) is an American music critic and a contributing editor for Rolling Stone magazine. He has also written for Men's Journal. His father is musician Boz Scaggs.

== Early life ==
Scaggs was born to Boz and Carmella Scaggs. Jann Wenner (the eventual editor and publisher of Rolling Stone) served as their witness at their wedding. Austin was born in San Francisco and grew up, along with his brother Oscar, in Presidio Heights. He attended the Town School for Boys. His parents divorced in 1980, and after a three-and-a-half-year battle, they were awarded joint custody. Carmella would bring her sons to Tower Records on Tuesdays to peruse the newly-released music.

== Career ==
Scaggs read Rolling Stone as a child, but never planned to go into music journalism. At 19, he moved from San Francisco to New York City to play guitar in a band, and began interning at Rolling Stone. He loved it and eventually began picking up small assignments. After two years, he began receiving travel assignments. Four years into his job, he was assigned the section "Random Notes", which, incidentally, had been his favorite section as a child. He has interviewed many prominent musicians, including Bob Dylan, Mick Jagger, and Ray Charles . Scaggs will sometimes get inebriated with the artists he interviews; he did ecstasy with James Blunt. In regard to his interviewing style, he has said that he does not "write to stir up controversy, make tabloid headlines, or get someone busted".

Since 2001, Alex Levy and Austin Scaggs have planned annual tribute nights to various artists, along with their Cabin Down Below Band, in the East Village in New York City and Nashville.

Scaggs plays bass. He is an avid poker player and occasionally plays in celebrity tournaments.

== Personal life ==
His brother Oscar died of a heroin overdose in 1998 at 21 years old.

He is married with two children.
