= Artist–Museum Partnership Act =

The Artist–Museum Partnership Act is a United States bill that was proposed to amend the Internal Revenue Code of 1986 to allow taxpayers who create literary, musical, artistic, or scholarly compositions or similar property a fair market value (determined at the time of contribution) tax deduction for contributions of such properties, the copyrights thereon, or both, to certain tax-exempt organizations, if such properties are properly appraised and are donated no sooner than 18 months after their creation. The bill would place limits on the amount of such deduction based upon the donor's artistic adjusted gross income, as defined by this Act.

The bill was first introduced to the United States Congress by Democratic Senator of Vermont, Patrick Leahy on February 14, 2005. At that time the bill was referred to the Committee on Finance. The measure has passed the Senate more than once in the past several years, but it still hasn't become law.

== Current law ==
Under current law, artists who donate self-created works are only able to deduct the cost of supplies such as canvas, pen, paper and ink, which does not even come close to their true value. Prior to 1969, artists and collectors alike were able to take a deduction equivalent to the fair market value of a work, but Congress changed the law with respect to artists in the Tax Reform Act of 1969. Since then, fewer and fewer artists have donated their works to museums and cultural institutions.
