= Bibliography of works on Madonna =

Works on Madonna
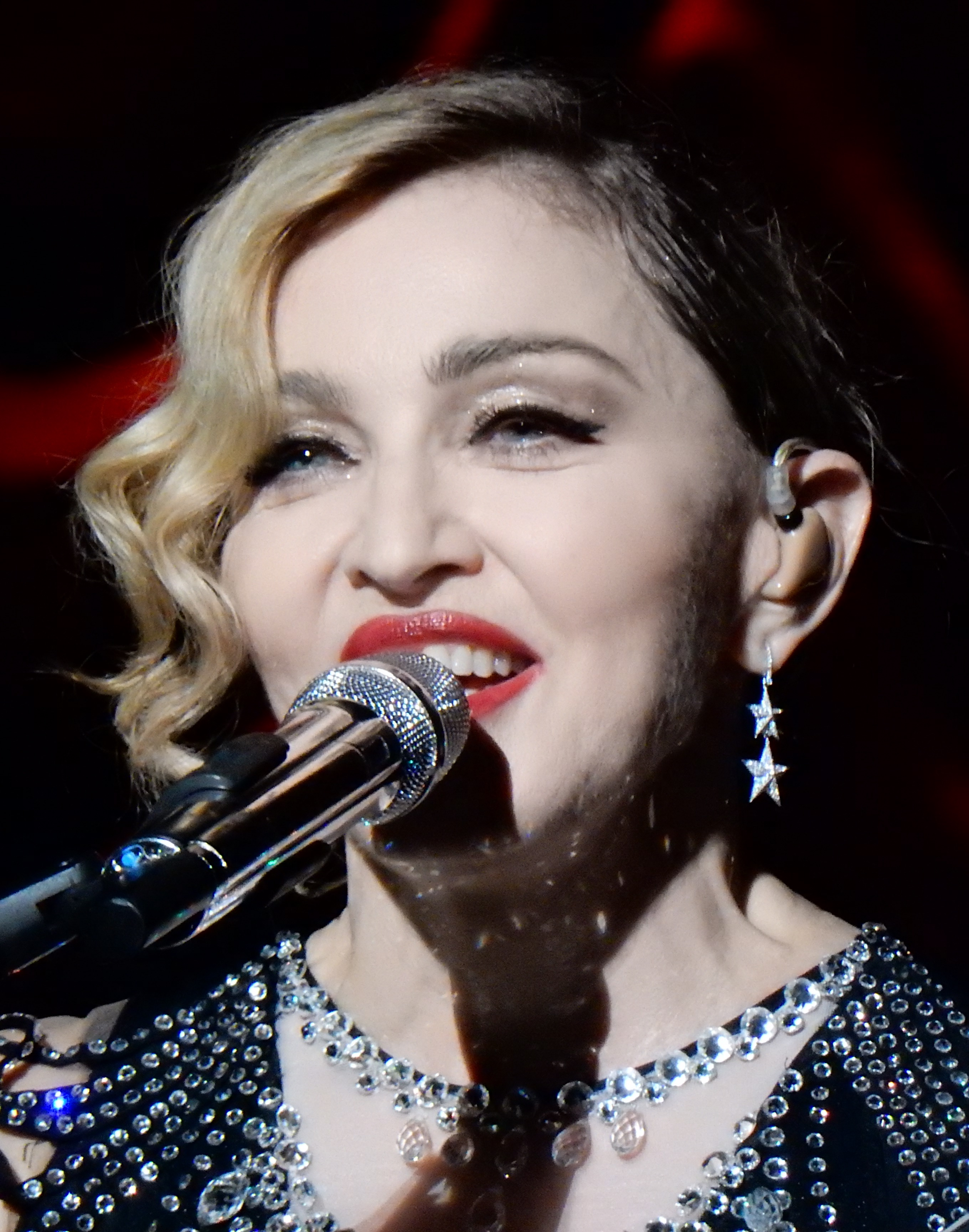
- The literature on Madonna is substantially large and unfathomable, inspiring "a mini publishing industry all her own".
- Books in English: 75
- Non-English books: 20
- Essays and other works: 9

This is a list containing the different written works about Madonna, including biographies and other literary forms. (Note: The list does not contain works where Madonna is the secondary theme. Hence books like Strategies for Theory: From Marx to Madonna (2003), Something in the Way She Moves: Dancing Women from Salome to Madonna (2004) and A World Made Sexy: Freud to Madonna (2007) are not included in this list. It also excludes books which mention Madonna without making her the main subject, or reference works which only list her records.) Many authors have written more than one book about Madonna and these have been published in multiple languages other than English, including German, French, Dutch, Spanish and Italian. (Note: Multiple editions of the same release by an author are noted with the different catalogue number in the adjoining reference against the table entry.) The releases have sometimes become bestsellers and have faced varied reception from critics and academics. The staff of Xtra Magazine commented that "she has inspired a mini publishing industry all her own". Maura Johnston said that "the appetite for books on Madonna is large, and the variety of approaches writers, editors, and photographers have taken to craft their portraits is a testament to how her career has both inspired and provoked". On the report of Eric Weisbard "only Madonna books proliferated" compared to her other contemporary fellows from the 1980s. Evelyn Briceno from La Tercera described her as a character worthy of biographies, photo books and various analyses.

According to critic Paul Northup who wrote in Third Way magazine, "eminent authors and academics have pored over her tirelessly since she burst onto the pop scene in the early Eighties." The continual interest by many writers towards Madonna was expressed by Rodrigo Fresán in 2008: "and the years go by and life changes but something remains constant: one continues to write about Madonna", while J. Randy Taraborrelli wrote in 2018, "I have never stopped writing about Madonna since that day I first met her thirty-five years ago". The literature about Madonna is "extensive" according to associate professor Robert Miklitsch of Ohio University, and Stephen Brown from University of Ulster described "is almost mind-boggling in its abundance". Pamela Church Gibson from University of the Arts London realized it saying in Fashion and Celebrity Culture (2013), "there is a veritable library of literature available" on Madonna.

Biographies released about the singer include Madonna: An Intimate Biography (2002) by Taraborrelli, Madonna (2001) by Andrew Morton, Madonna: Like an Icon (2007) by Lucy O'Brien, Life with My Sister Madonna (2008) by her brother Christopher Ciccone, and Madonna: A Rebel Life (2023) by Mary Gabriel. Morton's biography was criticized by Madonna herself and she was also against the release of Ciccone's book, which ultimately led to a rift between the siblings.

== Books written in English ==
=== 1980s ===
Book title	Year	Author(s)	Publisher	Pages	Identifiers	Notes	Ref(s).
Madonna: Lucky Star	1985	Michael Mackenzie	Olympic Marketing Corp	94	ISBN 978-0-809-25233-6	The biography concentrated on Madonna's childhood.	
Madonna	1985	Philip Kamin	Hal Leonard Corporation	48	ISBN 978-0-863-59283-6	A photography book containing images from Madonna's tour.	
Madonna!	1985	Mark Bego	Pinnacle Books	189	ISBN 978-0-523-42576-4; OCLC 12155379	Bego talks about Madonna's life in Detroit and New York City.	
Madonna	1985	Anton Rush	Anabas Books	28	ISBN 978-1-850-99011-6	A board book containing Madonna's biography in words and pictures.	
Holiday with Madonna	1985	Gordon Matthews	Simon & Schuster	63	ISBN 978-0-671-60375-5	Matthews analyzed Madonna as a new singer in the music business.	
Madonna	1986	Keith Elliot Greenberg	Lerner Publishing Group	40	ISBN 978-0-822-51606-4	Talks about how Madonna achieved fame and her appearances in music videos and films.	
Madonna: An Illustrated Biography	1988	Debbi Voller	Omnibus Press	96	ISBN 978-0-711-91466-7; OCLC 26299920	Analyzes Madonna's early fashion style. Another version was released in 1992.	
Madonna: The Biography	1989	Robert Matthew-Walker	Pan Books	160	ISBN 978-0-330-31482-4; OCLC 26313419	Biography which also includes the singer's business acumen and her marriage to actor Sean Penn.	

=== 1990s ===
Book title	Year	Author(s)	Publisher	Pages	Identifiers	Notes	Ref(s).
Madonna in Her Own Words	1990	Mick St. Michael	Omnibus Press	128	ISBN 978-0-711-92139-9; OCLC 231428597	Contains direct quotes from the singer about her career. A German version was released in 1991 by Goldmann publishers, titled Madonna: Selbstbekenntnisse. There were two other version released, one in 1999 and another in 2004.	
Madonna	1991	Marie Cahill	Gallery Books	96	ISBN 978-0-831-75705-2; OCLC 51354378	Chronicles Madonna's music and film career, her marriage to Penn and her concert tours. Another version was released in 1992 through Omnibus Press, and in 1993 a Spanish version was released, translated by Silvia Rodríguez Díaz.	
Madonna: Unauthorized	1991	Christopher Andersen	Simon & Schuster	350	ISBN 978-0-671-73532-6; OCLC 1036695644	Includes commentary from Madonna's family, friends, former lovers, and associates. Two other versions include a Danish one (1991) and reprinted one (1992).	
Like a Virgin: Madonna Revealed	1991	Douglas Thompson	Blake Publishing	240	ISBN 978-1-856-85009-4; OCLC 243771799	Detailed information about the singer's personal relationships. Another version was released in 1992 with the name Madonna Revealed: The Unauthorized Biography.	
Madonna Superstar: Photographs	1991	Karl Lagerfeld	W. W. Norton & Company	93	ISBN 978-0-393-30766-5; OCLC 317360827	Photography book about Madonna's career from her first album to the end of 1987.	
Madonna: Her Complete Story An Unauthorized Biography	1991	David James	Publications International Ltd.	80	ISBN 978-0-451-82246-8; OCLC 24634651	Includes numerous unseen photographs.	
Madonna: The Book	1992	Norman King	William Morrow and Company	256	ISBN 978-0-688-11916-4; OCLC 236051812	Contains direct quotes about Madonna from academics.	
The Madonna Scrapbook	1992	Lee Randall	Carol Publishing Group	220	ISBN 978-0-806-51297-6; OCLC 471015357	A scrapbook with the singer's concert pictures, album and magazine covers and spreads.	
Madonna Illustrated	1992	Tim Riley	Hyperion Books	112	ISBN 978-1-562-82983-4; OCLC 25832167	Features more than 100 photographs with anecdotes by the author.	
Madonna: The Style Book	1992	Debbie Voller	Omnibus Press	94	ISBN 978-0-711-92771-1; OCLC 877696147	Analysis of Madonna's fashion from her early career to more sophisticated clothing. A new edition was released in 1999 covering till the Ray of Light album era styles.	
Madonna: Blonde Ambition	1992	Mark Bego	Harmony Books	308	ISBN 978-0-517-58242-8; OCLC 1036676119	Bego conducted personal interview with the singer and her close friends for the book. American academic and social critic Camille Paglia called it the "strongest of several [Madonna] biographies" in her book, Vamps and Tramps.	
The Madonna Connection	1993	Cathy Schwichtenberg	Westview Press	352	ISBN 978-0-813-31396-2	Compilation of essays about Madonna.	
Madonnarama: Essays on Sex and Popular Culture	1993	Lisa Frank; Paul Smith	Cleis Press	200	ISBN 978-0-939-41671-4	Margot Mifflin from Entertainment Weekly gave a positive review, saying that "with only minimal self-indulgence, Madonnarama smartly unravels [the singer's] tangled politics".	
Desperately Seeking Madonna: In Search of the Meaning of the World's Most Famous Woman	1993	Adam Sexton	Delta Publishing Inc	316	ISBN 978-0-385-30688-1; OCLC 843023870	Talks about Madonna's cultural impact and received positive review in Publishers Weekly.	
Madonna: The Early Days	1993	Michael MacKenzie	Worldwide Televideo Enterprise	95	ISBN 978-0-963-85193-2; OCLC 30361607	Picture book with 65 photographs of Madonna and her friends from her early days.	
I Dream of Madonna: Women's Dreams of the Goddess of Pop	1993	Kay Turner	HarperCollins	127	ISBN 978-0-002-55257-8; OCLC 679573080	Turner collected the dreams of 50 women about Madonna, accompanied by color collages. The book was described by Publishers Weekly as a Dada art project.	
Madonna Speaks	1993	Mike Fleiss	Tribune Publishers	122	ISBN 978-0-941-26383-2; OCLC 29211009	Book of Madonna quotations.	
Madonna Megastar: Photographs 1988–1993	1994	Camille Paglia	Schirmer Books	136	ISBN 978-3-888-14194-2; OCLC 69107469	Picture book with anecdotes by Paglia.	
Encyclopedia Madonnica	1995	Matthew Rettenmund	St. Martin's Griffin	207	ISBN 978-0-312-11782-5; OCLC 925163745	Compilation structured like an encyclopedia and touches every aspect of Madonna's life, from her music career to personal relationships, film roles and books. An updated version was released in 2015.	
Material Girls: Making Sense of Feminist Cultural Theory	1995	Suzanna Danuta Walters	University of California Press	221	ISBN 978-0-520-08978-5; OCLC 248867895	Focuses on Madonna, Murphy Brown and Thelma & Louise, with numerous case studies.	
Madonna: Her Story	1996	Michael MacKenzie	Music Sales Group	96	ISBN 978-0-711-91181-9; OCLC 242525360	The book starts with MacKenzie's favorite memory of Madonna.	
Guilty Pleasures: Feminist Camp from Mae West to Madonna	1996	Pamela Robertson	Duke University Press	208	ISBN 978-0-822-31748-7; OCLC 1022823955	Theoretical discussion of female performance and spectatorship.	
Madonna: Bawdy and Soul	1997	Karlene Faith	University of Toronto Press	226	ISBN 978-0-802-08063-9; OCLC 1011440319	Analysis of Madonna from a feminist perspective.	
Madonna: The Ultimate Compendium of Interviews, Articles, Facts and Opinions From the Files of Rolling Stone	1997	Barbara O'Dair	Hyperion Books	272	ISBN 978-0-786-88154-3; OCLC 906726278	Collection of articles till the release of Evita (1996).	
The Complete Guide to the Music of Madonna	1998	Rikky Rooksby	Omnibus Press	130	ISBN 978-0-711-96311-5; OCLC 473178131	The author analyzed every recorded song in Madonna's catalog. An updated edition was released in 2004.	
The Madonna Companion: Two Decades of Commentary	1999	Allan Metz; Carol Benson	Schirmer Books	312	ISBN 978-0-028-64972-6; OCLC 924775066	A collection of journalistic and academic writing on the singer.	

=== 2000s ===
Book title	Year	Author(s)	Publisher	Pages	Identifiers	Notes	Ref(s).
Madonna: An Intimate Biography	2001	J. Randy Taraborrelli	Simon & Schuster	416	ISBN 978-1-416-58346-2; OCLC 1036701525	The book received positive reviews from The Birmingham Post and London Evening Standard. There were other versions released in 2002, 2007, 2008 and 2018.	
Goddess: Inside Madonna	2001	Barbara Victor	HarperCollins	432	ISBN 978-0-060-19930-2; OCLC 50446330	Victor traveled to places inhabited by Madonna and interviewed the singer's close relatives, family members, friends and associates.	
Madonna: Queen of the World	2001	Douglas Thompson	John Blake Publishing	290	ISBN 978-1-904-03410-0; OCLC 473057768	Thompson interviewed Madonna's school friends and wrote about the singer's relationship with her father.	
Maximum Madonna: The Unauthorized Biography of Madonna	2001	Tim Footman	Chrome Dreams	8	ISBN 978-1-842-40012-8; OCLC 43669528	The audiobook was recorded at Echo Base, New Malden, Surrey and read by Laurel Lyko.	
Madonna	2002	Andrew Morton	St. Martin's Press	256	ISBN 978-1-854-79432-1; OCLC 49043729	Detailed about Madonna's ambitions, her relationships and her lifestyle. The author interviewed about 70 people who had known Madonna since her youth. The singer was critical of Morton contacting people about her life.	
Madonna as Postmodern Myth	2002	Georges Claude Guilbert	McFarland & Company	264	ISBN 978-0-786-41408-6; OCLC 907004351	Analysis of Madonna's cultural significance and the way she formed her fanbase throughout the world.	
Madonna Style	2002	Carol Clerk	Music Sales Group	175	ISBN 978-0-711-98874-3; OCLC 882730611	Included Madonna's most memorable moments, her sexuality exploration, her struggles with Catholicism and her concept of motherhood.	
Madonna in Art	2004	Mem Mehmet	Chaucer Press	192	ISBN 978-1-904-95700-3; OCLC 474920267	Pictures of the singer in art form by over a hundred artists, including Andrew Logan, Sebastian Krüger, Al Hirschfeld, and Peter Howson.	
Madonna's Drowned Worlds: New Approaches to Her Cultural Transformations	2004	Santiago Fouz-Hernández; Freya Jarman-Ivens	Ashgate Publishing	223	ISBN 978-0-754-63372-3; OCLC 999614528	Analysis of different topics like sexuality, ethnicity and celebrity culture through Madonna's work.	
Madonna: Inspirations	2005	Essential Works	Andrews McMeel Publishing	160	ISBN 978-0-825-67289-7; OCLC 941231650	Madonna's quotes and explanations about her work.	
Madonna: A Biography	2007	Mary Cross	Greenwood Publishing Group	152	ISBN 978-0-313-33811-3; OCLC 77575080	The biography was described by the New York Post as a "short, concise account" of Madonna.	
Madonna: Like an Icon	2007	Lucy O'Brien	Bantam Press	432	ISBN 978-0-060-89899-1; OCLC 226112145	Author gave detailed analysis of the singer's music, complete with interviews she conducted with the musicians and producers who had collaborated with Madonna on her albums.	
Madonna: Express Yourself	2007	Carol Gnojewski	Enslow Publishers	160	ISBN 978-0-766-02442-7; OCLC 71005751	The book concentrated on Madonna's early life prior to arriving in New York.	
A Girl Called Madonna	2007	Peter Robinson	The Friday Project Limited	48	ISBN 978-1-905-54881-1; OCLC 155689066	Biography told through cartoons illustrated by David Whittle.	
From Mae to Madonna: Women Entertainers in Twentieth-Century America	2008	June Sochen	University Press of Kentucky	256	ISBN 978-0-813-19199-7; OCLC 901100306	Author examined the historical impact of women in the entertainment industry and American culture, including mythological figures like Eve, Mary or Lillith.	
Life with My Sister Madonna	2008	Christopher Ciccone	Simon Spotlight Entertainment	352	ISBN 978-1-416-58762-0; OCLC 883801605	Biography by Madonna's brother, based on his life, growing up and working with his sister. It received negative reviews, with The Guardian calling it a "misery memoir".	
Madonna v Guy: The Inside Story of the Most Sensational Divorce in Showbiz	2009	Douglas Thompson	John Blake Publishing	288	ISBN 978-1-844-54791-3; OCLC 424607623	Chronicled Madonna's life with her second husband Guy Ritchie after they were married in 2000, till the circumstances that led to their divorce in 2008.	

=== 2010s ===
Book title	Year	Author(s)	Publisher	Pages	Identifiers	Notes	Ref(s).
Madonna: Entertainer	2010	Hal Marcovitz	Chelsea House Publications	125	ISBN 978-1-604-13859-7; OCLC 908389425	Biographical account till the release of Madonna's third greatest hits, Celebration.	
Are You My Guru?: How Medicine, Meditation & Madonna Saved My Life	2010	Wendy Shanker	New American Library	304	ISBN 978-0-451-22994-6; OCLC 883359217	Author wrote about how she was afflicted with a rare autoimmune disease, granulomatosis with polyangiitis, and how Madonna inspired her to not lose hope.	
Female Force: Madonna	2011	C.W. Cooke; Fred Grivaud	Bluewater Productions	32	ISBN 978-1-450-76678-4; OCLC 721823584	Comic book about Madonna's life.	
Not About Madonna: My Little Pre-Icon Roommate and Other Memoirs	2011	Whit Hill	Heliotrope Books	282	ISBN 978-0-983-29400-9; OCLC 759406306	Much of the book dealt with personal memories of the author and his friendship with Madonna when they were students at the University of Michigan.	
Madonna and Me: Women Writers on the Queen of Pop	2012	Laura Barcella; Jessica Valenti	Soft Skull Press	272	ISBN 978-1-593-76429-6; OCLC 779828857	Talked about the singer's influence and impact on the lives of over 40 women, and her role in the feminist movement.	
My Madonna: My Intimate Friendship with the Blue Eyed Girl on her Arrival in New York	2012	Norris W. Burroughs	Whimsy Literary Agency LLC	124	ISBN 978-0-988-41360-3; OCLC 920474568	Memoir about the author's relationship with Madonna when the latter was a 19 year old dancer living in New York City.	
Madonna: Biography of the World's Greatest Pop Singer	2012	Karen Lac	Hyperion Books	28	ISBN 978-1-614-64619-8; OCLC 968100386	Began with Madonna's response to a question by Dick Clark in 1984, to which the singer said she wanted to "rule the world". The biography expands on how Madonna achieved that statement.	
Cherish: Madonna, Like an Icon	2013	David Foy	Ivy Press	160	ISBN 978-1-908-00567-0; OCLC 938134877	A collection of more than 150 photographs.	
FAME: Madonna: A Graphic Novel	2013	C.W. Cooke	Bluewater Productions	40	ISBN 978-1-467-50268-9; OCLC 939614885	The release was part of the "Fame" comic book series.	
Madonna: Ambition. Music. Style	2014	Caroline Sullivan	Carlton Publishing Group	256	ISBN 978-1-780-97563-4; OCLC 883870187	Chronicled Madonna's career highs documented through images, and was released to commemorate the 30th anniversary of the singer's second studio album, Like a Virgin.	
The Mammoth Book of Madonna	2015	Michelle Morgan	Running Press Adult	512	ISBN 978-0-762-45621-5; OCLC 1023242304	Interviews, reviews and commentary about Madonna.	
Madonnaland	2016	Alina Simone	University of Texas Press	138	ISBN 978-0-292-75946-6; OCLC 990816619	Biographical account of the singer and the author's analysis of music and pop culture.	
Madonna: Nudes +	2017	Martin H. M. Schreiber	ACC Publishing Group	80	ISBN 978-1-851-49849-9; OCLC 988944134	Schreiber's nude images of Madonna had become famous when they were published in Playboy magazine in 1985. The book included unpublished images by him.	
The Madonna of Bolton	2018	Matt Cain	United Authors Publishing Ltd	416	ISBN 978-1-783-52618-5; OCLC 1013942370	Cain accumulated money for publishing the book through crowdfunding campaigns. The story follows protagonist Charlie Matthews, who falls in love with Madonna on his ninth birthday.	

=== 2020s ===
Book title	Year	Author(s)	Publisher	Pages	Identifiers	Notes	Ref(s).
Adore	2021	Kenji Wakasugi	NJG Studio	200	ISBN 978-1-9160718-2-7	Collection of previously unpublished photographs of Madonna taken by Kenji Wakasugi in Tokyo in 1985.	
Adore Volume 2	2021	Kenji Wakasugi	NJG Studio	200	ISBN 978-1-9160718-4-1	Second volume featuring additional photographs and contact sheets from Kenji Wakasugi's 1985 Tokyo session with Madonna.	
Madonna: Song by Song	2022	Marc Andrews	Fonthill Media	208	ISBN 978-1-78155-844-7	Song-by-song examination of Madonna's released recordings.	
Madonna: 1984	2023	Andrew Caulfield	NJG Studio	152	ISBN 978-1-9160718-6-5	Photographic collection by Andrew Caulfield documenting Madonna during the filming of her "Borderline" music video in Los Angeles in 1984.	
Madonna: A Rebel Life	2023	Mary Gabriel	Little, Brown & Company	880	ISBN 978-0-316-45647-0; OCLC 1401055687	Detailed biography exploring Madonna's artistic and cultural influence within the social and political context of her time.	
Madonna Songbook	2024	Giulio Mazzoleni	Antiga Edizioni	712	ISBN 978-88-8435-485-3	Song-by-song analysis of over 500 Madonna recordings, including released and unreleased songs, remixes, and live performances.	
Madonna: Amor	2024	Andrew Caulfield	NJG Studio	200	ISBN 978-1-9160718-7-2	Companion volume featuring additional unpublished photographs by Andrew Caulfield from the "Borderline" music video shoot.	
Madonna: Provoke	2025	Peter Anderson	NJG Studio	156	ISBN 978-1-9160718-8-9	Collection of previously unpublished photographs and contact sheets from Peter Anderson's 1983 portrait session with Madonna in London.	
Madonna: A Who HQ Illustrated Biography	2026	Francesco Sedita and Who HQ	Penguin Workshop	40	ISBN 979-8-2170-5355-1	Illustrated children's biography introducing Madonna's life and musical career to young readers.	
Madonna: All the Songs: The Story Behind Every Track	2026	Benoît Clerc	Cassell	624	ISBN 978-1-78840-634-5	Album-by-album and song-by-song examination of Madonna's recordings.	
Madonna: Into the Groove	2026	Ken Regan and Tomás Mier	Insight Editions	160	ISBN 979-8-3374-0478-3	Collection of Ken Regan's 1985 Madonna unpublished photographs, including the Mondrian photoshoot, with text by Tomás Mier.	

== Non-English books ==
Book title	Year	Author(s)	Publisher	Language	Pages	Identifiers	Notes	Ref(s).
Lady Madonna	1986	Guy Abitan; Danièle Abitan	Corlet	French	66	ISBN 978-2-864-18290-0; OCLC 469376599	—N/a	
Madonna	1987	Julia Edenhofer	Bastei Lübbe	German	204	ISBN 978-3-404-61113-3; OCLC 74953215	Explores her life and Madonna's re-invention of her image.	
Popdossier Madonna	1987	Alfred Bos; Tom Engelshoven; Stan Rijven	Loeb Uitgevers	Dutch	143	ISBN 978-9-062-13730-5; OCLC 64714088	—N/a	
Madonna	1989	Elia Perboni	Targa Italiana Editore	Italian	163	ISBN 978-8-871-11026-4; OCLC 23120568	Focused on criticism of Madonna's music.	
Das Madonna Phänomen	1993	Diedrich Diederichsen	KleinVerlag	German	117	ISBN 978-3-922-93009-9; OCLC 243734860	Focused on public opinion and popularity of the singer.	
Madonna	1993	Leo Tassoni	Icaria Editorial	Spanish	159	ISBN 978-8-474-26207-0; OCLC 806506635	—N/a	
Nainen populaarikulttuurissa: Madonna ja The immaculate collection	1994	Tuija Modinos	University of Jyväskylä	Finnish	124	ISBN 978-9-513-40277-8; OCLC 58126204	Criticism of Madonna and other women in popular culture.	
Madonna, érotisme et pouvoir	1994	Michel Dion; Jean Baudrillard	Éditions Kimé	French	132	ISBN 978-2-908-21294-5; OCLC 655141044	Authors focused on sex in popular culture and Madonna's influence.	
Madonnabilder: dekonstruktive Ästhetik in den Videobildern Madonnas	1995	Nicoläa Grigat	Peter Lang	German	120	ISBN 978-3-631-49074-7; OCLC 908128209	Talked about the singer's influences and aesthetics.	
Madonna: The Lady	1997	Lee McLaren; Virginie Gravier; Olivier Ragasol-Barbey	Éditions du Félin	French	249	ISBN 978-2-866-45267-4; OCLC 41132561	Relegated Madonna as a revolutionary and her complex personality.	
Madonna: de vele gezichten van een popster	1999	Hannah Bosma; Patricia Pisters	Prometheus Global Media	Dutch	204	ISBN 978-9-053-33699-1; OCLC 237360096	Focused on the singer as a feminist.	
Madonna: de stem van een generatie	2001	Kurt Jaspers; Gust de Meyer; Dirk Timmerman	Garant	Dutch	103	ISBN 978-9-044-11176-7; OCLC 902236056	Discussion about Madonna's cultural significance.	
Madonna	2005	Anne Bleuzen	K&B	French	144	ISBN 978-2-915-95703-7; OCLC 469946259	Included photos taken by Helmut Newton, Wayne Maser and Peter Lindbergh.	
Madonna: L'icône de la Pop	2006	Arnaud Babion-Collet	Éditions de la Lagune	French	192	ISBN 978-2-849-69011-6; OCLC 76949595	Author interviewed people who had worked with Madonna.	
Madonna	2006	Gianluigi Valerio	Coniglio Editore	Italian	145	ISBN 978-8-888-83398-9; OCLC 955589975	Book on Madonna's discography.	
Madonna on stage	2007	Frédéric Gillotteau	Editions Why not	French	287	ISBN 978-2-916-61106-8; OCLC 495362866	Included images of Madonna's concerts attended by the author.	
Madonna und wir : Bekenntnisse	2008	Kerstin Grether; Sandra Grether	Suhrkamp Verlag	German	399	ISBN 978-3-518-45992-8; OCLC 236327134	—N/a	
Madonna absolument!	2008	Erwan Chuberre	Alphée-J.-P	French	234	ISBN 978-2-753-80293-3; OCLC 227153304	Detailed about the singer's impact on different genres of music.	
Mad for Madonna. La regina del pop	2011	Francesco Falconi	Castelvecchi	Italian	115	ISBN 978-8-876-15550-5; OCLC 734056262	Author analyzed how Madonna had stayed contemporary in the music business through her image re-inventions.	
Madonah Ha-obesesiah Ha-Homo'it Ha-gedola Mi-Kulan	2019	Doron braunshtein	Lev Books	Hebrew	35	OCLC 1099908899	—N/a	

== Essays and other works ==
Book title	Year	Author(s)	Publisher	Pages	Identifiers	Notes	Ref(s).
Buscando a Madonna	1987	Enrique Medina	Editores Milton	200	ISBN 978-9-506-33007-1	A novel about a girl named Lucy, who dreamt of being like Madonna.	
The I Hate Madonna Handbook	1994	Ilene Rosenzweig	St. Martin's Press	210	ISBN 978-0-312-10481-8	Chronicled every negative aspect of Madonna's career. It was described by Rene Rosenzweig from People as "amusing".	
You Don't Know Madonna	2002	Jennifer Egan	Q	—	ISSN 0955-4955 issue 197	An essay of author's perception about Madonna that appeared in Q magazine, issue on December 15, 2002.	
Entrepreneurs on a dancefloor	2006	Jamie Anderson; Martin Kupp	Business Strategy Review	28–31	ISSN 1467-8616	An investigation about Madonna's enduring success since the perspective of strategic management, marketing and business.	
Madonna: Icon of Postmodernity	2008	Jock McGregor	L'Abri	1–8	ISSN 0836-0219	An essay of author's perception about Madonna since a Christian perspective.	
The Neuroscience of Madonna's Enduring Success	2008	Christopher Bergland	Psychology Today	—	ISSN 0033-3107	An article by Christopher Bergland which analyzed Madonna's enduring success since the perspective of neuroscience.	
Madonna: Who's That Girl	2010	Rodrigo Fresán	RIL Editores	343	ISBN 978-9-562-84782-7; OCLC 888244759	Essay compiled in the book Domadores de Historias. Conversaciones con grandes cronistas de América Latina. It spoke about Madonna being a classic symbol of Made in USA.	
Madonna's "Isaac"/Madonna's Akeda—A lesson for scholars, old and young	2015	David Blumenthal	The Immanent Frame	—	OCLC 1011401653	An essay online in which David Blumenthal discuss Madonna's song "Isaac" from her album Confessions on a Dance Floor.	
Justify Madonna? Star, fans et genre	2017	François Ribac	Téraèdre (HAL)	1–12	HAL 01672690	An article that analyzes Madonna and her fandom.	
