= Martin Schreiber =

Martin Schreiber may refer to:

- Martin E. Schreiber (1904–1997), Republican legislator and Milwaukee alderman
- Martin J. Schreiber (born 1939), his son, Democratic legislator and Governor of Wisconsin between 1977 and 79
- Martin H. M. Schreiber (born 1946), Czech-American photographer
