= Fragile (Madonna song) =

Song by Madonna

from the album Confessions II
- Released: July 3, 2026
- Studio: Start Here (London); Republic Studios (New York City)
- Genre: Drum and bass; 2-step garage
- Length: 4:19
- Label: Warner
- Songwriters: Madonna; Stuart Price
- Producers: Madonna; Stuart Price

"Fragile" is a song by American singer-songwriter Madonna from her fifteenth studio album, Confessions II (2026). A drum and bass and 2-step song based on an acoustic guitar and synth strings, its lyrics talk about Madonna's relationship with her brother, Christopher Ciccone, and his death from pancreatic cancer.

== Background and release ==
Madonna and her brother, Christopher Ciccone, had a very close relationship, both professionally and personally. Despite this, the two drifted apart for a few years, making peace shortly before Christopher's death in 2024. She revealed that she was working on new music with British producer Stuart Prince that same year, and in 2025, she revealed that she was developing a follow-up to her album Confessions on a Dance Floor (2005).

"Fragile" was one of the first songs on the album announced by Madonna, in a podcast interview on a episode of On Purpose with Jay Shetty. In the interview, she said: "there's things that have happened to me in my life that I just thought, 'I will never I will never forgive this person,' now I just don't want to have those feelings anymore 'cause it's a prison and it's poison to not be able to forgive and to live in a state of like holding a grudge or hating someone or wanting them to suffer." Madonna officially announced Confessions II on April 15, 2026, and its tracklist on May 14, revealing "Fragile" as the eleventh song on the tracklist for the standard edition and twelfth track on the deluxe edition. Warner Records released the song along with the rest of the album for digital download and streaming on July 3.

== Composition ==
"Fragile" was written and produced by Madonna and Stuart Price. It also features vocals from Madonna's daughters, Estere and Stella. The song is an ethereal, downbeat track that blends drum 'n' bass, 2-step, and UK garage elements. Musically, it is driven by an acoustic guitar-heavy arrangement and electronica breakbeats, featuring rhythmic skips alongside rave ballad sensibilities. Several critics drew sonic comparisons between its icy, atmospheric production and Madonna's 1998 album Ray of Light, specifically referencing the William Orbit-produced track "Frozen". The track opens with a spoken word intro in which Madonna reflects on mortality and existence: "People really think that there’s a beginning and an ending to this thing called life / Energy never dies, this is just a portal we’re going through / Still it’s hard to let go."

Lyrically, "Fragile" serves as a raw, emotional eulogy and homage to Madonna's late younger brother, Christopher Ciccone, who died of pancreatic cancer in 2024. The lyrics address their shared childhood, public estrangement following his 2008 tell-all memoir, and their ultimate reconciliation on his deathbed ("We shared a name, a home, we shared a fragile bond... I know you’re fragile, ‘cause you’ve been hurt, been let down"). In a dreamlike sequence, Madonna recounts a spiritual message ("Late last night I was fast asleep, you came to me in a dream... You said, ‘Don’t forget about me, don’t forget to be happy’") before concluding with a final wish for his peace: "So I hope you found a higher ground." Speaking on the song's inspiration during an interview with Graham Norton, Madonna revealed she wrote the track upstairs in her studio immediately after a phone call with her brother near the end of his life, describing the composition process as a cathartic "exorcism" and a promise "to find each other on the other side."

== Critical reception ==
Critics were very mixed about the song. Pitchfork described the song as "yearning" and "emotional". NME called the song a "lovely rave ballad". BBC called the song "delicate" and stated, "It's touching and poignant, but a clattering breakbeat is a distraction from the sentiment". Billboard criticized the track saying, "The vocal melody doesn’t quite get there, and the production feels meaningful but not entirely memorable". Far Out Magazine was very negative, saying it "should have been left on the cutting room floor".

== Credits and personnel ==
The credits are adapted from Madonna's website.

- Madonna – vocals, songwriting, producer
- Estere – featured vocals
- Stella – featured vocals
- Stuart Price – songwriting, producer, keyboards, guitar, drum programming, string arrangement, engineering, mixing
- Gloria Colston – assistant engineering
- Ruairi O'Flaherty – mastering
- Miles Showell – vinyl master cut

Recorded at Republic Studios (New York City) and Start Here (London). Mixed at Start Here (London). Mastered at Sterling Sound (Los Angeles). Vinyl master cut at Abbey Road Studios (London).

== Charts ==
=== Weekly charts ===
Weekly chart performance
Chart (2026)	Peak position
Ukraine Airplay (TopHit)	37

=== Monthly charts ===
Monthly chart performance
Chart (2026)	Peak position
Ukraine Airplay (TopHit)	55
