= I Dream of Madonna =

1993 book edited by Kay Turner

- First US edition cover
- Editor: Kay Turner
- Illustrator: Kay Turner and David Kolwyck
- Language: English
- Subject: Madonna, Dreams
- Genre: Anthology, Non-fiction
- Publisher: Collins Publishers San Francisco
- Publication date: 1993
- Media type: Print (hardcover)
- Pages: 128
- ISBN: 978-0-00-255257-8

I Dream of Madonna: Women's Dreams of the Goddess of Pop is a 1993 anthology of women's dreams about American singer Madonna, compiled and edited by American folklorist Kay Turner. It was published by Thames & Hudson in the United Kingdom and Collins Publishers San Francisco, a division of HarperCollins, in the United States. It contains 50 accounts of dreams experienced by women of different ages and backgrounds, accompanied by color collages created by Turner and artist David Kolwyck.

The project originated from a dream Turner had about Madonna in 1985 while studying folklore and women's religious traditions. She later collected similar experiences from other women, exploring the singer's influence on their identities, sexuality and personal desires. Turner also considered the book an unofficial response to Madonna's 1992 publication Sex. Following its release, the collection received mixed reviews, with critics discussing its portrayal of Madonna's relationship with female admirers and questioning some of Turner's interpretations.

== Summary ==
I Dream of Madonna presents 50 dreams about Madonna submitted by women, both fans and non-fans, between the ages of 13 and 61 from the United States, Canada, Britain and France. The dreamers describe encounters with the singer in various situations, portraying her as a friend, lover, sister, mother figure or someone in need of protection. The collection opens with "An Invitation to Dream", an introduction by Turner, in which she examines Madonna's cultural significance through feminist interpretations of sexuality, identity, desire and dream interpretation. Drawing on the writings of Sigmund Freud and other scholars, Turner explores how the singer's changing public image and artistic work may influence women's unconscious experiences. The dreams are identified in the table of contents by the opening words of each narration rather than conventional titles. The accounts are accompanied by more than 50 color collages combining photographs, religious imagery, popular culture and historical illustrations. The book concludes with acknowledgments on page 128.

== Background and writing ==
American scholar and musician Kay Turner developed an interest in women's religious traditions while studying folklore at the University of Texas at Austin. Her research included Mexican-American home altars and representations of the Virgin Mary. In 1984, she co-founded Texas Folklife Resources, and the following year became involved with the feminist punk rock band Girls in the Nose. In the spring of 1985, while researching folk Catholicism and feminist interpretations of the Virgin Mary, Turner had a dream about Madonna. She became interested in the singer's relationship with religious symbolism and female identity, later discovering that other women had similar dreams.

The author's interest in Madonna's music began after receiving recordings of "Everybody" and "Burning Up" from a former student living in New York. While performing with Girls in the Nose, she began sharing her dreams about the singer, prompting women in the audience to share their own experiences, which she began collecting informally around 1988 or 1989 and later preserved in an archive titled "Me and Madonna—Dreams". In late 1992, she met a British music critic after a band performance, who introduced the project to London publisher Thames & Hudson, which had been looking for a book about Madonna. After receiving an offer to publish the collection, the author spent approximately two months in early 1993 preparing the manuscript, gathering additional dreams from friends, concertgoers and members of a teenage Madonna fan club, while collaborating with artist David Kolwyck on the book's collages and traveling between Austin and New York during its production.

=== Introduction: An Invitation to Dream ===
In the book's introduction, "An Invitation to Dream", Turner examines why women dream about Madonna, relating the question to Sigmund Freud's theories of female desire. She observes that women often encounter the singer as a friend, sister, lover or maternal figure rather than a distant celebrity, interpreting these experiences through themes of companionship, sexuality and personal identity. While acknowledging that the dreams do not share a single meaning, the folklorist portrays Madonna as a contemporary goddess, drawing parallels with mythological and religious figures such as Aphrodite, Artemis, Athena and the Virgin Mary. She also explores the religious symbolism of the singer's name and her confirmation name, Veronica, which she associates with the idea of a "true image".

Recalling the feminist criticism Madonna faced in 1985, Turner argues that her expressions of sexuality challenged traditional religious and moral expectations. The author further examines the singer's ability to reinvent herself through different identities and control how she is perceived. Drawing on Freud's theories of narcissism, she interprets Madonna's changing personas as opportunities for women to explore their own identities. She also applies Jerry Aline Flieger's concept of the "Prodigal Daughter" to Madonna, portraying her as a woman who challenges paternal authority to establish her independence. The introduction also explores oneiric imagery and fantasy in Madonna's music videos, including "Lucky Star", "Like a Virgin", "Like a Prayer", "Express Yourself", "Cherish", "Justify My Love" and "Erotica".

Turner interprets the singer's recurring message that dreams can come true as an invitation to personal freedom and self-discovery, while identifying water as a recurring symbol of sexuality, birth and transformation in the collected dreams. For the collection, she edited the dream narratives minimally. Although Turner began collecting women's dreams around 1988 or 1989, she considered the anthology's publication an unofficial response to Madonna's Sex book (1992), interpreting the women's accounts as the other half of a dialogue about dreams, fantasies and desires that the singer had explored throughout her career. The folklorist concludes that Madonna represents the possibility of personal transformation and female empowerment, connecting her cultural influence with the feminist and gay liberation movements.

== Publication and release ==
I Dream of Madonna was published in 1993 by Thames & Hudson in the United Kingdom and Collins Publishers San Francisco, a division of HarperCollins, in the United States. The American hardcover edition contains 128 numbered pages and was printed in Slovenia. The book features original graphics by Kay Turner and David Kolwyck, with photographs, historical illustrations and other visual materials credited to several contributors. Publishers Weekly reported an initial printing of 35,000 copies for the American edition.

The anthology was released during the period of Madonna's Girlie Show concert tour. Turner later recalled that Thames & Hudson had arranged the publication to coincide with the tour and promoted the book during its international dates. She also stated that she requested Madonna's approval before publication, and that the singer received the proofs and expressed appreciation for the work through Turner's publicist. According to Turner, Madonna subsequently purchased approximately 30 copies to distribute among members of her team.

== Critical response ==
The book received mixed reviews from contemporary critics. Publishers Weekly compared the collection to a Dada art object, highlighting its unusual combination of women's dreams and surrealist collages. The reviewer noted that many participants imagined Madonna as a supportive friend or sister, but criticized the book's emphasis on the singer's sexual self-centeredness, which the publication considered exaggerated. A review published in the South China Morning Post on September 26, 1993, criticized many of the dreams as ordinary and questioned Turner's interpretations, describing her introductory essay as too brief and selective. Nevertheless, the reviewer found the dream narratives entertaining and praised the humor of some of the accompanying collages.

Ben Thompson of The Independent offered a more favorable assessment, praising the book for presenting Madonna through the experiences of other women rather than through conventional celebrity biography. He considered the dreams engaging and believed they revealed the complexities of female fandom, although he questioned Turner's interpretation of Madonna primarily as a sisterly companion, observing that the dreamers remained aware of her celebrity status. In a 2001 review of Andrew Morton's biography Madonna for The Observer, Barbara Ellen described I Dream of Madonna as an unusual and appealing book, contrasting its approach with that of more conventional biographies of the singer.

== Publication history ==
Region	Release date	Publisher	Format	ISBN	Ref.
United States	September 1993	Collins Publishers San Francisco	Hardcover	ISBN 978-0-00-255257-8	
United Kingdom	September 20, 1993	Thames & Hudson	Hardcover	ISBN 978-0-500-01595-7	
