= Madonna: A Rebel Life =

2023 biography of Madonna by Mary Gabriel

- Book cover (US)
- Author: Mary Gabriel
- Language: English
- Subject: Madonna
- Genre: Biography
- Publisher: Little, Brown and Company (United States); Coronet (United Kingdom)
- Publication date: October 10, 2023
- Media type: Print (hardcover and paperback), e-book, audiobook
- Pages: 880 (US hardcover)
- ISBN: 978-0-316-45647-0

Madonna: A Rebel Life is a 2023 biography of American singer Madonna by journalist and biographer Mary Gabriel. It was published on October 10, 2023, by Little, Brown and Company in the United States and Coronet in the United Kingdom. The book examines Madonna's life and career in the context of contemporary American social and cultural history, including feminism, religion, sexual politics, the HIV/AIDS epidemic and LGBTQ rights.

Gabriel spent approximately five years researching the biography. Although she attempted to interview Madonna, the singer did not participate directly. Gabriel drew on archival accounts of Madonna's life and career as well as interviews with associates and collaborators, approaching the subject as a historical figure rather than a celebrity. Reviewers praised its research and historical scope, while others questioned its length, interpretive approach, or relative lack of attention to the practical making of Madonna's music.

== Summary ==
The biography chronicles Madonna's life from her childhood in Michigan and her move to New York City to pursue dance to her rise as an internationally recognized recording artist. It traces her music, films, concert tours, personal relationships, artistic collaborations, and public controversies, placing these events within the social and cultural history of the period to explore how Madonna was shaped by the world around her and how she, in turn, influenced society through her work and celebrity. The book is divided into 62 chapters across six chronological parts named after places where Madonna lived during different periods of her life: Michigan, New York, Los Angeles, Miami, London, and Lisbon. Individual chapters are titled after the locations where their events take place, regardless of Madonna's place of residence. The chronological narrative extends through 2020. The biography opens with a prologue depicting Madonna's November 28, 2000, performance at London's Brixton Academy and concludes with an epilogue.

== Background and development ==
American journalist and biographer Mary Gabriel developed the idea for Madonna: A Rebel Life while considering a new subject through which to continue her exploration of women artists and their influence on society. Her previous book, Ninth Street Women (2018), had examined five female painters associated with the Abstract Expressionist movement in mid-twentieth-century New York. Although Gabriel wished to continue writing about women in the arts, she feared that another book about painters or sculptors would repeat themes she had already explored. She also wanted to examine a different artistic medium and move her historical focus closer to the present.

Gabriel initially did not consider herself a fan. Nevertheless, she had been aware of the performer's appeal since the 1980s, particularly through colleagues in journalism. While working for United Press International, Gabriel recalled a fellow reporter who attended Madonna's The Virgin Tour (1985) with her younger sister. Although both journalists had initially regarded the concert as entertainment intended primarily for adolescents, the colleague returned impressed by Madonna's performance and subsequently became an admirer. Gabriel found the incident memorable because the reporter had covered the Middle East and was an experienced journalist. During her subsequent career, Gabriel encountered other respected female correspondents who attended Madonna's concerts, further drawing her attention to the artist's appeal.

Her interest in Madonna changed substantially after hearing the singers's acceptance speech at the 2016 Billboard Women in Music ceremony, where Madonna was honored as Woman of the Year. Delivered shortly after the 2016 United States presidential election, the speech addressed sexism, misogyny, and the difficulties faced by women in the entertainment industry. Gabriel later explained that it challenged her previous perception of Madonna as a commercially motivated pop star whose controversies were intended to attract publicity. Gabriel began researching the artist's career and listening to her music. She found that the previously published biographies did not adequately address what she considered Madonna's significance as a political and cultural figure. Within several months, Gabriel had decided to make Madonna the subject of her next biography.

The biography was announced in February 2019 under the original title Madonna Risen: A Feminist Tale, with Gabriel intending to examine Madonna's influence on modern feminism and her opposition to discrimination, but was later retitled Madonna: A Rebel Life, reflecting the author's research into how Madonna challenged the status quo and advocated for marginalized groups.

=== Research and writing ===
"I don’t think anybody can honestly examine her life and not come out a fan. There may have been moments you might disagree with, but my god, what a powerful woman. When you look at our time and ask, “Who has had a bigger global impact?” I think you’d be hard-pressed to come up with three other artists who did."

— Mary Gabriel on writing about Madonna's life

Unlike the subjects of Gabriel's previous biographies, Madonna was still alive when the project began. Gabriel initially regarded the possibility of directly interviewing her subject as an advantage of writing about a contemporary figure. Drawing on her experience as a journalist, Gabriel spent five years attempting to interview Madonna and contact members of her inner circle through successive publicists. Her inability to secure their participation led her to question whether she could complete the biography. She ultimately chose to treat Madonna as a historical subject, employing the research methods she had developed for her earlier biographies.

Gabriel interviewed several people who had known or worked with Madonna, including her brother Christopher Ciccone, university friends Whit Hill and Linda Alaniz, photographer Marcus Leatherdale, actor Lawrence Monoson, and Catherine Underhill, who provided insights into her early life, artistic relationships, and the impact of the HIV/AIDS epidemic on her social circle. Other interviewees included dancers Kevin Stea and Carlton Wilborn, singers Niki Haris and Donna De Lory, and Brian Antoni and Tom Austin, who discussed different periods of Madonna's career and her involvement in the cultural scene of Miami Beach. She later explained that access to people within Madonna's professional circle became increasingly difficult when researching later periods of her career. To supplement her interviews, she consulted hundreds of previously published conversations with the artist and her collaborators, including material from Madonna fan publications.

Rather than concentrating on Madonna's celebrity status and controversies, Gabriel sought to examine her as an artist and political figure, arguing that some earlier biographies had overlooked the singer's significance as a force for social change. Gabriel described her method as a horizontal approach to biography, examining how people and historical events influenced Madonna and how her work, in turn, affected society. She aimed to preserve the voices of Madonna and those who knew her, using quotations from specific periods to illustrate how their perspectives changed over time. Gabriel also explained that she found it difficult to decide where the biography should end because Madonna was still alive and working.

== Publication and release ==
Madonna: A Rebel Life was published on October 10, 2023, by Little, Brown and Company, part of Hachette Book Group, in the United States, and Coronet, an imprint of Hodder & Stoughton, in the United Kingdom. Both hardcover editions contain 880 pages, although they differ in physical dimensions: the American edition measures approximately 246 × 173 × 46 mm, while the British edition measures 241 × 163 × 60 mm. The biography was also released in e-book and audiobook formats.

The book was also published in several languages, including Swedish by Bokförlaget Atlas, Hungarian by HVG Könyvek, and Italian by Rizzoli Lizard in 2023. A Brazilian Portuguese edition followed on April 22, 2024, through BestSeller, an imprint of Grupo Editorial Record, while the Polish edition was released by Znak Koncept on July 17, 2024, featuring a different cover design from the original American edition.

In December 2023, following the book's publication, Madonna's team invited Gabriel to attend a New York performance of The Celebration Tour. Although she was unable to participate due to promotional commitments for the biography, Gabriel interpreted the invitation as a possible sign of approval from Madonna's team. She later attended the tour's Minnesota concert in February 2024.

== Critical reception ==
Critics frequently highlighted the extensive historical research and broad scope of Madonna: A Rebel Life, although they differed over whether Gabriel's sympathetic interpretation of Madonna strengthened or limited the biography. Fiona Sturges of The Guardian described the book favorably and praised its treatment of Madonna as a cultural figure rather than merely a celebrity. Sturges commended Gabriel's ability to connect the singer's work with larger political and artistic developments. Jenn Pelly, writing in The Washington Post, similarly praised the reconstruction of the singer's early New York milieu and the wider political and artistic currents informing her career, while observing that the biography gave relatively less sustained attention to musical technique.

Marc Weingarten of the Los Angeles Times found the material about Madonna's early life and early career particularly effective, but considered sections dealing with later recordings, tours and professional developments less engaging. In The New Yorker, Michelle Orange praised the diligence of Gabriel's compilation but questioned the limitations of its interviewing and its account of the actual creative processes behind Madonna's work. Publishers Weekly reviewed the biography favorably, highlighting the scale of Gabriel's research and the exploration of Madonna's artistic ambition and engagement with social controversies. Kirkus Reviews also gave a favorable assessment, emphasizing the breadth of the chronological narrative and the book's attention to Madonna's place in popular culture. Hamilton Cain, writing for the Star Tribune, commended the depth of the biography's research but regarded its treatment of Madonna as excessively reverential. Joanna Biggs assessed Gabriel's biography in a later essay in The New York Review of Books, discussing Madonna's cultural legacy alongside the book's approach to her life and work.

== Accolades ==
The Guardian included Madonna: A Rebel Life in its selection of the best memoirs and biographies of 2023. The publisher has additionally described the book as a New York Times Editors' Choice and an NPR Best Book of the Year. In 2024, the book was a finalist for the PEN/Jacqueline Bograd Weld Award for Biography.

== Publication history ==
Region	Language	Release date	Publisher	Format	ISBN	Ref.
United States	English	October 10, 2023	Little, Brown and Company	Hardcover	978-0-316-45647-0	
United Kingdom	English	October 10, 2023	Coronet	Hardcover	978-1-5293-3200-1	
Sweden	Swedish	2023	Bokförlaget Atlas	Hardcover	978-91-7445-064-4	
Hungary	Hungarian	November 10, 2023	HVG Könyvek	Hardcover	978-963-565-355-3	
Italy	Italian	November 14, 2023	Rizzoli Lizard	Hardcover	978-88-17-18206-5	
Brazil	Portuguese	April 22, 2024	BestSeller	Paperback	978-65-5712-341-6	
Poland	Polish	July 17, 2024	Znak Koncept	Hardcover	978-83-240-9426-4	
Poland	Polish	August 16, 2024	Znak Koncept	E-book	978-83-240-9546-9	
