= Wessel + O'Connor Fine Art =

Contemporary art gallery in the United States

Coordinates: 40.36766°N 75.08841°W

- Company type: Art gallery
- Industry: Art market
- Founded: October 12, 1985
- Founders: John Wessel; William "Billy" C. O’Connor
- Headquarters: Lahaska, Pennsylvania
- Area served: New York City, Bucks County
- Key people: William C. O’Connor (Owner)
- Website: wesseloconnor.com

Wessel + O'Connor Fine Art, sometimes styled Wessel O'Connor is an art gallery that began in Rome in 1985, which was known for providing East Village artists with their first European exhibits. Jointly owned by John Wessel (1941–2011) and William C. O’Connor, the gallery subsequently operated in locations in: Tribeca, SoHo, Chelsea, Dumbo, Lambertville, New Jersey, and Doylestown, Pennsylvania. As of December 2017, it is located in Lahaska, Pennsylvania.

In their early years, they were known for being one of the few gay art galleries.

While at its SoHo location, the gallery became known for its queer identity art. Among the artists it showed was Christopher Ciccone, Madonna's brother.
