= Life with My Sister Madonna =

Book by Christopher Ciccone

- First edition book cover
- Author: Christopher Ciccone; Wendy Leigh
- Cover artist: Linda Dingler
- Genre: Biography; memoir
- Published: July 14, 2008
- Publisher: Simon Spotlight Entertainment
- Publication place: United States
- Pages: 352
- ISBN: 978-1-4165-8762-0
- OCLC: 883801605
- Dewey Decimal: 782.42166092 B
- LC Class: ML420.M1387

Life with My Sister Madonna is an autobiography by American artist, designer and interior decorator Christopher Ciccone and author Wendy Leigh. The book is a memoir and tell-all book about Ciccone's life, with heavy focus on his relationship with his sister, the American singer-songwriter and actress Madonna, and was released on July 14, 2008, by Simon Spotlight Entertainment. It details Ciccone's life spent with Madonna, as well as unknown aspects of the singer's life. The relationship between Ciccone and his sister had deteriorated over the years following the singer's refusal to employ him as her tour director. Writing the book was considered "cathartic" for Ciccone, and he contacted Leigh, a biographer, for help and advice. Together they developed the project secretly and offered it to Simon Spotlight Entertainment for publication.

Madonna, who was not aware of the release, was annoyed by it but failed to stop its publication. Simon Spotlight Entertainment sold the book blindly to the retailers, with the expectation that it would create a media uproar for the contents and the nature of the memoir. Life with My Sister Madonna received negative reviews from book critics. Reviewers panned the content and felt it ironic that Ciccone would use his sister's name to cash in while at the same time trashing her. They also felt that the book revealed nothing noteworthy or not already common knowledge. Commercially, the book debuted at number two on The New York Times Best Seller list, and went on to sell 35,000 copies.

== Synopsis ==
The memoir recounts different incarnations of Madonna's life such as "Spoiled Daddy's Girl", "The Punk Drummer", "The Raunchy Boy Toy", "Material Girl", "Mrs. Sean Penn", "Warren Beatty's Glamorous Hollywood Paramour", "Loving Mother", "Mrs. Guy Ritchie" and "English Grande Dame".

The biography starts with the opening night of Madonna's The Girlie Show World Tour (1993) in London. From there, it describes Ciccone and Madonna's childhood together, playing at their father's orchards, the death of their mother. Ciccone reflects on working with Madonna, starting as a dancer for the music video for her 1983 single, "Lucky Star", to the Girlie Show in 1993. He writes about Madonna's sex life, including her relationships with artist Jean-Michel Basquiat, actors Sean Penn and Warren Beatty, and director Guy Ritchie, alleging that the lattermost is homophobic.

Ciccone narrates the early part of his life with Madonna, including his first joint and his first visit to a gay bar. He also recalls Madonna's performance in school donning a provocative costume that displeased their father. Then he debunks Madonna's story regarding her first trip to Manhattan with nothing but $35 in her pocket and a pair of ballet shoes. The book ends with an epilogue listing the singer's accomplishments and Ciccone's current life, as well as an afterword, where he detailed how Madonna supposedly wanted to stop the publishing of the book and previously unreleased family photographs.

== Background and publication ==
Christopher Ciccone was the fifth child of Silvio Anthony "Tony" Ciccone and Madonna Louise (née Fortin), two years younger than Madonna. He began his career and worked as the singer's assistant, concert tour and art director. He also worked on the singer's 1991 documentary Madonna: Truth or Dare. In June 2008, Simon & Schuster revealed that Christopher Ciccone had written a memoir on her, titled Life with My Sister Madonna. The publisher described the book as based "on his life and 47 years of growing up with and working with his sister". Ciccone wrote the book with author Wendy Leigh, who had previously written biographies of John F. Kennedy Jr., Prince Edward, and Liza Minnelli, and ghostwrote Zsa Zsa Gabor's autobiography.

"I could have written that book, the book about how horrifying she is or can be, but I didn't write that book. I was just looking for a little recognition for the work I've done for 20 years with her, that it wasn't one person."

— Christopher Ciccone about the book's content

Prior to the release of the book, the relationship between Madonna and Ciccone had deteriorated from 2001 onwards, when Madonna refused to employ him as her tour director for the Drowned World Tour. "From the moment I found out that I wasn't doing Drowned World, to her and Guy's wedding, everything became a bit of a blur, a dark, fairly negative period of time for me," he felt. According to Ciccone, he took therapy but faced difficulty in living life separately from his sister. He believed that being under the shadow of Madonna had never allowed him to achieve an identity of his own. Ciccone explained to Chrissy Iley from the Irish Independent that Madonna had often tried manipulating him into working for free and forced him to perform tasks that he did not want. However, the relationship completely ended when Madonna accused him of theft from her in an email, "of swindling her after 20 years of being the only person that hadn't". Believing that the book was not just a catharsis for him, the author wrote it feeling that it would also empower him. Ciccone described writing the book as "a giant fucking orgasm. Therapy I already had; this was pure sex".

Wendy Leigh explained that the project started when Ciccone had approached her in 2007 for writing a memoir. He showed her a cache of letters from Madonna, where the singer detailed about her marriage to Ritchie, and evident problems they were facing. Feeling that "It showed a side of [Madonna] that made her very human", Leigh decided to write the memoir. Ciccone would secretly arrive at Leigh's home in Key Biscayne, Florida, donning disguises (with the name Mr. Blake) lest anyone found about the project. An auction was held among numerous publication houses, and Simon Spotlight Entertainment finally accepted to release the book. The initial title was, The Queen and I, but the editors thought that it sounded "snarky" and changed it to Life with My Sister Madonna. The singer did not find out about the book being published until Ciccone had asked their father for family pictures. She immediately emailed Ciccone to call her, which he refused to do. Back-and-forth conversations took place which escalated to the point where Madonna's legal representatives tried to stop the book being published. Simon Spotlight Entertainment sold the book "blind" to the retailers, without disclosing the book title or subject matter, in the expectation that it would create a media uproar for the contents and the nature of the memoir.

== Critical response ==
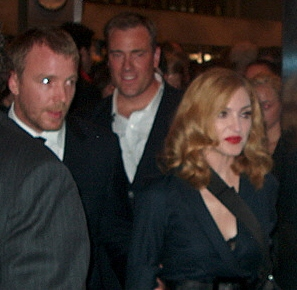
Madonna with Guy Ritchie (pictured in 2005). Ciccone labeled Ritchie a homophobe in the book.

Life with My Sister Madonna received mostly negative reviews from book critics. Barbara Ellen from The Observer called it Ciccone's "missed opportunity" at writing a "misery memoir", feeling a better title for the book would have been "Sissie Dearest". She believed that Ciccone could have gone all the way in writing about details that no one knew, but instead chose to reflect unsuccessfully on his relationship with Madonna. Ellen ended the review saying that she felt the book was "an overlong, unintentionally hilarious essay on one brother's obsessive envy and resentment of his flawed but talented famous sister". John Crace from The Guardian parodied Ciccone and Leigh's writing style, suggesting Ciccone said he had "no sense of self and even less insight, that's totally beyond me. So I've settled for bitching about that mediocre diva whom I adore really". Writing for The Daily Telegraph, John Preston noted that the failure of the book was Ciccone's inability to move past his obsession with Madonna, which resulted in the writing being insincere. Preston added: "Is it all true? It sounds plausible enough—all apart from one thunderous piece of self-delusion. 'Any bitterness I had once felt for my sister has long since evaporated,' [Ciccone] writes in conclusion. I don't think so. Percolated maybe, fermented certainly, but evaporated – never." A similar review was written by Lee Randall from The Scotsman who added that "while this book is nothing if not self-serving, Ciccone does stop and examine his own ignoble behaviour and motives."

Alex Altman from Time noted that the memoir was focused less on Madonna but rather on Ciccone's life, self-described as the singer's "doormat". Altman found that ultimately the publication was relegated to offering "a peek at a man still grappling with his sister's dizzying fame". Giles Hattersley from The Times commended Ciccone's desire to release a tell-all memoir, but believed that he failed, since the majority of the book showed bitterness at never being better than Madonna. Nathan Rabin from The A.V. Club found the book to follow the general theme of tell-all releases by someone bitter with Ciccone laying "out the case against his sister in a prosecutorial fashion", while involving their dead mother at any chance he got. Rabin panned the book saying that Ciccone implied their mother would be "horrified at Madonna's debauchery, but would feel proud her gay son wrote a book that prominently features him snorting cocaine with various super-celebrities". Susanah Cahalan from the New York Post was mixed in her review, pointing out the highlight of the book as when Ciccone described the enmity he felt for Madonna's husband Guy Ritchie, by painting him as a homophobe. She noted that by the end, the writing became more melancholic.

An article in New York felt that Ciccone would profit from the book's sales, by including the same content that was already known about the singer. Nicholas Fonseca from Entertainment Weekly gave the book a rating of C+, and felt that although the book had some "surreally humorous life-in-a-bubble moments", it was counterbalanced by the authors' attempt to "psychoanalyze" Madonna, "a ludicrous exercise given that she is already the most overexposed woman of her generation". Molly Friedman believed that Life with My Sister Madonna only helped to enhance Madonna's reputation as a "bad girl", which was missing from the singer's repertoire for a long time. Friedman found that the so-called revelations promised by Ciccone in the book appeared to be quite tame compared to the contemporary celebrity culture observed.

== Sales and aftermath ==
With an initial print run of 350,000 copies, the memoir went on to sell 35,000 copies according to Nielsen BookScan. It debuted at number two on The New York Times Best Seller list dropping to number seven by its third week. In the United Kingdom it reached the top of the best-selling book charts. Following the release, Madonna's representative Liz Rosenberg told the Associated Press that the singer was upset that Ciccone released a book based on her life, and so chose not to read it. Rosenberg clarified that Madonna realized her relationship with Ciccone was damaged irreparably, and that the release of the book ended any chance of the siblings ever reconciling. Ritchie also commented regarding accusations by Ciccone about him being a homophobe, saying: "I don't make anything of the book. The poor chap wrote it out of desperation. I don't think it'd be intelligent to comment on that. I can't give too much equity in what the chap's gonna write in that book. But you'd be hard pushed to be a homophobe and marry Madonna."

By 2012, the siblings ultimately settled their differences. On October 4, 2024, Ciccone died just two weeks after the death of their stepmother Joan. On October 6, Madonna dedicated a lengthy Instagram post to him saying, "I admired him [...] We found our way back to each other. I did my best to keep him alive as long as possible. He was in so much pain towards the end [...] There will never be anyone like him". Her 2026 album Confessions II includes the song "Fragile", which serves as a raw, emotional eulogy and homage to Ciccone, with lyrics addressing their shared childhood, public estrangement following the book's release, and their ultimate reconciliation on his deathbed.

== Publication history ==
Region	Language	Release date	Publisher	Format	ISBN	Ref.
United States	English	July 14, 2008	Simon Spotlight Entertainment	Hardcover	978-1-4165-8762-0	
United States	English	July 14, 2008	Gallery Books	E-book	978-1-4391-0926-7	
United States	English	July 14, 2008	Simon & Schuster Audio	Audiobook	978-0-7435-8005-2	
United States	English	March 3, 2009	Gallery Books	Paperback	978-1-4165-8763-7	
United Kingdom	English	July 2008	Simon & Schuster	Hardcover	978-1-84737-438-7	
United Kingdom	English	December 9, 2008	Simon & Schuster UK	E-book	978-1-84737-595-7	
United Kingdom	English	2009	Pocket Books	Paperback	978-1-84739-636-5	
Australia	English	July 15, 2008	Simon & Schuster Australia	Paperback	978-1-921470-08-0	
France	French	September 2008	Éditions du Toucan	Paperback	978-2-8100-0215-3	
Brazil	Portuguese	2008	Planeta do Brasil	Paperback	978-85-7665-125-3	
Sweden	Swedish	November 7, 2008	Norstedts	Hardcover	978-91-505-0057-8	
Sweden	Swedish	April 14, 2009	Norstedts	Paperback	978-91-505-0080-6	
Italy	Italian	2008	Rizzoli	Hardcover	978-88-17-02784-7	
Germany	German	2008	Schwarzkopf & Schwarzkopf	Hardcover	978-3-89602-867-9	
Czech Republic	Czech	2008	Baronet	Hardcover	978-80-7384-172-0	
Netherlands	Dutch	February 2009	Meulenhoff Boekerij	Paperback	978-90-492-0052-7	
Spain	Spanish	April 2, 2009	Libros Cúpula	Hardcover	978-84-480-4848-8	
Russia	Russian	2009	Eksmo	Hardcover	978-5-699-32932-8	
Finland	Finnish	2011	Helsinki-kirjat	Hardcover	978-952-5874-81-5	
