= Michael McKenzie (artist) =

American artist and writer (born 1953)

- Self portrait of Michael McKenzie taken in 1985
- Born: 1950 (age 75–76); New York, United States
- Occupations: Author artist Curator publisher
- Writing career
- Notable work: New, Used and Improved: Art for the Eighties (1985)

Michael McKenzie (born 1950 in New York, United States) is an American artist and writer. His mother a fourth generation Irish/German and his father of recent Scottish immigrants.

He began writing, drawing, painting and publishing at a young age and later studied creative writing at Middlebury College, Columbia, The New School and Brooklyn College under multiple Pulitzer Prize Winners. While in school he founded the literary & art magazine Undine.

Through the late-70s and 80s, he worked with many globally recognized celebrities and brands including Andy Warhol, Coca-Cola, and Saturday Night Live.

== Education ==
McKenzie studied under Mark Strand, Charles Simic, Anthony Hecht, John Gardner, John Ashbery. He took his MFA under John Ashbery.

He studied journalism mainly under Harvey Shapiro and Truman Capote who encouraged him to pursue that artform "because if you want to know what great artists are really like they can fool you with media stories and awards but not with their eyes".

To that end he interviewed and/or photographed a wide portfolio of artists who interested him including Capote, Williams, Albee, Warhol, Rivers, Nureyev, Lou Reed, The Ramones, Blondie, Madonna; such leading sports figures as Ali, Jordan and Namath and a wide scope of comedians including Carlin, Klein, Murray, Belushi, Radner, Joan Rivers, and Phyllis Diller.

== Career ==
He paid his way through college and grad school as a portrait photographer and added silkscreening when he worked on a portrait project with Andy Warhol who introduced him to that print making/painting form.

While in school he founded the literary & art magazine Undine with a board of directors that included NY Times Executive Editor Harvey Shapiro, Larry Rivers and Tennessee Williams. On the advice of comedian George Carlin who he had interviewed and photographed, wrote his first book and the first on the television show Saturday Night Live! while still in school. He followed that up with successful titles on Madonna ["Lucky Star" Contemporary/MacMillan Books] and "Billy Joel: Piano Man" [Ballantine Books], the first books on both of those artists. Collectively, his titles have sold over 1,000,000 copies and been published on five continents in 12 languages.

== Art ==
McKenzie's clients included Time Inc, Rolling Stone, Sony, Playboy, Flemington Furs, Halston, Random House, Putnam Books, Ballantine Books, Scholastic, Stern, Der Spiegel, Scholastic, Harpers Bazaar, Coca-Cola, Nike, NBC, CBS, Paris Match and numerous other corporate, advertising, book and periodical clients. His studio was constantly working and, like one of his influences, Andy Warhol, there was no separation between his art and his commercial work. In 1978 he was named "Upcoming Photographer of the Year" by Art Direction Magazine. For several years he oil painted photographs and in 1978, when he met and worked with Warhol, realized that Andy's silkscreen technique converting photography to painting was what he was after. From 1977 – 1985 McKenzie had over 20 one man shows on four continents. In 1979 he curated the notorious 'Punk Art Show' which featured his portraits of Sid Vicious, Joey Ramone and Blondie and included original works by Joey Ramone, Chris Stein, Arturo Vega and John Holmstrom, founder of Punk Magazine. In 1981/83 he created a portfolio called 'Androgyny' which included early portraits of the then Androgynous Madonna as well as downtown performers John Sex, Bush Tetras and Michael Alago. He decided to 'make the portfolio come alive' and created a Kurt Weill-like cabaret act with the people from the portfolio. Titled 'Androgyny Cabaret' it played in numerous downtown NYC venues and was the subject of a two-hour documentary by the BBC which included a live guest appearance by members of the Clash.

By 1987 his silkscreen works attracted the attention of other artists and he began publishing works by numerous important painters using silkscreen techniques he mastered over the course of a decade. From this, American Image, his studio was born. He continued to show his portraits mainly in NY, Miami and Asia and is currently working on a book of his portraits and stories titled MAD GENIUSES: ANDY WARHOL AND HIS CIRCLE.

== Publishing ==
McKenzie founded American Image Art in 1977 with photography and painting but after ten years of working in silkscreen, often with Andy Worhol.

McKenzie also curated the show that helped move Miami's Bass Museum into contemporary in 1988 as well as important shows for The Nassau County Museum, Norton Museum, Boca Raton Museum and The Detroit Jewish Museum. He is currently working on a major book/travelling exhibition of WORD ART to include Indiana, Ruscha, Kruger and numerous others. “Again”, he stated, “I just see a cultural hole ignoring this as a critical movement in art which no one seems to fill in. It’s a link between poetry and art and these two creative forms have always been central to art history and to my life, so I’m lured into curating once again.”

Over the course of 35 plus years American Image has published a Who's Who of American Contemporary art including Warhol, Wesselman, Indiana, Oldenburg, Lichtenstein, D’Arcangelo, Katz, Sultan, Haring, Cutrone, Rivers, Paschke, Bell, Borofsky, Stella and recent works with what he calls Urban Pop: Crash, English, AIko, Eaton and Witz. In 2007 the studio embarked on a worldwide project with Pop Artist Robert Indiana to follow up his masterpiece LOVE with THE word for the new millennium. Indiana chose HOPE and it became a seminal part of Barack Obama's Presidential campaign, ultimately raising 7 figures as well as consciousness and votes. In 2010, The Today Show featured the story on HOPE declaring HOPE THE word for the next generation. A travelling museum show of the works created by the studio with Indiana opened in Fall 2013 at The Munson Williams Proctor Museum, where Indiana first studied Art, and will travel through 2016 toured by Landau Travelling Exhibitions.

== Lawsuit ==
In May 2018, Morgan Art Foundation (MAF) filed a lawsuit in the United States District Court for the Southern District of New York concerning rights relating to the intellectual property and artistic legacy of Robert Indiana. The action named art publisher Michael McKenzie and American Image Art, among others, and included claims for copyright and trademark infringement and tortious interference with contracts between Indiana and MAF.

In September 2025, the court imposed sanctions on McKenzie for discovery violations, struck his remaining counterclaims, and entered judgment for MAF as to liability on its claim that McKenzie had tortiously interfered with agreements between Indiana and MAF.

Following a four-day jury trial in April 2026, the jury found in favor of MAF on claims that McKenzie infringed copyrights in USA FUN and The Ninth American Dream and infringed MAF’s registered LOVE trademark. The jury awarded MAF $2 million for copyright infringement, $6.2 million for trademark infringement, $89 million in compensatory damages for tortious interference with contract, and $5 million in punitive damages, for a total award of $102.2 million.

On July 10, 2026, U.S. District Judge Jennifer L. Rochon entered final judgment and granted MAF a permanent injunction relating to the intellectual-property rights and conduct adjudicated at trial. The injunction prohibits McKenzie and persons acting in concert with him from commercially exploiting unauthorized works incorporating the copyrights or LOVE trademark at issue in the litigation.

McKenzie subsequently moved for a new trial or, alternatively, to amend the final judgment.

== Writings ==
- Undine: A Journal of Art and Literature
- "Backstage at Saturday Night Live"
- "Billy Joel, [Ballantine Books, 1984].
- "Lucky Star: The Madonna Story, Contemporary Books, 1985. [Also Basis of ABC-TV show]
- "New, Used, and Improved: Art for the Eighties, Abbeville, 1987.
- "Larry Rivers: Prints and Multiples [Museum Books 1991]
- "Madonna, the Early Days: 65 Classic Photographs, Worldwide Televideo Enterprises (New York), 1993.
- "Robert Indiana: American Dream [MFA Books, 1995] with Robert Creeley
- "Dark Poetics: The Art of Donald Sultan [MFA Books, 1997]
- "Popular Art in America [Fotofolio, 2003]
- "The Metropolitan {with Philip Johnson} [Fotofolio 2005]
- "Meadowcraft: A Hampton’s Classic [Fotofolio 2008]
- "Robert Indiana A – Z [AI Books 2013]
