= Kay Turner =

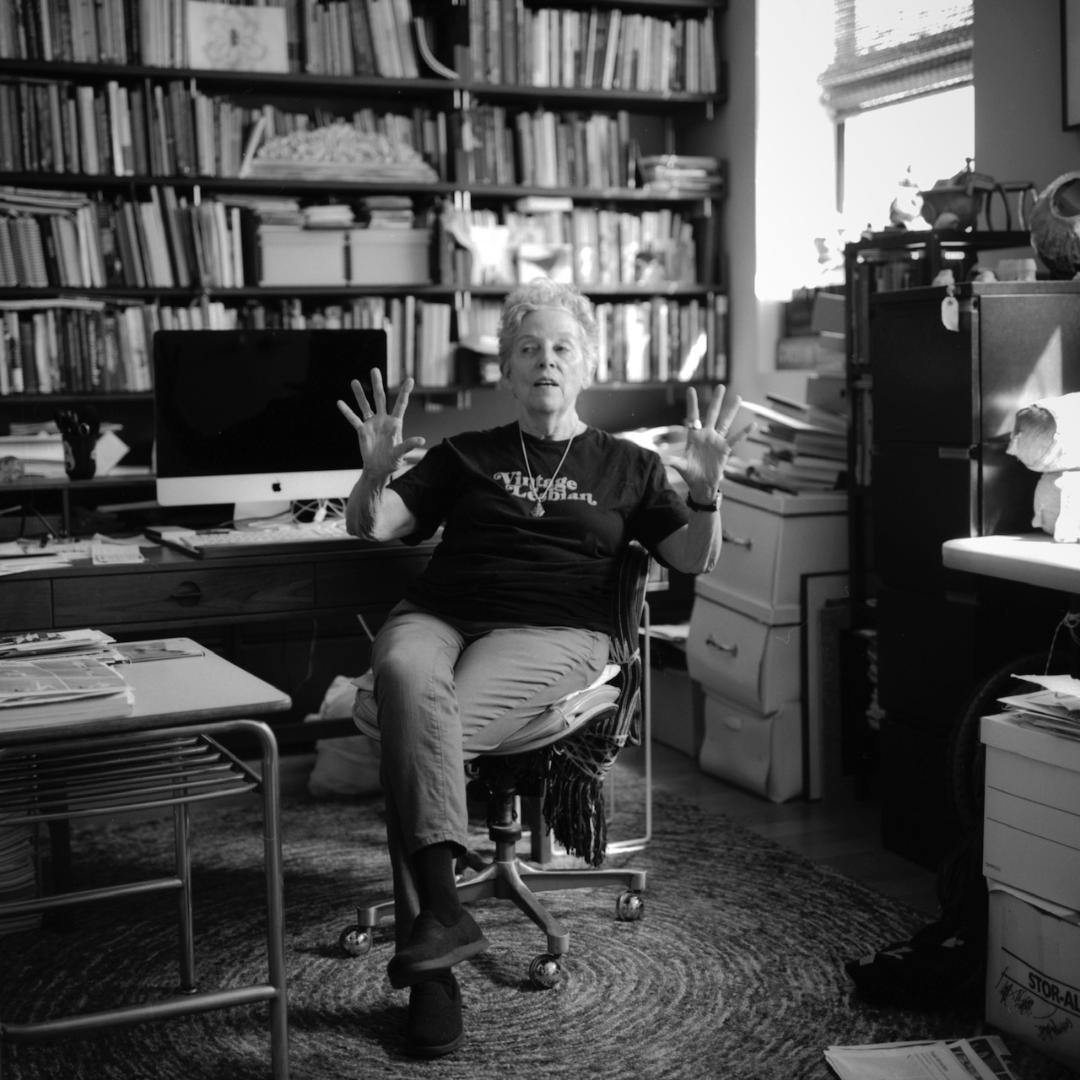
"Kay" by Riya Lerner (March 7, 2020)

Kay Turner is an artist and scholar working across disciplines including performance, writing, music, exhibition curation, and public and academic folklore. She is known for her feminist writings and performances on subjects such as women’s home altars, fairy-tale witches, and historical goddess figures. She co-founded “Girls in the Nose,” a lesbian feminist rock punk band that anticipated riot grrl.

== Personal life ==
Turner was born in 1948 in Detroit, Michigan and currently lives between Brooklyn, New York and Austin, Texas. Her spouse is Mary Sanger of Austin, TX.

== Career ==
=== Academic/public folklore work ===
Kay Turner received her B.A. (with honors) in Literature and Philosophy from Douglass College of Rutgers University in 1971. In 1979/1990, she earned her MA/PhD, respectively, in folklore and anthropology from the University of Texas at Austin. Her dissertation project, "Mexican American Women's Home Altars: The Art of Relationship," was the first of its kind to give serious study to home altars and vernacular altars as an aesthetic form. The subsequent book project, Beautiful Necessity: The Art and Meaning of Women's Altars (1999), is the most widely read of all of her publications, which also include books on the pop star Madonna, lesbian love letters, Gertrude Stein and Alice B. Tolkas, and on Grimms' fairy tales queerly revealed. Her research focuses on women’s studies, queer studies, and folk and contemporary art. In particular, she introduced queer theory to fairy tale scholarship with Transgressive Tales: Queering the Grimms, edited with Pauline Greenhill (2012).

Her work in folklore and performance evolved from two foundational art and performance projects of the early 1970s: Lady-Unique-Inclination-of-the Night, a feminist spirituality collective and art journal she founded in 1975 and The Oral Tradition, a lesbian music and comedy group she founded in 1972. For much of her career Turner has experimented with combining folklore scholarship and queer performance in innovative ways.

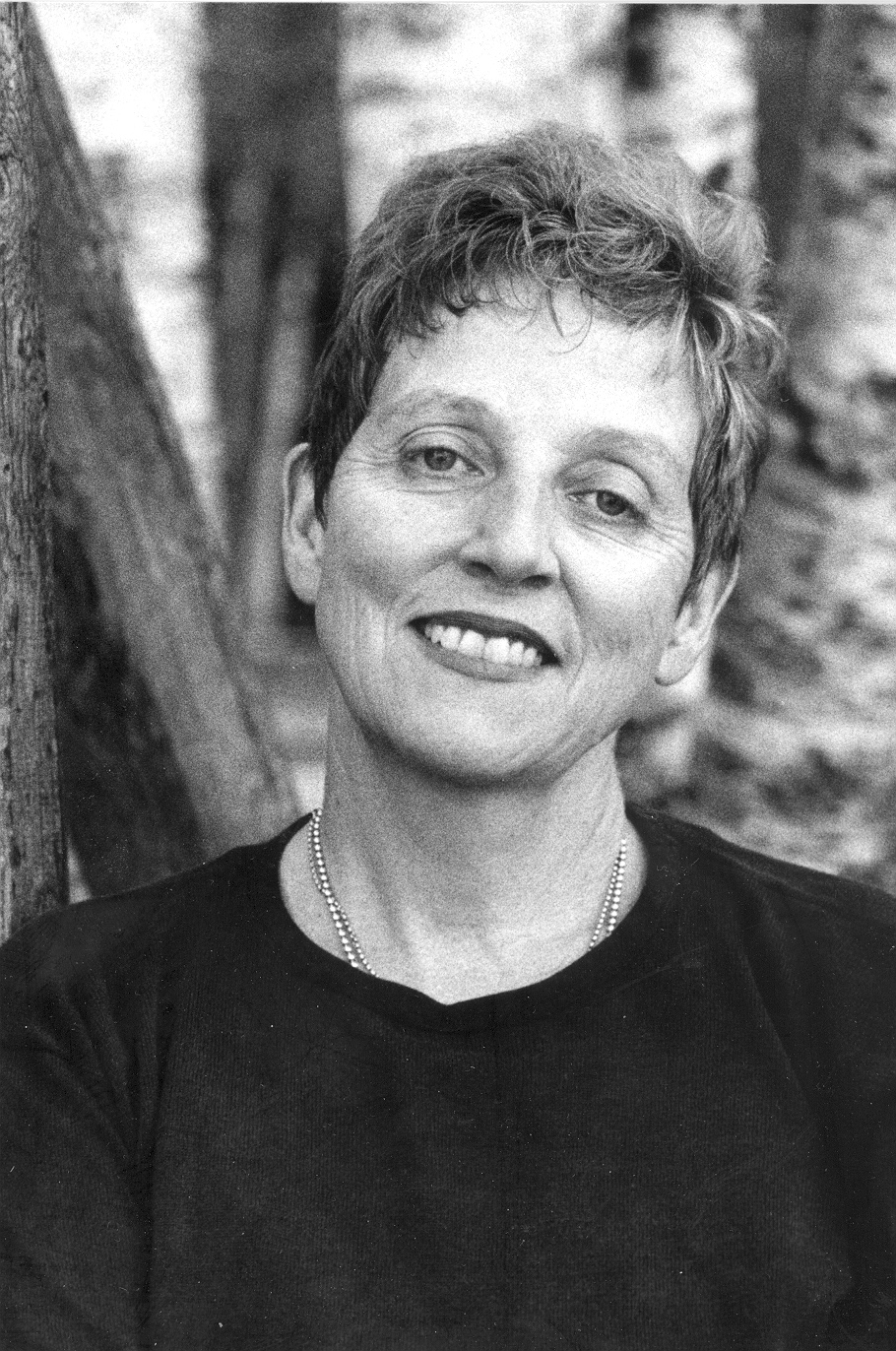
"Kay" by Belinda Kremer (2004)

Before earning her PhD, Turner worked as the interim director of the Folk Arts Collections at the San Antonio Museum of Art from 1982 to 1984. In 1984, Kay Turner, Pat Jasper, and Betsy Peterson founded the non-profit folk arts organization Texas Folklife Resources. Turner continued on as the associate director of Texas Folklife Resources until 1991. Turner went on to work as director of the Brooklyn Arts Council's Folk Arts Program from 2000 to 2014. In 2011, she joined the board of the New York Folklore Society. Turner has published articles in journals such as Journal of American Folklore and Western Folklore. As a public folklorist, Turner has researched, organized, and produced public programs, museum exhibitions, and folk music festivals. Turner served as president of the American Folklore Society from 2015 to 2018. She is also the founder and chief instigator (1989–2016) of “The Croning,” a ritual celebration of women folklorists over 50 years old held every three years at the American Folklore Society Annual Meeting.

In 2002, she became an adjunct assistant professor in the Department of Performance Studies at Tisch School of the Arts and the Center for the Study of Gender and Sexuality at New York University.

From 2000 to 2014 Turner was director of Folk Arts at the Brooklyn Arts Council (BAC). Turner has initiated a number of field research projects resulting in concert performances and exhibitions such as Praise in the Park: Musical Expressions of Faith; Local Eyes: Folk Photographers in Brooklyn; Williamsburg Bridge 100th Anniversary Celebration; Folk Feet: Celebrating Traditional Dance in Brooklyn; Here Was New York: Twin Towers in Memorial Images; Brooklyn Maqam: Arab Music Festival; Black Brooklyn Renaissance 1960–2010; Harborlore; Half the Sky: Brooklyn Women in Traditional Performances; Once Upon a Time in Brooklyn; and The Sweetest Song: Brooklyn Traditional Singers and Their Songs.

Turner has been the curator of various museum and gallery exhibitions including Art Among Us/Arte Entre Nosotros: Mexican American Folk Art of San Antonio, (with Pat Jasper), San Antonio Museum of Art (1986); The Art of Asking: Home Altars and Yard Shrines in the Texas-Mexican Community, Institute of Texan Cultures (1988); Local Eyes: Folk Photography in Brooklyn, Five Myles Gallery (2002); Homo Home: Queer Objects for Gay Living, Cinders Gallery, Williamsburg, Brooklyn (2006); and Here Was New York: Twin Towers in Vernacular Memorial Images, a multi-gallery exhibition of 350 photos, Brooklyn, New York.

Turner, who was president of the American Folklore Society from 2015 to 2018, has said "To be a folklorist is to be entrusted with a diverse body of critical cultural knowledge, art, and practice and to be just ornery enough to believe the world is better off if we share it out in teaching, researching, writing, consulting, public programming, advocating, archiving, and engaging with each other as members of our Society."

==== Awards and honors ====
- Turner was awarded with a Research Grant in Women's Studies and the Charlotte Newcombe Dissertation Fellowship by Woodrow Wilson National Fellowship Foundation in 1982.
- She received the Elli Köngäs-Maranda Prize in 2000. The Elli Köngäs-Maranda Prize is given to folklorists who create "superior work on women’s traditional, vernacular, or local culture and/or feminist theory and folklore."
- In 2013, Turner was awarded the Benjamin A. Botkin Prize. The prize honors the recipient for outstanding lifetime achievement in public folklore from the American Folklore Society.
- Also in 2013, Turner was inducted as a Fellow of the American Folklore Society and awarded by proclamation of the Brooklyn Borough President for her outstanding cultural service.
- She has been the recipient of public grants and foundation support for research and performance curation/presentation from (selected): National Endowment for the Arts; New York State Council on the Arts, New York City Department of Cultural Affairs, New York Council on the Humanities, Mertz Gilmore Foundation, New York Community Trust, Rockefeller Brothers Fund, Emma A. Sheafer Family Trust, American Express, MetLife, Social Sciences and Humanities Research Council of Canada (SSHRC).

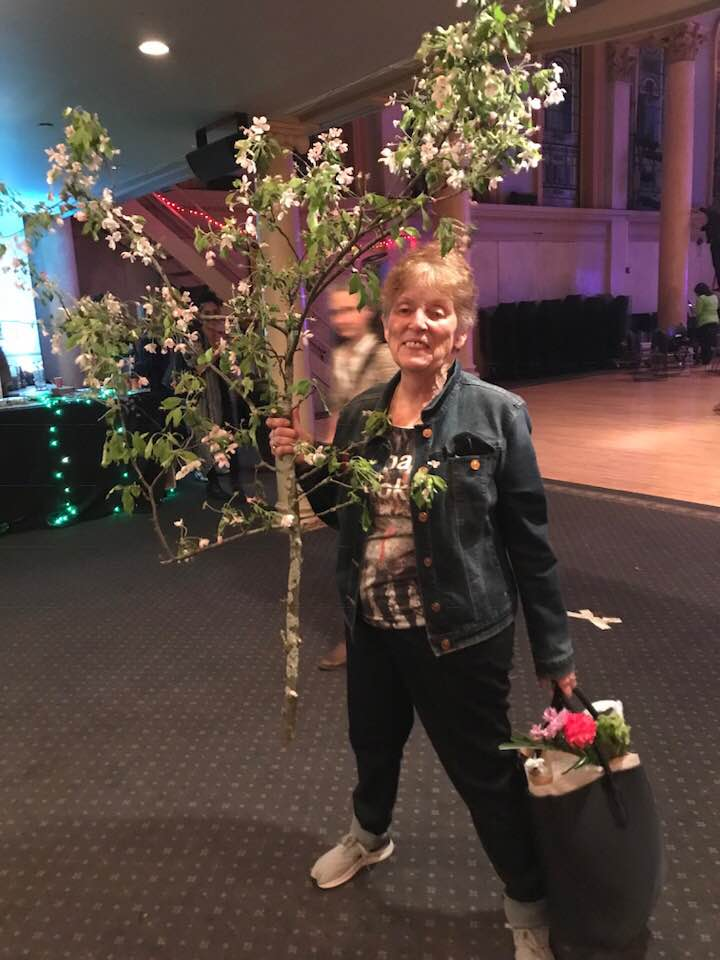
Kay at Great Small Works (2018)

=== Performance works ===
==== Performances ====
- (1972–1977) The Oral Tradition, New Brunswick, NJ. Lesbian feminist performance group founded by Turner; Motown and Beach Boys hits re-imagined as gay girl enticements. Performances from NYC to Boston to Philadelphia and D.C.
- (1975–1977) Feminist Rituals as Reclamation and Revolution, New Brunswick, NJ. Research-based inhabitations of various goddess figures performed at early Feminist Art and Spirituality Conferences in New York, Boston, New Jersey.
- (1979) Broken Mirror: Look as You Leap. Austin, TX. Women’s Performance and Sculpture Festival at Laguna Gloria Art Museum.
- (1993) Yoko Ono Day: Grapefruit Redux, Noon-Midnight Marathon Re-Performance of Yoko Ono's "Grapefruit". Austin, TX. Conceived and produced by Turner as a lesbian adjustment of the original.
- (2008) Extraordinary Rendition, Hamilton College, Clinton, NY. One-on-one durational performance transforming the politics of “enhanced interrogation” techniques into song rendition and private secret sharing.
- (2009) Creating Queer Genealogies: The Spinster Aunt Project, Denniston Hill Residency Program, Glen Wild, NY (and other sites). Oral history project with artists traces their lesbian lineage from a spinster aunt, then asks them to create an expressive family tree drawing with this relative at the center.
- (2011–2016) When Gertrude (Stein) Met Susan (Sontag): A Literary Love Fest (2011- 2016); theatrical performances in New York, NY; San Francisco, CA; Austin, TX.
- (1994 and 2019). Lesbopalooza: Lesbian Performance Extravaganza (celebrating the 25th and 50th anniversaries of the Stonewall Uprising, NYC).
- (2020) Persephone Returns/Persephone’s Revenge, multi-media, immersive performance and workshop. Daniels Faculty Gallery, University of Toronto. Rescheduled due to Coronavirus pandemic.
- (2012-ongoing) What a Witch. Performance and book project exploring the witch figure in folklore, history and performance.
  - Performances (selected):
    - (2012) “What a Witch: Unstitching the Witch in Grimms’ Tales,” A.I.R. Gallery, Brooklyn, NY;
    - (2014) “The Black Kiss” (with artist Mary Beth Edelson), Le Quartier Contemporary Art Center, Quimper, France;
    - (2015) “What a Witch: Recognition.” Five Myles Gallery, Brooklyn, NY.
    - (2016) “What a Witch: Evidence." Soho20 Gallery, Brooklyn, NY, with Kate Conroy.
    - (2017)“Before and After: What the Witch’s Nose Knows that Andy Warhol’s Nose Can Never Know,” A.I.R. Gallery, Brooklyn, NY;
    - (2017) “Hansel and Gretel Queered (Devouring),” OUTsider: Queer Arts Festival, Austin, TX;
    - (2018) “Night Hags: Visitation” Parsons School of Design, The New School, NY, NY;
    - (2018) ”Muses of Malta: Witch, Goddess, Madonna,” Fragmenta Contemporary Arts, Valletta, Malta;
    - (2016-ongoing) “Spurning Fertility/ Smashing Tchotchkes,” Abrons Art Center, NY; University of Winnipeg, Manitoba; Austin, TX;
    - (2019) “As the crow flies…”Kaaterskill Gallery, Catskill Mountain Foundation.
- (2020) Persephone’s Return/Persephone’s Revenge, multi-media, immersive performance and workshop. Daniels Faculty Gallery, University of Toronto. Rescheduled due to Coronavirus pandemic.
- (2024) The Double Sun with Elizabeth Insogna at Bill Arning Exhibitions.
- (2024) A Ritual of Recognition and Initiatory Rites at Tappeto Volante Gallery with Elizabeth Insogna.
- (2024) A Ritual for Exquisite Traces with Elizabeth Insogna at Princeton Day School's Anne Reid '72 Gallery.

===== Music (selected) =====
- “The Oral Tradition.” Aka “Risk-Kay and the Oral Tradition” (with Nancy Dean, Joanna Labow, and Paula Schorr).
- (1985–1996, currently revived and ongoing) “Girls in the Nose,” band. Co-founded in 1985 with Gretchen Phillips and Betsy Peterson.
- (2013-ongoing) “Otherwise: Queer Scholarship into Song” band with Viva DeConcini and Mary Feaster.
- (2023–ongoing) "Kay Turn Her and the Pages" band with Kay Turner (vocals), Viva DeConcini (guitar), and Mary Feaster (bass). Lesbian feminist songbook band of songs written or co-written by Kay Turner.

==== Public folklore research and performance curation ====
Selected public folklore performance projects conceived, curated and presented in collaboration with Brooklyn traditional artists, Brooklyn Arts Council, Brooklyn, NY:

- (2003) Williamsburg Bridge 100th Anniversary: Celebrating the People’s Bridge;
- (2004–2010) Folk Feet: Celebrating Traditional Dance in Brooklyn;
- (2008) Days of the Dead in Brooklyn: Diverse Traditions of Mourning and Remembrance;
- (2008) Brooklyn Maqam: Arab Music Festival;
- (2009–2011) Black Brooklyn Renaissance 1960–2010;
- (2011) Once Upon a Time in Brooklyn: Traditional Storytellers and Their Tales;
- (2012) Half the Sky: Brooklyn Women in Traditional Performance;
- (2013) The Sweetest Song: Brooklyn Traditional Singers and Their Songs;
- (2004–2011) September 11 Remembered, (2004–2011.) Annual art and performance project for New Yorkers who survived the day culminating in the multi-media “Rethinking Memorial: Ephemeral Gestures for September 11th,” September 10, 2011.

==== Talks and lectures (selected, 2003-2020) ====
- (2003) "The Williamsburg Bridge: Celebrating the People's Bridge." Keynote Address, 100th Anniversary Celebration for the Williamsburg Bridge, New York City.
- (2004) "Thirty Years Later: The Continuing Challenge and Appeal of Interpreting Traditional Home Altars. " Keynote Speaker. Louisiana Folklore Society. Baton Rouge, LA.
- (2004) "Rethinking Women's Altar Traditions." Folklore Department, University of Pennsylvania.
- (2007) "Famously Unknown: Marginal Women and the Lost History of Womyn's Music." Keynote address and performance. Women, Rock and Politics Conference. University of Georgia, Athens.
- (2011) “Illuminating Irritation: Creativity meets Activism.” We Stand the Storm panel with Toshi Reagon. Westbeth, NYC.
- (2012) “What a Witch: Rethinking the Old Hag for New Times.” A.I.R. Gallery, New York.
- (2015) “Witches Wielding Words: Women Unsilenced in the Grimms’ Fairy Tales.” Borough of Manhattan Community College.
- (2015) “Lady-Unique, 1976-1983: An Early Feminist Art Journal Publishing New York Artists.” Recovering a Lost Cultural Herstory, 1969-1982: New York Feminist Artists Speak-Out, Fordham University.
- (2017) “The Witch in Flight: At the Intersection of Folkloristics, Performance, Feminism, and Queer Theory.” American Folklore Society Presidential Address, Minneapolis, MN.
- (2018) “The Plentitude of the Ephemeral, or Fast, Cheap, and Out of Control.” Fife Honor Lecture, Utah State University, Logan, UT.
- (2019) “Mayahuel Meets Guadalupe: Ecology of Faith and Practice in the Borderlands.” Agave Arts Festival, Marfa, TX.
- (2020) “The Altar as a Site of Representation and Activation in Contemporary Queer Art.” Denny Dimin Gallery, NYC.

==== Curatorial ====
- (1979–1981) Women’s Public Art. Site-specific installations on various feminist themes, Co-Founder and Curator with Rita Starpattern, Austin, TX.
- (1980) La Vela Prendida: Home Altars and Mexican-American Devotional Arts. Texas Memorial Museum, Austin. Curator with Mary Margaret Návar, Alicia Gonzalez, and Pat Jasper.
- (1986) Art Among Us/Arte Entre Nosotros: Mexican American Folk Art in San Antonio. Texas Folklife Resources and San Antonio Museum of Art. (co-curated with Pat Jasper).
- (1986–1987) Home Altars and the Arts of Devotion. INTAR Gallery, New York City, with travel to additional museum sites in Los Angeles, San Francisco, and Minneapolis.
- (1986–1987) Handmade and Heartfelt: Contemporary Folk Art in Texas. Texas Folklife Resources in conjunction with Laguna Gloria Art Museum, Austin, Texas; travel to additional museum sites in Texas. (co-curated with Pat Jasper and Elizabeth Peterson).
- (1988–1990) The Art of Asking: Home Altars and Yard Shrines in the Texas-Mexican Community. Institute of Texan Cultures and additional sites.
- (1990–1992) Hecho Tejano: Four Texas-Mexican Traditional Sculptors in Clay, Wood, and Cement. Travelling exhibition. Texas Folklife Resources.
- (2002) Local Eyes: Folk Photographers in Brooklyn, Five Myles Gallery.
- (2003) Williamsburg Bridge 100th Anniversary: Spanning a Century of Change. Month-long festival events.
- (2004–2011) Folk Feet: Celebrating Traditional Dance in Brooklyn. Multi-year research, documentation, and presentation of various traditional dances. Brooklyn Arts Council.
- (2006) Homo Home: Queer Objects for Gay Living. Cinders Gallery, Williamsburg, Brooklyn.
- (2006) Here Was New York: Twin Towers in Vernacular Memorial Images. Multi-gallery exhibition of 350 photos. Brooklyn, New York.
- (2008) Brooklyn Maqam Arab Music Festival. Multi-venue traditional music festival. Brooklyn Arts Council.
- (2010–2011) Black Brooklyn Renaissance, 1960–2010. Brooklyn Arts Council.

=== Published works ===
==== Books ====
- (1976–1983) Lady-Unique-Inclination-of-the-Night: A Journal of the Goddess in Art, History, and Performance. Founded, edited, designed by Kay Turner. New Brunswick, NJ: Sowing Circle Press.
- (1980) Folklore Papers, Editor. Special Issue, “Parades, Processions and Pilgrimage.” University Folklore Association: University of Texas.
- (1986) Art Among Us/ Arte Entre Nosotros: Mexican American Folk Art in San Antonio (with Pat Jasper). San Antonio, Texas: San Antonio Museum Association Press. Catalog for exhibition of the same title curated by Jasper and Turner.
- (1993) I Dream of Madonna: Women's Dreams of the Goddess of Pop. Collins Publishers. 1993. ISBN 978-0002552578.
- (1996) Between us: A Legacy of Lesbian Love Letters. Chronicle Books. 1996. ISBN 978-0811814423.
- (1999) Baby Precious Always Shines: Selected Love Notes Between Gertrude Stein and Alice B. Toklas. St. Martin's Press. 21 December 1999. ISBN 978-0312198329.
- (1999) Beautiful Necessity: The Art and Meaning of Women's Altars. Thames & Hudson. 1999. ISBN 978-0500281505.
- (2012) Transgressive Tales: Queering the Grimms. Wayne State University Press. 2012. ISBN 978-0814334812. (with Pauline Greenhill)
- (2020) Before and After: What the Witch's Nose Knows that Andy Warhol's Nose Doesn't Know. A.I.R. Gallery. 17 December 2017. ISBN 978-1-63760-766-4.
- (Forthcoming 2026) What a Witch: The Wise Woman in Folklore, History, and Performance.

==== Chapters and essays ====
- (1978) “Contemporary Feminist Rituals.” Heresies: Journal of Feminism and Art #5, The Goddess. Vol 2, No. 1: 20–2.
- (1980) “The Virgin of Sorrows Procession: A Brooklyn Inversion.” Folklore Papers of the University Folklore Association 9: 1-35. Austin: University of Texas.
- (1981) “Understanding Feminist Rituals.” The Politics of Women's Spirituality. Charlene Spretnak, ed. Pp. 219-233. Garden City: Doubleday.
- (1982) “Mexican American Women's Home Altars: Towards Their Interpretation.” Aztlán: A Journal of Chicano Studies 13, Nos.1 and 2: 309–326.
- (1986) “Home Altars and the Art of Devotion.” Chicano Expressions: A New View in American Art. 40-48. New York: INTAR Gallery.
- (1983) “The Cultural Semiotics of Religious Icons: La Virgen de San Juan de Los Lagos” Semiotica 47-1/4: 317–361.
- (1983) “Why we are so inclined : A Feminist Perspective on the Art of Women's Home Altars.” Lady-Unique-Inclination-of-the- Night 6: 4–18.
- (1986) “La calle, la casa, y la esquina: A Look at the Art Among Us” (with Pat Jasper). Art Among Us/ Arte Entre Nosotros : Mexican American Folk Art in San Antonio. Kay Turner and Pat Jasper, eds. 10-39. San Antonio, Texas: San Antonio Museum Association.
- (1992) “‘Because of This Photography’: The Making of a Mexican Folk Saint.” Niño Fidencio: A Heart Thrown Open. Dore Gardner, ed. 120-134. Santa Fe: Museum of New Mexico Press.
- (1993) “Challenging the Canon: Folklore Theory Reconsidered from Feminist Perspectives,” (with M. Jane Young). Feminist Theory and the Study of Folklore. Susan Tower Hollis, Linda Pershing, and M. Jane Young, eds. 9-28. Champaign: University of Illinois Press.
- (1993) “Giving an Altar: The Ideology of Reproduction in a St. Joseph's Day Feast.” (with Suzanne Seriff). Feminist Theory and the Study of Folklore. Susan Tower Hollis, Linda Pershing, and M. Jane Young, eds. 89-117. Champaign: University of Illinois Press.
- (1996) “Hacer Cosas: Recycled Arts and the Making of Identity in Texas-Mexican Culture.” Recycled/Reseen: Folk Art From the Global Scrap Heap. Charlene Cerny and Suzanne K. Seriff, eds. 60-71. New York: Harry N. Abrams Publishers.
- (2007) "Here Was New York: Memorial Images of the Twin Towers." VOICES: Journal of New York Folklore 33, Fall/Winter: 24-34. Schenectady: New York Folklore Society.
- (2008) "Voces de Fe: Mexican American Altaristas in South Texas." In Mexican American Religions: Spirituality, Activism, and Culture. Gastón Espinosa and Mario García, eds. 180-205. Durham: Duke University Press.
- (2009) "September 11: The Burden of the Ephemeral." Western Folklore 68 (2/3), Spring/Summer: 155–208.
- (2012) “Once Upon a Queer Time: Introduction to Transgressive Tales” (with Pauline Greenhill). Transgressive Tales: Queering the Grimms. Kay Turner and Pauline Greenhill, eds. pp. 1–24. Detroit: Wayne State University Press.
- (2012) “Playing with Fire: Truth as Transgression in Grimms’ ‘Frau Trude.’” Transgressive Tales: Queering the Grimms. Kay Turner and Pauline Greenhill, eds. 245-274. Detroit: Wayne State University Press.
- (2015) “Liliana Wilson: Learning to Live Finally." Ofrenda/Offering: Liliana Wilson’s Art of Dissidence and Dreams. Norma Cantú, ed. 60-81. Bryan-College Station: Texas A and M Press.
- (2015) “At Home in the Realm of Enchantment: The Queer Enticements of the Grimms’ ‘Frau Holle.’” Marvels & Tales: Journal of Fairy Tale Studies 29/1: 42–63.
- (2015) “’In my genes sit sorceresses:’ Doris Stauffer’s Art of Bewitchment.” Doris Stauffer: A Monograph, with Essays by Michael Hiltbrunner, Kay Turner, and Mara Züst. Simone Koller and Mara Züst, eds. Chicago: University of Chicago Press/ Zurich: Scheidegger/Spiess.
- (2019) “Neighbors and Witches in Times of Conflict.” Marvels & Tales: Journal of Fairy Tale Studies 33.1: 25–50.
- (2021) “Deep Folklore/Queer Folkloristics.” Advancing Folkoristics, Kristina Downs, Jesse Fivecoate, and Meredith McGriff, eds. Bloomington: Indiana University Press.
- (2021) “Folklorist as Performer.” What Folklorists Do: Professional Realities and Possibilities in Folklore Studies. Tim Lloyd, ed. Bloomington: Indiana University Press.
- (2021) "Preface: #MeToo: Cri de Coeur and Cri de Corps (A Cry from the Heart and Body of a Woman." Ulrich Marzolph, Regina F. Bendix, Francisco Vaz da Silva, eds. Narrative Culture, Detroit: Wayne State University. 8: 1-6.
- (2021) "Deep Folklore/Queer Folkloristics." Jesse A. Fivecoate, Kristina Downs, and Meredith A. E. McGriff, eds. Advancing Folkloristics, Bloomington: Indiana University Press. 10-34.
- (2023) "A Queer Time: That is Not Yet Here." Cory W. Thorne, Guillermo De Los Reyes, eds. Journal of Folklore Research, Bloomington: University of Indiana. 1-13.
- (2024) "Queer Kinship in the Grimms' ″The Three Spinning Women″: Challenging the Binary." Pauline Greenhill, Jennifer Orme, eds. Just Wonder: Shifting Perspectives in Tradition, Denver: Utah State University Press. 175-195.
- (2024) "Hekate: Goddess for the Twenty-First." Kari Adelaide Razdow, ed. Enchanted Pedagogies: Archetypes, Magic, and Knowledge, Leiden|Boston: Brill. 14: 183-194.
- (Forthcoming) “The Virgin Mary’s Body: Immaculate Rejection.” Vernacular Religion. Leonard Primiano, ed.

=== Video works ===
- (1980) Home Altars: A Women’s Tradition.' (Producer/Director with Pat Jasper, Mary Margaret Návar, and Alicia Gonzalez) Austin Community Television in conjunction with the Texas Committee for the Humanities.
- (1990) Get It, Girl: Lesbians Talk About Sex'. (Producer/Director, with Ella Gant).
- (1994) "Breast Exam" with live interviews on the Breast Throne. Music video. Producer/Director/ Editor (with Lynn Keller and Donna Shepherd, co-editors) for Girls in the Nose.
- (2010–2011) Black Brooklyn Renaissance: Black Arts and Culture, 1960–2010. Year-long research, public programming, and video documentation project on the contribution of Black traditional performance arts and artists to Brooklyn and beyond over a 50-year period. Public programming from Feb. 2010-Feb. 2011; produced a 73 video disc collection of 110 interviews with artists and video documentation of all public performance. Archived at The Brooklyn Public Library, Brooklyn Collections; The Schomburg Center; and Brooklyn Academy of Music Archive.
