= Madonna Songbook =

Book by Giulio Mazzoleni

- Book cover
- Author: Giulio Mazzoleni
- Language: English
- Subject: Madonna
- Genre: Reference work
- Publisher: Antiga Edizioni
- Publication date: December 9, 2024
- Publication place: Italy
- Media type: Print (Hardcover)
- Pages: 712
- ISBN: 978-88-8435-485-3

Madonna Songbook is a music reference book by Italian author Giulio Mazzoleni, chronicling the musical career of American singer Madonna. The book was released in December 2024 by Antiga Edizioni and examines more than 500 songs spanning 45 years of the singer's career. A fan of Madonna since 1985, Mazzoleni spent the following decades collecting recordings, photographs, articles and interviews related to her career. In 2022, after purchasing a similar publication about Prince, he decided to document Madonna's recorded work.

The book includes songwriting and production credits, previously unreleased material, and original interviews with her musical collaborators. Mazzoleni focused on Madonna's contributions as a songwriter and record producer, believing that her musical abilities had often been overshadowed by her public image and controversies. His research included consultations of archival recordings at the Library of Congress in Washington, D.C. The book received favorable reviews from music publications, with critics praising its extensive documentation and visual presentation.

== Summary ==
Madonna Songbook traces the development of Madonna's music from her earliest songwriting and recording experiments in the late 1970s to her releases in the 2020s. It examines her studio albums, singles, demos and unreleased songs, remixes and live performances, exploring the origins of individual compositions and the contributions of her musical collaborators. The book incorporates excerpts from Madonna's interviews alongside accounts from musicians, songwriters and producers who worked with her. The book is divided into 18 chronological chapters, each corresponding to a different period of Madonna's musical career. Each chapter is color-coded and contains individual song entries with songwriting, production and recording credits. Interspersed throughout the chapters are retrospectives of her concert tours, including set lists and accompanying musicians, and profiles of selected musical collaborators.

== Background and writing ==
Italian music industry professional Giulio Mazzoleni had worked in artist management, media consulting and the recording industry for approximately 25 years, including on the promotion of Madonna's studio albums MDNA (2012) and Rebel Heart (2015). Mazzoleni first became interested in Madonna in the autumn of 1985, when a schoolmate introduced him to her music. He recalled hearing "Into the Groove" on the radio and watching the music video for "Dress You Up", particularly admiring the keyboard sounds and vocals of the former and the energy of the live performance featured in the latter. From that period onwards, Mazzoleni began collecting recordings, photographs, newspaper articles and interviews concerning the singer.

The idea for Madonna Songbook originated in December 2022, when Mazzoleni purchased a book examining the songs of Prince, published by Hachette. Having encountered similar publications devoted to David Bowie and Queen, he questioned the absence of a comparable work on Madonna. His friend Matthew Rettenmund, author of Encyclopedia Madonnica, encouraged him to undertake the project himself. Mazzoleni believed that Madonna's public image and controversies had overshadowed her abilities as a songwriter and producer, with her musical success often attributed to her collaborators rather than her own talent.

Mazzoleni initially worked on the book in his spare time, but after finding a publisher, he took a year off from artist management to focus on writing. He worked chronologically, using his personal archives, consulting music publishing records and interviewing Madonna's collaborators. Among those interviewed were songwriters and producers Stephen Bray, Rick Nowels and André Betts, backing vocalists Donna De Lory and Niki Haris, and musicians and recording engineers including Paul Pesco, Doug Wimbish and Brian Malouf. The author also traveled to the Library of Congress in Washington, D.C., to examine recordings deposited for copyright registration. He found three unreleased demos from the Bedtime Stories (1994) recording sessions: "Something's Coming Over", "I Will Always Have You" and "Bring It". As recording was not permitted, Mazzoleni listened to the tapes and took handwritten notes, describing this as the most difficult part of his research.

== Publication ==
The volume was published in December 2024 by Antiga Edizioni in Italy. The book was released as a limited-edition English-language hardcover containing 712 pages and measuring 220 × 265 mm. The book was designed by New York-based graphic designer Anthony Coombs, with cover artwork by Carlo Rossi. Pre-orders opened in October 2024, with copies ordered directly from the publisher accompanied by a print of Rossi's cover artwork.

The book was dedicated to Madonna's longtime publicist Liz Rosenberg. In an interview with First Night Magazine in March 2025, Mazzoleni stated that Madonna's team had expressed appreciation for the project and that Rosenberg had reacted positively to receiving the book. As part of its promotion, a presentation was scheduled for December 16, 2024, at 21 House of Stories Navigli in Milan. Another presentation was scheduled for May 27, 2025, at the Biblioteca Salaborsa in Bologna, featuring a conversation between Mazzoleni and journalist Federica Augusta Rossi.

== Critical response ==
The music reference project received favorable reviews from music publications. In the March–April 2025 issue of Classic Pop, the book received four out of five stars. The reviewer noted how the controversies surrounding Madonna throughout her career had often overshadowed her music. Franco Zanetti of the Italian music website Rockol rated the book 8.5 out of 10, praising its graphic design and photographic material. He considered it essential for Madonna's fans, despite its considerable size, weight and high price, and noted that its English-language publication was intended to reach an international readership. Francesco Castagna of AUT Magazine praised the book's focus on Madonna as a songwriter and producer and Mazzoleni's research into her unreleased recordings.

== Publication history ==
Region	Release date	Format	Publisher	ISBN
Italy	December 2024	Hardcover	Antiga Edizioni	ISBN 978-88-8435-485-3
