= Mary Gabriel (author) =

American journalist and biographer

- Born: 1955 (age 70–71)
- Alma mater: Maryland Institute College of Art; American University; University of Paris
- Occupations: Journalist, editor, biographer
- Writing career
- Genres: Biography, history
- Notable works: Love and Capital; Ninth Street Women; Madonna: A Rebel Life
- Notable awards: Mary Lynn Kotz Award (2019); NYU/Axinn Foundation Prize (2022)

Mary Gabriel is an American journalist, editor, and biographer. She worked for Reuters for nearly two decades, primarily in Washington, D.C., and London. She has written five biographies, including Love and Capital (2011), Ninth Street Women (2018), and Madonna: A Rebel Life (2023).

== Early life and education ==
Gabriel is a native of Minneapolis, Minnesota. She earned a Bachelor of Fine Arts from the Maryland Institute College of Art, a master's degree in journalism from American University, and a diploma from the University of Paris at the Sorbonne.

== Career ==
Gabriel worked as a reporter and editor for the Baltimore News-American and United Press International (UPI). She subsequently served as executive editor of the arts magazine Museum & Arts Washington.

At Reuters, Gabriel worked as a reporter and editor for nearly two decades. Her work included the agency's international news desk, with assignments in Washington and London. She also recalled working in the Middle East and Africa during her journalism career.

=== As author ===
Gabriel published her first biography, Notorious Victoria, about women's rights activist Victoria Woodhull, in 1998. She followed it with The Art of Acquiring (2002), about art collectors Etta and Claribel Cone.

Her third book, Love and Capital: Karl and Jenny Marx and the Birth of a Revolution (2011), examines the personal lives of Karl Marx and Jenny von Westphalen. It was a finalist for the National Book Award, National Book Critics Circle Award, and Pulitzer Prize for Biography or Autobiography. Her fourth book, Ninth Street Women (2018), examines five women painters associated with abstract expressionism. It received the 2019 Mary Lynn Kotz Award and the 2022 NYU/Axinn Foundation Prize for Narrative Nonfiction.

In 2023, Gabriel published Madonna: A Rebel Life, a biography of American singer Madonna, inspired by the singer's 2016 Billboard Women in Music Woman of the Year acceptance speech. The book was included in The Guardian's selection of the best memoirs and biographies of 2023 and was a finalist for the 2024 PEN/Jacqueline Bograd Weld Award for Biography.

== Books ==
- 1998: Notorious Victoria: The Uncensored Life of Victoria Woodhull - Visionary, Suffragist, and First Woman to Run for President. Algonquin Books.
- 2002: The Art of Acquiring: A Portrait of Etta & Claribel Cone. Bancroft Press.
- 2011: Love and Capital: Karl and Jenny Marx and the Birth of a Revolution. Little, Brown and Company.
- 2018: Ninth Street Women: Lee Krasner, Elaine de Kooning, Grace Hartigan, Joan Mitchell, and Helen Frankenthaler: Five Painters and the Movement That Changed Modern Art. Little, Brown and Company.
- 2023: Madonna: A Rebel Life. Little, Brown and Company.
