= Christopher Bergland =

American athlete, activist, and writer

- Occupation: Athlete Political Activist Writer

Christopher Bergland is an American athlete, political activist, and writer. On April 30, 2004, Bergland set the world record for the longest distance run on a treadmill in a 24-hour period at 153.76-mile (247.45 km).

== Career ==
Bergland is a three-time champion of the Triple Iron Man, the longest known non-stop triathlon with a 336-mile (541 km) bicycle section, 7.2-mile (11.6 km) swim, and a 78.6-mile (126.5 km) run. He is known for being a world-class athlete and one of the "world's greatest openly gay athletes".

Bergland is part of the Alliance for a Healthier Generation's fight against the problematic childhood obesity epidemic in the United States, and is co-organizer of the annual Provincetown 10K charity run in Provincetown, Massachusetts.

Bergland is an author of the book The Athlete's Way, in which he offers lessons, advice and strategies about becoming and staying fit.

== Personal life ==
Bergland and his wife had a daughter in 2007. He resides in both Provincetown, Massachusetts and San Francisco.
