= Philip Kamin =

Canadian photographer

Philip Kamin is a music photographer from Toronto, Canada (circa 1955). It has been reported that "unlike most of his peers, Kamin kept most of his collection from the public and copyrighted the images. Some of these he provided to the stars he toured with, others went into 35 music titles his publishing company produced. But thousands of amazing rock and roll images stayed archived in his personal collection." Philip Kamin picked up a camera for the first time in July 1978. A chance encounter with Phil Collins led him to instantly become tour photographer for Genesis. His work met with immediate success, spreading his name throughout the United Kingdom’s rock’n’roll circuit. What set Philip Kamin’s work apart from many industry photographers was exclusivity: he never sold his photographs to newspapers, magazines or photo agencies. Kamin built his solid reputation by touring and selling his work directly to the bands he photographed, the bands’ managers, their public relations firms, record companies or merchandisers.

== Education ==
Kamin studied social work at Ryerson University.

== Career ==
Kamin has "published over 90 books, including 40 in music, plus novels, non fiction, trade paperbacks and coffee table books in a variety of subjects."

In addition to Genesis, Kamin has worked with The Rolling Stones, Mick Jagger, Paul McCartney & Wings, Bob Dylan, Led Zeppelin, Pink Floyd, The Who, Peter Gabriel, Phil Collins, YES, The Clash, AC/DC, Rush, King Crimson, Bill Bruford, Van Halen, Roxy Music, Black Sabbath, The Cars, John Belushi, and Dan Aykroyd, just to name a few. Kamin did his last shoot in May 1985 for Madonna. Philip’s work received such critical acclaim that he formed a publishing company in 1982, producing full-color 128 page books documenting the tours of many of the above-mentioned groups. These books were sold across Canada, the U.S., England, Australia, France, Germany, the rest of Europe and Japan.

The key to his success was a quick turn-around time. Philip would have a book released while the band was still on tour, giving fans the latest stories, interviews, pictures and new images of the act. He repeated the formula with the fashion, entertainment and sports books. Philip Kamin Publishing Inc. has produced over 40 music titles, selling between 35,000 and 150,000 copies each worldwide. This led Kamin Publishing to produce other books on fashion, entertainment, the Royals, movie stars, health, sports and fictional books, including romance and action-adventure novels. These books were distributed by top publishing houses, including McGraw-Hill, Barrons, St. Martin’s Press, MacMillan, Prentice Hall, Random House, Hal Leonard Music Publishing, New American Library, Sidgwick & Jackson, Virgin Publishing Group, New English Library, Methuen, McClellend & Stewart, CBC Publishing, Optimum Internationales, General Publishing, Berkley, Harper Collins, and Shinko. Accumulated sales have totaled over 2,500,000 copies with a retail value of over $25,000,000.

Philip Kamin’s work has appeared on record album covers, earning him his gold record awards. His photographs have also appeared on video jackets, tour programs, publicity photos and ad campaigns, as well as posters, clocks, cards, coasters, watches, etc.
