= Martin H. M. Schreiber =

Czech-American photographer (born 1946)

Martin Hugo Maximilian Schreiber (born 14 June 1946) is a Czech-American photographer. He is best known for his photographs of women, particularly a nude shot of Madonna taken in 1979.

== Biography ==
Schreiber was born in Prague to Francis Robert Schreiber and Marta Olga Wallenfels Sebelikova. The family emigrated to the United States in 1952.

As a teenager, he won his first photo competition, a third prize in colour in The New York Telegram and Sun competition, with the photo of a rose taken with a Yashica Lynx 1000, a simple 35 mm range finder.

Schreiber attended one year at Iona College. He then enlisted in the army for photography and went to a photo lab school for 10 weeks and then was sent to Germany in an Intelligence Unit where he spent two years in Stuttgart. He did freelance work for The New York Times and for Woman Wear Daily. He had his first exhibition in Stuttgart during this period. Upon his discharge in 1968, he then spent a semester at the School of Visual Arts in New York. He then became official photographer on an archaeological expedition in Knidos, Turkey. In 1971, he won an honorable mention, out of 40,000 entrants in the first Life magazine photography contest. He started showing his work in galleries in 1976.

From 1977, he taught a course at the photography department of the Parsons School of Design on photographing the nude, which he did for the next 7–8 years. He also taught at the School of Visual Arts for two semesters, a course on basic photography and darkroom.

In 1989, Schreiber moved to Europe. He travels in Europe, the United States, South and Central America, The Caribbean, Russia, Australia and North Africa.

He has shot fashion, portraits, children, a good deal of reportages, travel and lifestyle photographs. He has had 100 exhibitions throughout the world either one man shows or group shows. He is also a sculptor and has appeared as an actor in films.

=== Photograph of Madonna ===
In 1985, Schreiber recognised Madonna on the cover of Time magazine and remembered that she had been one of his models in 1979. The photos he took of her were published in Playboy for the September 1985 issue, and these photos have since been published worldwide and still are.

== Selected works ==
- Bodyscapes (1980)
- Last of a Breed (1982)
- The Majestic World of Arabian Horses (1986)
- I, Madonna (1988)
- Madonna Nudes 1979 (1990)
- Cafe D'Artistes A Paris (1998)
- Chef Daniel Boulud, Cooking In New York City (2002)
- Madonna Nudes II (2015)
- Last Of A Breed II (2015)
- Retrospections (2015)
- The Rape of Prague (journal) (2015)
