= Christopher Ciccone =

American artist (1960–2024)

- Born: Christopher Gerard Ciccone; November 22, 1960; Pontiac, Michigan, U.S.
- Died: October 4, 2024 (aged 63); Petoskey, Michigan, U.S.
- Other name: Chris Ciccone
- Education: Western Michigan University; Oakland University
- Occupations: Artist; designer; interior decorator
- Spouse: Ray Thacker (m. 2016)
- Relatives: Madonna (sister); Lourdes Leon (niece)

Christopher Gerard Ciccone (/tʃɪˈkoʊni/ chih-KOH-nee; November 22, 1960 – October 4, 2024) was an American visual artist, interior decorator, and designer in New York, Miami, and Los Angeles. He was the younger brother of American singer Madonna.

Ciccone began his professional career as a dancer with Le Groupe de La Place Royale. He was a dancer for his sister Madonna early in her career. He eventually became the art director for Madonna's Blond Ambition World Tour in 1990 and he was the tour director for her tour, The Girlie Show, in 1993. Ciccone also directed music videos for Dolly Parton and Tony Bennett among others. In 2008, he released The New York Times Best Seller book, Life with My Sister Madonna. In 2012, he launched a footwear line, Ciccone Collection.

== Early life ==
Ciccone was born on November 22, 1960, in Pontiac, Michigan, to Catholic parents Madonna Louise Ciccone (née Fortin) and Silvio "Tony" Ciccone. His father's parents were Italian emigrants from Pacentro while his mother was of French-Canadian descent. His siblings were Anthony (1956–2023), Martin (born 1957), Madonna (born 1958), Paula (born 1959), and Melanie (born 1962). In 1963, Ciccone's mother died from breast cancer at age thirty. Their father remarried in 1966 to the family's housekeeper, Joan Gustafson (1943–2024), and had two more children: Jennifer (born 1968) and Mario (born 1969).

After graduating from high school, Ciccone attended Western Michigan University and then transferred to Oakland University where he took dance classes. In 1980, he began his career as a dancer with Le Groupe de La Place Royale in Ottawa.

== Career ==
In 1982, Christopher moved to New York City to support his sister Madonna's career as her backup dancer. Ciccone appeared in the music video for her single "Lucky Star" in 1984 and performed on her early television performances. Around this time, he worked at the Italian boutique, Fiorucci. Ciccone always had an interest in art and in 1984, he was hired as a receptionist at the Diane Brown Gallery in SoHo, Manhattan. As Madonna's fame grew and she embarked on arena tours, Ciccone was her "dresser". He created the artwork for the 12" version of her single "Like a Prayer" in 1989. Ciccone was the art director for Madonna's Blond Ambition World Tour in 1990. He also was the tour director for her The Girlie Show tour in 1993. Ciccone stated that Madonna demeaned and underpaid him throughout their working relationship.

Ciccone credited his sister with having encouraged him to keep painting, lending him $200,000 to buy a studio where he began to paint regularly. In November 1991, he had his first solo New York art show at the Wessel + O'Connor Fine Art gallery in SoHo. He exhibited seventeen paintings with prices starting at $3,500. He ventured into interior design when Madonna asked him to buy furniture for her new apartment in 1985. He also designed Madonna's Upper West Side apartment in Manhattan, which was featured on the cover of Architectural Digest in 1991. In 1994, Ciccone moved to Los Angeles where he indulged in the partying lifestyle and he began using cocaine. Ciccone directed the music video for Dolly Parton's single "Peace Train" and Tony Bennett's rendition of "God Bless the Child" in 1997. That year, he formed a friendship with actress Demi Moore and he was her date to the Gucci evening for AIDS Project LA.

In 2008, Ciccone released his autobiography, Life with My Sister Madonna, which debuted at No. 2 on The New York Times Best Seller list. The book fractured their relationship and Ciccone asserted that Madonna had him blacklisted from Hollywood. Ciccone also filmed a pilot for an interior design show called Pardon My Decor in 2008. He also made an appearance on the reality show, The Janice Dickinson Modeling Agency, to design a new sleeping quarter.

In September 2012, Ciccone debuted a footwear line, Ciccone Collection, during London Fashion Week. While doing press for his shoe collection, Ciccone revealed that he and Madonna are on "personable" terms. "We're back to being a brother and sister. I don't work for her, and it's better this way", he said.

== Personal life ==
Ciccone was openly gay. He stated that Madonna outed him in her interview with The Advocate in 1991. Their relationship became strained when she married English film director Guy Ritchie in 2000. According to Ciccone, he did not get along with Ritchie, who he claimed is homophobic. "It was...very apparent at the wedding in Scotland, just in the way that his friends made their toast with his gay references. I mean had it been any other word, you know Jew or a black person...anyone would find if [sic] offensive and I have a thick skin", said Ciccone. However, Ciccone's biggest rift with Madonna was over money. In addition, Madonna appointed a different director and choreographer, Jamie King, for her Drowned World Tour 2001 and did not tell Ciccone. During an interview with CBS News in 2012, Ciccone indicated they had patched things up, saying "Our relationship is fine as far as I'm concerned". He also told The Evening Standard, "We are in contact with each other".

Ciccone befriended actress Farrah Fawcett and they bonded over their love of art. They attended Vanity Fair's Oscar party together in 2002. Ciccone married British actor Ray Thacker in 2016.

=== Death ===
Ciccone died on October 4, 2024, in Petoskey, Michigan at age 63 from pancreatic cancer, according to a statement from his family. On October 6, Madonna dedicated a lengthy Instagram post to him saying, "I admired him [...] We found our way back to each other. I did my best to keep him alive as long as possible. He was in so much pain towards the end [...] There will never be anyone like him". Her 2026 album Confessions II includes the song "Fragile", which serves as a raw, emotional eulogy and homage to Ciccone, with lyrics addressing their shared childhood, public estrangement following his 2008 tell-all memoir, and their ultimate reconciliation on his deathbed.

== Bibliography ==
- Ciccone, Christopher; Leigh, Wendy (2008). Life with My Sister Madonna. London: Simon & Schuster. ISBN 978-1-847-3-74387.
