= Elio Fiorucci =

Italian fashion designer and businessperson

- Born: 10 June 1935; Milan, Kingdom of Italy
- Died: 19 July 2015 (aged 80); Milan, Italy
- Occupations: Fashion designer and retailer

Elio Fiorucci (Italian pronunciation: [ˈɛːljo fjoˈruttʃi]; 10 June 1935 – 19 July 2015) was an Italian fashion designer and the founder of the Fiorucci fashion label.

Beginning in retailing at the age of 14, he later created a fashion brand that had worldwide success during the 1970s and 1980s, including becoming a key label of the disco-scene. The retail environments he created were destinations, rather than simply places to buy clothes; his New York store was known by some as the daytime Studio 54 and gave space to artists and creatives – including Andy Warhol.

Fiorucci is credited with designing and popularising stretch jeans, and for transforming the fashion scene. Giorgio Armani described him as a revolutionary, adding: "He was always ready to take some risks to really understand his time".

== Early life and career ==
Elio Fiorucci was born in Milan and was one of six children, two of them boys. The family escaped to the countryside during the war, returning afterwards to continue running the family shoe shop and manufacturing business.

Fiorucci started working in his father's shop when he was 14, becoming a full-time worker there at 17. In 1962, Fiorucci created his first successful design – a brightly coloured waterproof overshoe. The design was featured in the Italian magazine Amica and earned him enough money to go travelling. His travels included a visit to London, then a hotbed of young fashion, and he was said to have been surprised and also influenced by the dynamic retailing approaches found in Carnaby Street and Kensington Market. Later he would say: "That creative chaos represented a new deal, free from the pressures of formal dressing and elegance".

== Launch of retail brand ==
After returning to Milan, he opened his first shop in 1967. This was located in the Galleria Passarella and targeted a much younger clientele than was typical for Italian retailing of the time. Fiorucci stocked London designers such as Ossie Clark, as well as the typical hippie uniform of Afghan coat. The store became an eclectic mix of eccentricities – everything from rag rugs and kettles to hair products and clothing. The interior of the store was designed by Amalia Del Ponte.

The exotic market-style approach he'd seen in Kensington Market was added to, with Fiorucci using the fashion inspiration he'd gained in his travels to places such as Mexico and Ibiza, as well as being inspired by the London scene.

He created his own label in 1970. While he was considerably older than his target market – the teenage and young shopper – he employed young fashion scouts internationally to report back on what young people were wearing and discover different products and designs that could be incorporated into his manufacturing. The distinctive logo he chose for Fiorucci was two less than saintly looking Victorian cherubs in sunglasses. The clothing he manufactured was affordable and often kitsch – such as bright coloured T-shirts featuring his trademark cherub motif or Disney characters.

The store was distinctively different and radical for the time and grew to become what Fiorucci himself would describe as: "an amusement park of novelties". A second store opened in Milan's Via Torino – it included a fast-food restaurant and became a place for young people to see and be seen. By this stage, Fiorucci had financial backing from the Montedison group.

== New York store ==
In 1976, the Fiorucci brand was taken to New York, with a retail store on East 59th Street. Its interior was part designed by Ettore Sottsass and it became part of the ascendent disco culture – the opening party was held at Studio 54 and Fiorucci chartered a jumbo jet to fly in his Italian guests. Like his Milan stores, this became a place for people to hang out and the store offered free espresso and music from resident DJs – it became known as the daytime Studio 54 because of the disco crowd that gathered there.

Fiorucci became friendly with Andy Warhol and gave him a free office in the store in order to set up Interview. Warhol described the store as fun, saying: "That's all I ever wanted, all plastic". Fiorucci and his brand were subjects of a book by Warhol's friend and chronicler of L.A. nightlife Eve Babitz. Fiorucci also offered wall space to artist Keith Haring and gave retail concessions to designers Anna Sui and Betsey Johnson. Famous patrons included Elizabeth Taylor, Jackie Onassis and Cher, and the teenage Marc Jacobs also spent time there.

=== Expansion and change of ownership ===
The expansion, which had begun in 1975, continued apace. By 1984, the brand had stores on London's King's Road and LA's Rodeo Drive, as well as branches in Sydney, Tokyo and Hong Kong. Its Milan store would attract up to 10,000 visitors on a Saturday at the peak of its success. For a while, Elio Fiorucci's reach appeared unstoppable – he said: "we were never wrong" – but he struggled to manage the company's financial affairs. In 1981 Benetton bought Montedison's share in the company, selling it on to Aknofin six years later. Also in 1986, the New York store was forced to close, followed by other international outlets and the company went into administration.

The Fiorucci label was sold to the Carrera jeans label, which sold it on in 1990 to the Japanese firm Edwin International. Fiorucci retained creative control under Edwin, but the relationship was not smooth. His original Fiorucci store in Milan closed in 2003. The New York store closed in the same year, having moved downtown and – in post 9/11 New York – become a space that sponsored and supported new artists. AndrewAndrew used the shop to launch their careers.

=== Later activities ===
After the Fiorucci brand, Elio Fiorucci launched a new fashion label Love Therapy, which included jeans, hoodies, clothes and accessories. Five years after its launch, a licensing deal was agreed with Coin Group, with both women's and children's ranges being sold in branches of the retailer Oviesse.

== Brand influence and legacy ==
It has been said that garments were the least important part of Fiorucci's success. Instead, it was the retail ambience and branding – he was an early adopter of the outrageous advertising campaign and even had the stickers for one monokini campaign seized by the Italian police.

His most significant introductions was in jeans, which he cut close to the body and to fit women's shape. From 1982, his denims incorporated lycra, and he also made jeans in other materials, including vinyl. The skintight – almost spray-on – look he created was said to have been inspired by the sight of women in Ibiza in wet jeans; Fiorucci, having noted that they fitted women's bodies better when wet, decided to recreate the effect, and his designs left little to the imagination.

He helped to popularise animal prints in 1970s and early '80s fashion – his trademark was leopard-print – although he himself was a vegetarian and never used leather in his jeans or other garments.

Fiorucci's influence on the disco scene was strong; his New York art director also styled the then rising star Madonna. Later, at the brand's 15th anniversary party in Studio 54, it was Madonna who agreed to jump out of the birthday cake. Fiorucci's brand had a name check – alongside Halston and Gucci – in the Bernard Edwards and Nile Rodgers song "He's the Greatest Dancer", a disco anthem sung by Sister Sledge.

An obituary on the BBC Radio 4 programme Last Word (first broadcast on 18 August 2015) interviewed fashion curator at the Victoria & Albert Museum Sonnet Stanfill, who suggested Elio Fiorucci helped to make fashion a lot less formal – transforming jeans into fashion that could be worn day or evening. She added that his design skills encompassed not just fashion but also retail environment and marketing materials, which combined to make the garments more compelling. Graphic designer Terry Jones suggested that his approach had a direct influence on fashion brands that followed, such as Dolce & Gabbana and Moschino.

Despite the flamboyance of the clothes and retail environments he created, Fiorucci's personal style was restrained – typically sweater and trousers – and he told WWD in 1976, in an interview about the opening of his Manhattan store that he was: "a merchant, not a man of fashion". He married twice and had three daughters.
