= Amalia Del Ponte =

Italian artist and designer (1936–2025)

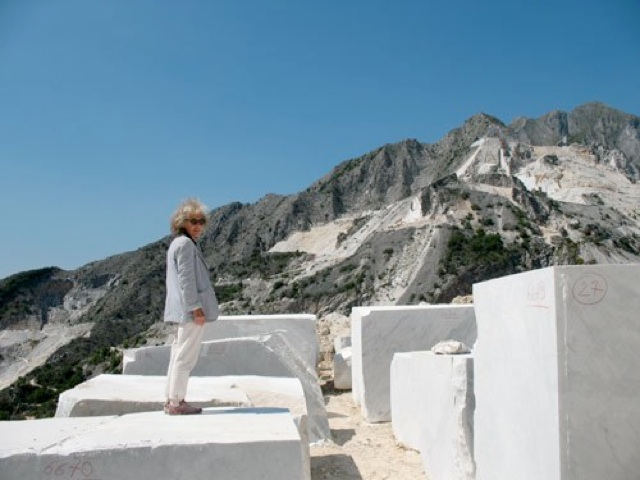
Amalia Del Ponte at Carrara quarry, Tuscany, Italy

Amalia Del Ponte (15 January 1936 – 16 August 2025) was an Italian visual artist and designer. Her work has been praised by critics and art historians such as Guido Ballo, Bruno Munari, Gillo Dorfles, Arturo Schwarz, Francesco Tedeschi, Flaminio Gualdoni, and Tommaso Trini. Del Ponte's work has been described as being suspended between art and science, through studies that investigate the relationship between sculpture, music, science, and technology. Her international debut in the 1970s won First Prize for Sculpture at the São Paulo Art Biennial.

== Early life and education ==
Del Ponte was born in Milan on 15 January 1936. Between 1956 and 1961 she studied sculpture under Marino Marini at the Accademia di Brera in Milan. Among her fellow students were Kengiro Azuma, Mario Robaudi and Gianni Colombo.

== Career ==
In 1965, Del Ponte made her first sculptures in Plexiglas, based on an analysis of basic geometric shapes. Two years later, Vittorio Fagone named these works Tropi during a solo show at Galleria Vismara in Milan. In the 1960s Del Ponte also designed the interiors of the fashion boutique Gulp! in Milan, and Elio Fiorucci's first shop.

Del Ponte received international acclaim in 1973 when she was invited by Bruno Munari and Umbro Apollonio to participate at the São Paulo Art Biennial, where she won First Prize for Sculpture with her work Area percettiva. In 1993, Del Ponte exhibited some of her lithophones at Fort Asperen in the Netherlands.

In 1995, Gillo Dorfles invited Del Ponte to participate at the 46th Venice Biennale, with a room dedicated to her work in the Italian pavilion. Here she exposed an original set-up of lithophones, described as "sound stones that point out the invisible correspondences between geometric shapes, musical scales and colors".

In 2010, she created a project for Certosa Island in the Lagoon of Venice; this was a series of video installations set up in the four Case Matte. The artwork, entitled Regno dei possibili, invisibili, is about how art and science make otherwise invisible reality visible.

== Death ==
Del Ponte died on 16 August 2025, at the age of 89.
