= Museo nazionale d'arte medievale e moderna della Basilicata =

Museum in Matera, Basilicata, Italy

Palazzo Lanfranchi
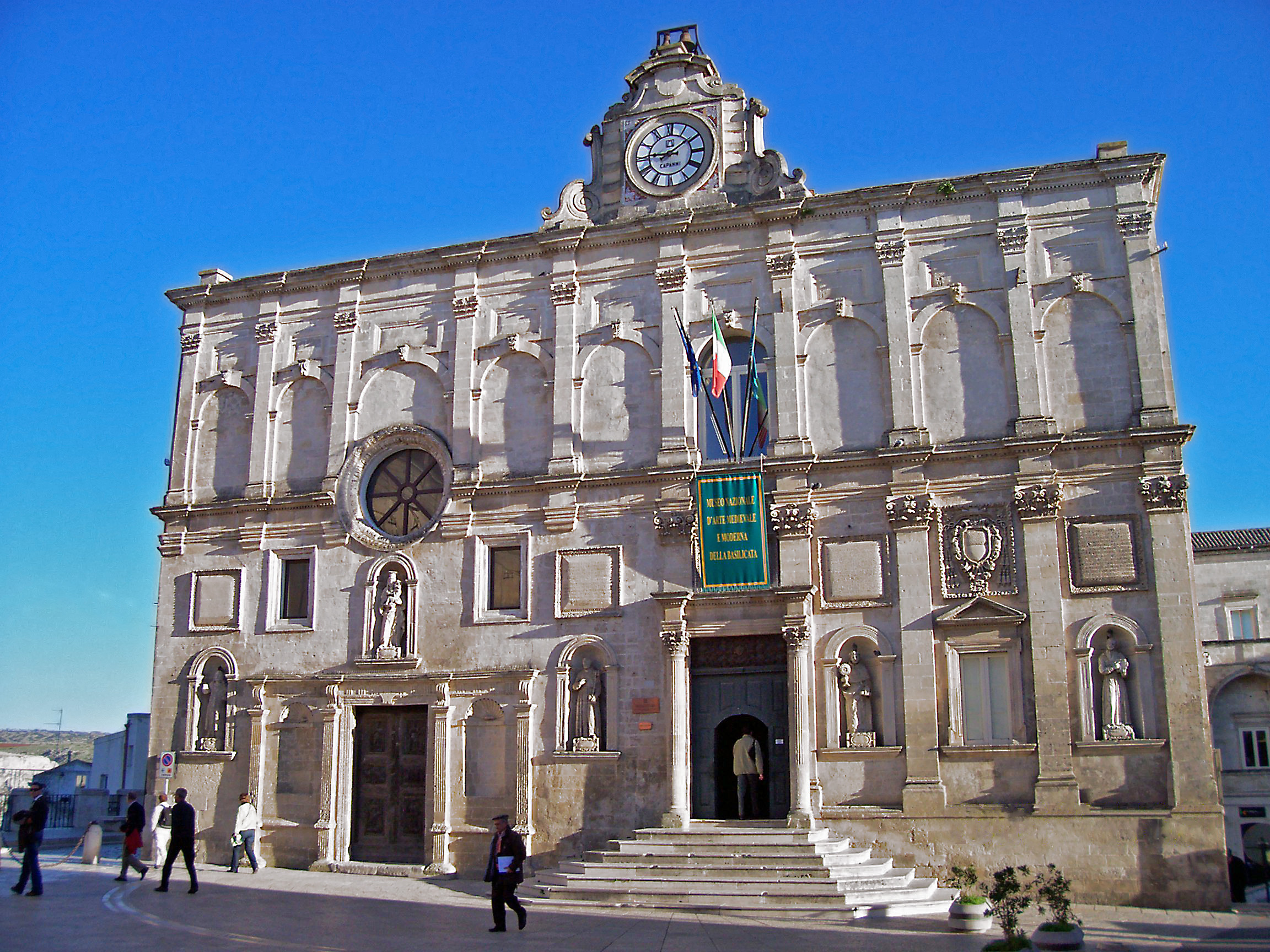
- The entrance of Palazzo Lanfranchi
- Location: Matera, Italy
- Coordinates: 40.662830°N 16.610441°E
- Type: Art museum, Design/Textile Museum, Historic site
- Website: www.beniculturali.it

The Museo nazionale d'arte medievale e moderna della Basilicata (pronounced [pa'lattso laɱ'fraŋki]) is an art museum located inside the building Palazzo Lanfranchi, which is located in Piazzetta Pascoli, in the Historic Centre of Matera Basilicata, Italy. In front of the entrance, a sculpture by artist Kengiro Azuma titled La Goccia is exhibited.

In the past, the building that now hosts the museum - Palazzo Lanfranchi - used to be a seminary and, starting from 1864, it became the seat of the high school Liceo ginnasio Emanuele Duni, which now is located uptown.

== See also ==
- Matera
- Basilicata
- Liceo ginnasio Emanuele Duni
