= Liceo ginnasio statale Emanuele Duni =

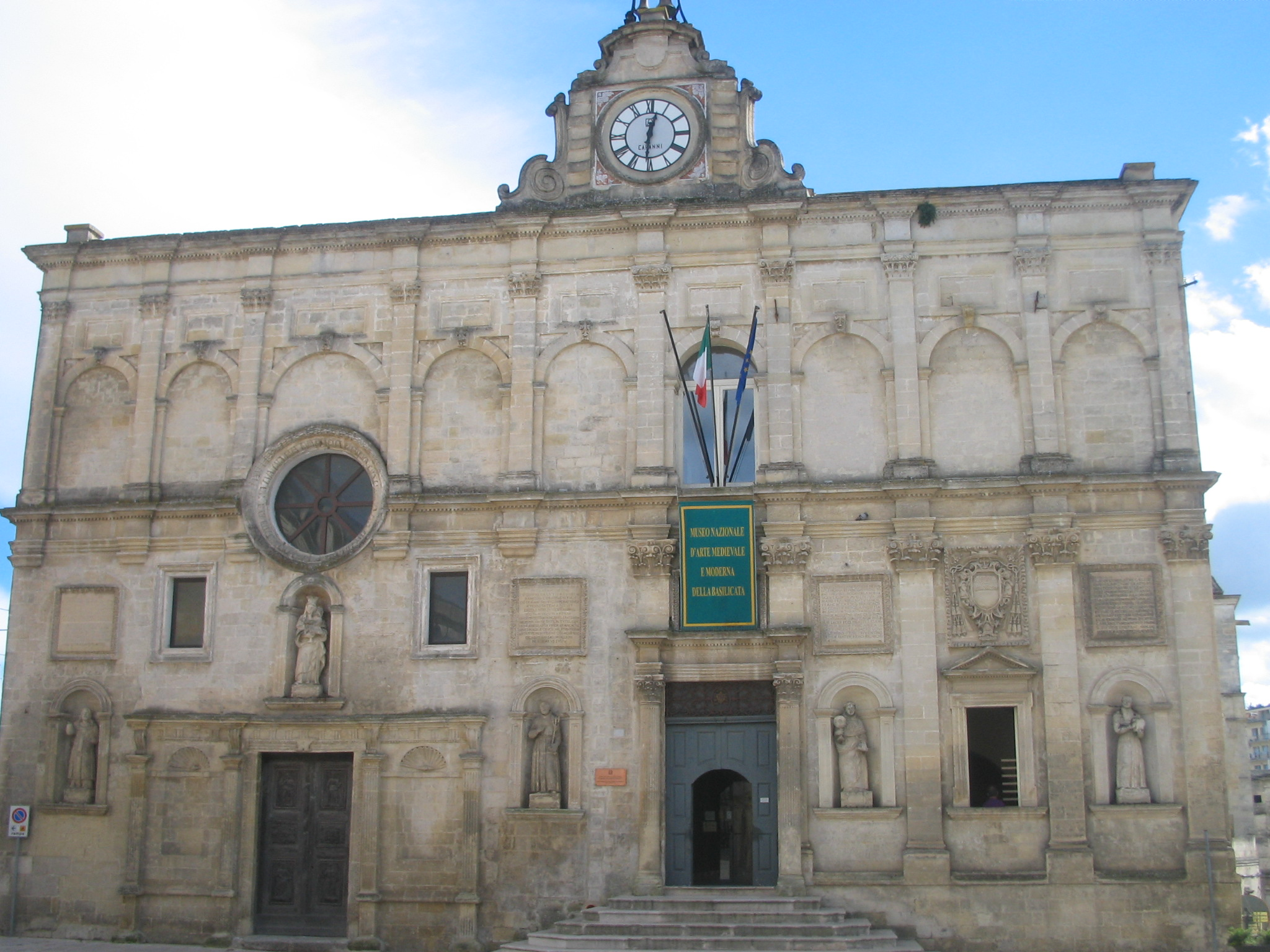
- Palazzo Lanfranchi, the former location of the school

Location
- Matera; Italy
- Coordinates: 40.665827°N 16.597448°E

Information
- Established: 6 November 1864
- Principal: Patrizia Di Franco
- Website: www.dunilevimatera.edu.it

The Liceo ginnasio Emanuele Duni is an Italian high school located in Matera, in the region of Basilicata in Southern Italy. It is named after Italian philosopher Emanuele Duni, professor of canon and civil law at the University of Rome. It is best known for having been the school where the Italian poet Giovanni Pascoli worked as a teacher in the two-year period 1882–1884.

== List of denominations ==
- Regio liceo ginnasio di Matera, 1864–1868
- Liceo ginnasio comunale Emanuele Duni di Matera, 1869–1875
- Liceo ginnasio pareggiato Emanuele Duni di Matera, 1875–1881
- Regio liceo ginnasio Emanuele Duni di Matera, 1882–1904

In 2015 it took the name I.I.S. E.Duni-C.Levi, thus becoming an IIS Istituto d'Istruzione Superiore by merging with the school Liceo artistico Carlo Levi.

== Notable people ==
Among the most famous teachers are the poet Giovanni Pascoli, who taught there between 1882 and 1884, the philologist and literary critic Antonio Restori, the archaeologist Giuseppe Botti, the poet, writer and literary critic Giuseppe Lipparini, the geographer Arcangelo Ghisleri, the journalist Paolo Orano, the philosopher Vito Fazio Allmayer, the writer and literary critic Gioacchino Brognoligo. Among others, that graduated; the literary critic Giuseppe De Robertis, the philosopher and historian of philosophy Eustachio Paolo Lamanna, the classical philologist Nicola Festa, the painter Luigi Guerricchio, the anthropologist Giovanni Battista Bronzini, the academician and partisan Giambattista Salinari, the poet Michele Rigillo, the Greek scholar and Latin scholar Vincenzo D'Addozio (Chief of Staff of the Ministry of Education). Rocco Montano literary critic and Dantist, among the students and teachers.

== Seat ==
Today the school has a new location since the 1960s but originally it was located in Palazzo Lanfranchi, which was home to the former Lanfranchian seminary, transformed into a Regio liceo ginnasio and it also included the Convitto Nazionale. The school also gave the name to the road that led to it (Via Liceo). In 2018, the site was declared uninhabitable. It was temporarily moved to the Agricultural Institute of Matera for a short period, and then it was moved into the University of Basilicata, located in via Castello.

== Radium in the school ==
During the academic year 2003–2004, the high school rose to the forefront of Italian newspapers and television news due to the presence of radioactive material. An employee of a nearby university had brought a Geiger counter to the school for demonstration purposes. This object, during a demonstration, began to signal the presence of a radioactive source inside the school that was later discovered to be a sample of 226 radium contained in the school's ancient collection of scientific instruments, which was located on the top floor.
