= Tish Weinstock =

English beauty editor and writer

Tish Weinstock is an English beauty editor and writer. She was an editorial assistant at I-D from 2014 to 2016 and then beauty features editor at Dazed, and then from 2020 to 2022, at Vogue.

== Early life and education ==
Weinstock grew up in South Kensington and Wiltshire, where her family spent the weekends. She has two older sisters. Her father Simon Weinstock was a leading member of the General Electric Company and an active owner and breeder of racehorses. Her grandfather was industrialist and businessman Arnold Weinstock. When she was 5 years old, her father died.

Weinstock attended Westminster School. She has a BA in Art History, Criticism and Conservation from the University of Oxford.

== Career ==
Weinstock had internships at Tank, Garage, Vanity Fair, and I-D magazine, the latter under the mentorship of Holly Shackleton. She was an editorial assistant at I-D from 2014 to 2016. She then became the beauty features editor at Dazed and beauty director at System magazine. From 2020 to 2022, she was beauty editor for Vogue Global Network. She was the acting digital beauty editor at British Vogue, where she is currently a contributing beauty editor.

Weinstock has modeled for a number of brands including Chloé, Saks Potts, Conner Ives, Maison Margiela, and Vivienne Westwood.

In 2024, Weinstock published her debut book How to Be a Goth: Notes on Undead Style about the origins and history of gothic style. The book also serves as a memoir, detailing Weinstock's childhood, including the death of her father and its effect on her and her family. She was introduced to goth culture partly from 1990s teen culture, including the films The Craft and The Crow.

The book has its roots in a story Weinstock wrote for British Vogue about Morticia Addams. It was also inspired by How to Be a Woman by Caitlin Moran and Luella’s Guide to English Style by Luella Bartley. She wrote the book while pregnant during the summer of 2023. She believes the death of her father and the subsequent grieving period when she was young perhaps "internalised" a certain "macabre-ness, morbidity" and an "interest and preoccupation with death and darkness."

In September 2025, Weinstock started writing a health column for W Magazine.

== Personal life ==
Weinstock is married to model and stylist Tom Guinness, a member of the Guinness family. They married at Belvoir Castle over Halloween weekend in 2022. The dress code was "black tie gothic." The castle was designed by the neo-Gothic architect James Wyatt. Her wedding dress, based on the style of Morticia Addams, was made from pieces of antique lace and included a 1930s style veil.

Weinstock and her husband have two children. They live between London and Wiltshire.
