= Alice Naylor-Leyland =

English socialite, brand collaborator, writer and business owner

- Born: March 30, 1986 (age 40); Switzerland
- Occupations: writer, creative collaborator
- Spouse: Thomas Philip Naylor-Leyland (m. 2011)
- Children: 4
- Parent(s): Serena Fresson (mother); Paul Dawson (father)

Alice Naylor-Leyland (née Dawson; born March 30, 1986) is an English socialite, brand collaborator, writer and business owner.

== Early life ==
Naylor-Leyland was born in Switzerland and is the daughter of Paul Dawson and Serena Fresson. Naylor-Leyland grew up in London and went to Garden House Day School. Her parents divorced when she was two months old and she was raised by her mother, who is from Melbourne, Australia. She spent holidays with her father in Switzerland. She attended Heathfield School, a boarding school in Ascot. She studied history at Edinburgh University and fashion at Istituto Marangoni in London. Her mother later remarried and Naylor-Leyland took up residence in her stepfather's London hotel, 11 Cadogan Gardens.

== Career ==
Naylor-Leyland runs her own blog, Mrs.Alice, focusing on fashion, lifestyle, and motherhood. Her Instagram has over 110,000 followers. She is a contributing editor for American Vogue and Harper's Bazaar, writing articles on fashion, travel and lifestyle. In 2017 Naylor-Leyland partnered with Aerin Lauder to create a limited edition perfume called Garden Rose Eau de Cologne, inspired by Naylor-Leyland's rose garden. She has designed two shoe collections for the company French Sole.

She also works as a brand collaborator with fashion brands like Tory Burch and Smythson.

Her interior design has been featured in Architectural Digest.

In November 2019 she launched her own interiors and tablescaping brand Mrs Alice in partnership with her mother Serena Fresson. The brand has collaborated on collections with a number of high profile designers and individuals including Marie Chantal of Greece, Tish Weinstock, Poppy Delevingne and Erin O'Connor.

== Personal life ==
Naylor-Leyland met her husband, Thomas Philip Naylor-Leyland, who is the son and heir of Sir Philip Naylor-Leyland, 4th Baronet, through their mutual friend Francis Richard Charteris, Lord Elcho, the son of James Charteris, 13th Earl of Wemyss, when she was seventeen years old at a party in Gloucestershire. They started dating when she was 21 and married when she was 24. They have four children: Billy, Nancy, Felix and Margot. Her husband is the heir to his father's baronetcy and estates, Nantclwyd Hall and Milton Hall. The couple currently reside at Stibbington House in Cambridgeshire, and a flat in Chelsea, London. Naylor-Leyland oversaw the renovation and restoration of Stibbington House, which has been in her husband's family since the 1970s.
