= Terry Jones (i-D) =

British artist and editor

Terry Jones MBE
- Born: 2 September 1945 (age 81); Northampton, England
- Education: West of England College of Art
- Occupations: Graphic designer; photographer; author
- Years active: 1968–present
- Spouse: Tricia Jones (m. 1968)
- Children: Kayt Jones; Matthew Jones

Terry Jones MBE (born 2 September 1945) is a British graphic designer, art director, photographer, book- and magazine-editor. He is best known as co-founder of the iconic British, street-style magazine i-D in 1980.

== Early life and career ==
Terry Jones was born on 2 September 1945 in Northampton, England. He was a student of commercial art at West of England College of Art in Bristol, applying to the course after his mother mentioned the West of England College of Art was interviewing for new students. Jones however did not have a portfolio, only a few works, so Jones had "to produce 6 pieces of work that night and they wanted to see 12 and I managed to scrape together 9."

During college Jones was already working on two magazines: Circuit and Hip Hip Bullshit Dip. At college, he began to experiment with silk screens for his layouts and collage works, which cultivated and sparked his life long defining design aesthetic of 'hand graphics' in his work. After his first two-year diploma, he was persuaded by the head of graphics Richard Hollis to continue studies, but soon after he left without a grade in solidarity to Hollis who had resigned due to a lack of support from the school. Hollis suggested Jones should apply to the Royal College of Art, but being reluctant during the interview he wasn't accepted.

Jones then worked as an assistant to the graphic designer Ivan Dodd. Terry states that working for Ivan allowed him to "to learn and experiment" whilst allowing him to "try and give as much knowledge and guidance as I could". This is where Terry had his first initial experiences with commercial magazines, cultivating his own signature design practice through layout and type. He states the reactions from colleagues were often surprised by his design style: " People would freak out! You want to use FIVE typfaces?! I’d say you can only use Univers and then we’d run it through the photocopier and completely distort it. There was what I’d call ‘guest typography’."

Terry then became assistant art director at Good Housekeeping, from 1968 until 1970, and art director for Vanity Fair from 1970 until 1971.

== British Vogue ==
From 1972 until 1977 Terry was the art director for British Vogue. Terry was present at the magazine under the direction of then-editor, Beatrix Miller, stating: "Beatrix Miller was amazing. She let me get away with breaking all sorts of rules – covers, notoriously." One of his most notorious covers was the "Green Jelly one" from February 1977. Created by Terry and Grace Coddington and shot by Willie Christie, the cover was deemed adventurous for the time – even for today. Terry has admitted in an interview with SHOWstudio that the cover was nearly taken off the press, even after it had been approved by Vogue's board at the time (which included Terry Jones, Beatrix Miller and the-then managing director of British Vogue).

In 1977 Jones had commissioned the photographer Steve Johnston for a head-to-toe-portrait series of punk youth on London's King's Road. The series was considered too radical for publication in BritishVogue, so Jones used it for his book Not Another Punk Book (Aurum Press). This kind of documentary approach to fashion photography, then labelled the Straight-up, became one of the trade marks of Terry Jones' own upcoming publication i-D.

Terry Jones worked as a freelancer all over Europe until 1979, as a consultant for the German edition of Vogue, for the magazines Donna, with photographer Oliviero Toscani and Sportswear Europe, for selected issues of Italian Vogue, as well as a creative director for the Italian fashion label, Fiorucci. He also designed and edited books, worked on advertising campaigns, and is credited as graphic designer and photographer on several record covers.

== i-D ==
Following the publishing of Not Another Punk Book and seeing that no magazines took street style seriously, Jones pitched the template for what would later become i-D to Donna publisher Flavio Lucini. Jones stated in that “He told me that there would be no interest in that,” Jones said. “He said it wouldn’t sustain commercially.” Undeterred, Jones funded his new venture himself, at around the same time that its spiritual sister publications The Face and Blitz also took off.

In 1980 Terry Jones, his wife Tricia Jones, and Blitz kid Perry Haines officially founded the magazine i-D. Starting as a hobby, the concept of i-D is "simple" states Jones, stating "The fact that the story had to come from the subject who was being photographed. I think that that was a simple idea that you could exchange. That if, someone looked interesting or like-minded, you could ask them “Where should I go and get a sandwich or whatever”... It was like a club you could belong to." Terry describes the ethos of the magazine embodying a "do it yourself" attitude to fashion and self-expression, rather than have a fashion magazine dictate what you could wear. It was the time when post-punk, club life, and the music scene were all coming together. The first issue was hand-stapled photocopies in the style of a fanzine with little distribution, however over the years i-D developed to one of the most influential style and culture magazines, not just reporting on the cultural shifts and trends but creating them. fashion magazine with global impact, while still keeping its cutting-edge view on fashion and youth culture.

i-D became responsible for producing some of the most iconic and innovative fashion imagery for the period. Terry discovered and commissioned work by up-and-coming photographers, many whose successful photographic careers began at i-D. These photographers include Juergen Teller, Wolfgang Tillmans, Donald Milne, Mark Alesky, Normski, Stefan Ruiz, Mark Borthwick, Glen Luchford, David Sims, Mark Lebon. Additional collaborators such as John Galliano, Kate Moss, Judy Blame, Alexander McQueen, Helmut Lang, Franz Ferdinand, Chloe Sevigny, Raf Simons, Undercover, Veronique Branquinho, Lily Cole, Giles Deacon, Dizzee Rascal, Scarlett Johansson, Rick Owens and Tadanabu Asano are amongst those who appeared first in i-D.amung many others. i-D also gave Madonna her first cover in March 1984, as well as Sade in 1983.

Besides of the abbreviation for 'identity', the name i-D' refers to 'Informat Design', Terry Jones' studio, later on re-branded as 'Instant Design'. Jones states that the ethos of the magazine is founded in this idea of "creating your own rules", going beyond the clothes and investigating how fashion is used as the way of communicating to give an insight of your interests." Terry states, "It was always the coding of fashion which I liked...People choose what they’re going to wear to go to work or to decide ‘this is who I am’ to reflect who that personality is."

Throughout the course of his editorship, Jones was responsible for cultivating and teaching upcoming British fashion journalist talent including that of Edward Enninfel and Dylan Jones. Terry along with his collaborators have stated that working on the magazine was like working "like a family." The magazine grew over the years, evolving out of its humble beginnings in the 'fanzine' style, and emerging into the most respected fashion and culture bible. In 1984 Jones enlisted the help of Time Out publisher Tony Elliott to turn i-D into a more commercial newsstand product. In 1996, after several years spent concentrating on advertising art direction, Jones decided to take a more hands-on approach to i-D, and subsequently steered the design-led monthly back towards fashion, while retaining a puckish, punkish originality in style and content, throwing material together quickly in the manner of a low-budget film. In the 90's, Terry made a concerted effort to move i-D into the new decade with an emphasis on social, political and environmental issues. Terry began consulting for Esprit, and along with owner Doug Thompkins, similarly brought this environmental consciousness to the consumer market, rare for brands at the time.

Jones is author and editor of books related to the magazine like i-D Covers 1980–2010 (2010), SMILE i-D: Fashion and Style: the Best from 20 Years of i-D (2001), SOUL i-D (2008), or i-DENTITY: An Exhibition Celebrating 25 Years of i-D (2006); as well as a curator of travelling exhibitions, and furthermore running a (probably now defunct) record label under the eponymous name. Terry also famously collaborated with Dennis Morris to create the infamous 'PiL' logo for Public Image.

Terry has also curated and designed the travelling Smilei-D and i-Dentity exhibitions, celebrating i-D's rich history and taking place in cities such as Buenos Aires, Hong Kong, London, Milan, Moscow, New York, Paris and Tokyo. With Tricia as curator, Terry also designed the travelling SOUL i-D exhibition, recently held in Beijing in October 2012.

=== The "i-D Wink" ===
Terry has always said that "'i-D' should be recognised as the first 'emoticon'; at least three years before [the first] claims made in 1983." The original "i-D" logo was painted by hand and was based on the typeface "Futura Demi Bold" and was modified to fit into the i-D star logo so the dot of the lower case 'i' could be split into two semi-circles. This was three years before Terry bought his first computer: an Apple IIe.

== Awards ==
In 2013 at the British Fashion Awards Terry and Tricia Jones were honoured with the "Outstanding Achievement Award" for their work on i-D.

== Other ==
In 1980 Jones and Perry Haines directed the video "Careless Memories" for the band Duran Duran.

== Publications ==
(as author or editor, and graphic designer)

- The Tree with John Fowles, and Frank Horvat (1979)
- Women on Women (1979)
- Not Another Punk Book (1980)
- Private Viewing: Contemporary Erotic Photography (1983)
- Getting Jobs in Graphic Design (1989)
- i-Deas of a Decade (1990)
- Wink instant design: a manual of graphic techniques (1990)
- Family Future Positive with Tony Elliott (1985)
- Catching The Moment (1997)
- SMILEi-D: Fashion and Style: the Best from 20 Years of i-D (2001)
- Fashion Now with Susie Rushton (2003, paperback edition 2006)
- i-DENTITY: An Exhibition Celebrating 25 Years of i-D (2006)
- Fashion Now 2 with Susie Rushton (2005, paperback edition 2008)
- SOUL i-D (2008)
- i-D Covers 1980–2010 (2010)
- SOUL i-D: Chinese Edition (2012)
- Vivienne Westwood (2012)
- Yohji Yamamoto (2012)
- 100 Contemporary Fashion Designers (2013)
- Rei Kawakubo (2013)
- Rick Owens (2013)
- Raf Simons (2013)

== Exhibitions ==
- Family Future Positive (1995, London)
- 2001 minus 3 (1998, at Florence Biennale)
- Beyond Price (1999ff)
- SMILEi-D (2001ff)
- i-DENTITY: An Exhibition Celebrating 25 Years of i-D (Fashion & Textile Museum, London, São Paulo Fashion Week, Chelsea Art Museum New York, Cultural Centre Hong Kong, Spiral Hall Tokyo, Long March Space Beijing) (2006ff)
- Soul i-D (2008)
- Soul i-D: Beijing (2012)

== Personal life ==
Terry Jones was born in 1945, Northampton. Moved with his mother and his sister Mavis Elizabeth (born 1946) to the countryside in the West Country. His father, an RAF soldier, left the family before Mavis Elizabeth was born. In 1962 Terry attended Art School in Bristol.

In 1968 Terry Jones married Tricia. They have two children, Kayt Jones and Matthew Jones, who both are working as photographers. The Jones' reside in Wales and Somerset.
