= AndrewAndrew =

- Years active: 1999 — 2019

AndrewAndrew was a persona invented and rigorously maintained by two New York-based performance artists, Andrew and Andrew. Best known for being among the first DJs to use the iPod, and later the iPad, to let the crowd (at notable venues such as APT and Riff Raff) control the music, the Andrews also reviewed theater for Paper magazine, and they were fashion designers. Respect Me, their first fashion line (2000-2003), consisted of items that crossed fashion with performance art: sticky Respect Me labels attached surreptitiously to clothes at Old Navy and H&M; Respect Me labels hand-sewn into clothing at Barneys and Fiorucci; and a gold-plated security-tag pin. In 2014 they collaborated with Target Optical to produce the AndrewAndrew eyewear collection.

The Andrews' eccentric lifestyle garnered considerable media attention, notably in the hit HBO series Girls. They dressed exactly alike at all times and for seven years ate exactly the same foods. They refused to discuss anything they did before they met in 1999, and they required journalists to agree not to reveal their last names or places of birth. Their radical collaboration was the subject of a New York Times profile in 2011; they have also been featured in various books, including Joshua Wolf Shenk's Powers of Two (2014).
