= Vito Fazio-Allmayer =

Italian philosopher, pedagogist and university teacher

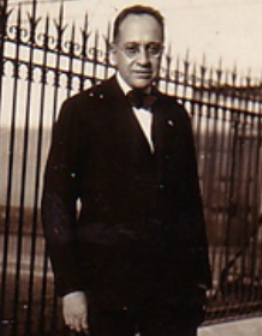
- Vito Fazio-Allmayer

Vito Fazio-Allmayer (Palermo, 21 November 1885 – Pisa, 14 April 1958) was an Italian philosopher, pedagogist and university teacher, an exponent of the idealistic era in Italy.

== Biography ==
He was born in Palermo and his parents were Giuseppe Emanuele Fazio, originally from Alcamo (ex Garibaldian and working at the national museum in Palermo) and Felicina Allmayer, of German origin but resident in Italy. Since his boyhood he was interested in the history of art; when he was 23 he graduated in Jurisprudence, but as he was fond of philosophy, he soon started philosophical studies and attended the philosophical library of Palermo, where he met Giovanni Gentile.

In 1910 Allmayer graduated in philosophy and started his career as teacher: in 1914 he moved to the Liceo "Umberto I" in Palermo, where he started his rich essayistic production that made him famous in Italy. His career continued in Rome; soon after the fall of Fascism, in November 1943, Vito Fazio-Allmayer was suspended from teaching and reintegrated after the end of the war.

After a difficult period of his life, in the 1950s he resumed his multifarious activity of essayist and critic, besides teaching.

In 1915 he had married Concettina Carta, whom he had three children with. After being widowed in 1953 he remarried Bruna Boldrini, who has been among Fazio's greatest critics and promoted a complete edition of his works (I-XXII, Firenze 1969–1991).

Fazio, who had had a heart attack three years before, died in Pisa in 1958.

In memory of this eminent philosopher and pedagogue, originally from Alcamo, the Lyceum specializing in Human Sciences, Social Economy, Foreign Languages and Music (Liceo "Vito Fazio Allmayer" con indirizzo Pedagogico, Economico-sociale, Linguistico e Musicale) in Alcamo has been dedicated to him.

=== Career ===
- 1910: professor at liceo of Matera.
- 1911: professor at liceo of Agrigento, in the same year he won a scholarship for training at the University of Rome.
- 1914 teacher at liceo "Umberto I" of Palermo
- 1918: university lecturer of History of Philosophy in Rome
- 1919: transferred to Palermo, he was co-director of Giornale critico della filosofia italiana, founded by Giovanni Gentile and directed by him before being a Minister.
- 1921–1922: professor of philosophy at the university of Palermo
- 1922–1924: professor of History of Philosophy (with courses on Bacon and Sophists and Plato) at the University of Rome, in substitution of Gentile and lecturer of pedagogy at the Faculty of Education of Rome.
- 1924: collaborator of Gentile for the school reform, with the function of central inspector of secondary schools, with the task of writing the programs of the lower secondary school.
- 1925: precarious teacher of the history of medioeval and modern philosophy.
- 1929: got the chair of theoretical philosophy in substitution of Pantaleo Carabellese.
- 1939: Head of the Department of Letters.
- 1925–1931: commissioner for the extraordinary administration of the section decorative arts, annexed to the Artistic and Industrial School of Palermo.
- Since 1931: government commissioner for Art schools.
- 1943: suspended from teaching and reintegrated after the end of war.
- 1951: chair of History of Philosophy of the University of Pisa.
- 1954: director of the Institute of philosophy.

== Philosophical thought ==
The end of Positivism, and the friendship with Gentile, took him to an ideological engagement in favour of Actual idealism that seemed it would take a cultural and civil renovation; according to Actual idealism it was the act of thinking, which reduces matter to subjective sensation, which defines reality. For him, this did not mean confining the subject within a closed system, but rather a moral openness to the individual empirical beings who represent the making of the subject itself.

Together with Giovanni Gentile and Guido De Ruggiero, he was one of the supporters of that Actual idealism which "had all the romantic seduction and all the optimistic confidence of attracting...the best dissatisfied young people, those not moving towards D'Annunzio or Marinetti", and in 1914–15 he openly sustained, even with lectures, Italy's intervention in the world war, but he was declared unfit at the military visit.

Bruna Boldrini, the philosopher's wife, who tried to outline the substantial autonomy of Fazio from Gentile's metaphysics, affirmed that Fazio-Allmayer arrives to justify the historical experience as concrete life, in which the manifold and different forms flow into an intersubjective relationship, ethical-aesthetic synthesis, into the specicifity of each one (p. 35).

On the other hand, since 1922 even Benedetto Croce, in a review of the essay Contributo alla teoria della storia dell'arte (later in Opere, IV, pp. 103–113), put in doubt that we could still speak of actual idealism in Fazio.

In the second post-war, in a denigratory moment of idealism, and mostly of Actual idealism, accused of connivance with Fascism, Fazio's position was one of open defence of Actual idealism and a faithful development of his own thought.

=== Teaching is not dying ===
Teaching is not dying, but entering a life process preceding us and following us over time: on this certainty of Vito and Bruna Fazio-Allmayer, it is based a pedagogic drive of Socratic kind, therefore the master feels a man among men, being more expert, while they are younger, but tending towards the new.

The educator, in his becoming a person, turns into the historian of himself, in the relationship with his pupils he must acknowledge them in their individuality, rather than level them off. Opening to others is the contribution to living: as this sense of solidarity fails with everything, we will have the bother of anguish inside us.

So the meaning of life is that of hope and love: the other individuals are not antithetical to their ego, but a necessary development of their ego. Each one of us becomes compossible with others for what he gives and what he take back from others, so the particular results in the universality and this one in the particular.

Owing to Vito Fazio-Allmayer, hope is in the certainty that future is in the present: therefore old teachers are those that, taken from the past, find contemptible everything is produced in the present, and young people are stupid, and all new thoughts are wrong. Old school cannot see the new world and its renovating; the teacher who withdraws in the memories of past, shows the mortal disease called old age.

=== Foundation ===
The Fondazione Nazionale "Vito Fazio-Allmayer was created in Palermo in 1975, by Fanny Giambalvo and Bruna Fazio-Allmayer, who came to Sicily from Tuscany to teach ethics and history of Pedagogy; this institution was founded to honour his husband's memory and arise interest in philosophy by the new generations.

== Works ==
- On: La Sicile illustrée, articoli e saggi (1905–1908)
- On: Rassegna d'arte, articoli e saggi (1905–1908)
- Studi sul pensiero antico; Sansoni, 1974
- Galileo Galilei; R. Sandron, 1911
- Galileo Galilei, Palermo 1912, poi in Opere, X, pp. 51–209;
- Galileo Galilei; Sansoni, 1975
- Novum organum: Bacon, Francis; Laterza & Figli, 1912
- Dell'anima Aristoteles; Laterza, 1912
- la formazione del problema kantiano, in Annali della Bibl. filosofica di Palermo, 1912, fasc. I, pp. 43–89, poi in Opere, IV, pp. 191–235)
- La scuola popolare e altri discorsi ai maestri: 1912 e 1913; Francesco Battiato, 1914
- Introduzione allo studio della storia della filosofia; Zanichelli; 1921
- Materia e sensazione (Sandron, Palermo 1913, poi in Opere, II)
- Materia e sensazione; Sansoni, 1969
- Introduzione alla filosofia; Sansoni, 1970
- La teoria della libertà nella filosofia di Hegel (Messina 1920, poi in Opere, XIV)
- Saggio su Francesco Bacone (Palermo 1928, poi in Opere, XI)
- Saggio su Francesco Bacone; 1979
- Il problema morale come problema della costituzione del soggetto, e altri saggi (Firenze, Le Monnier, 1942, poi in Opere, IV, pp. 952)
- Il problema morale come problema della costituzione del soggetto e altri saggi; Sansoni, 1971
- Il significato della vita; Sansoni, 1955
- Il significato della vita; 1988
- Divagazioni e capricci su Pinocchio; G.C. Sansoni, 1958
- Divagazioni e capricci su Pinocchio; Fondazione nazionale Vito Fazio-Allmayer, 1989
- Ricerche hegeliane; G. C. Sansoni, 1959
- Ricerche hegeliane; Fondazione nazionale Vito Fazio-Allmayer, 1991
- Storia della filosofia; G.B. Palumbo, 1942
- Storia della filosofia; Sansoni, 1981
- I vigenti programmi della scuola elementare: Commento e interpretazione; Firenze, F. Le Monnier, 1954
- Morale e diritto; Sansoni, 1955
- Discorsi, lezioni; Sansoni, 1983
- Saggi e problemi; Sansoni, 1984
- Recensioni e varie, 1986
- La Pinacoteca del Museo di Palermo e altri saggi; notizie dei pittori palermitani, Palermo 1908
- Prolusioni e discorsi inaugurali; Sansoni, 1969
- Alcune lezioni edite e inedite; Sansoni, 1982
- Alcune lezioni edite e inedite; Sansoni, 1983
- Spunti di storia della pedagogia
- Moralita dell'arte: rievocazione estetica e rievocazione suggestiva (con 53 postille); Sansoni, 1953
- Moralita dell'arte e altri saggi; Sansoni. 1972
- Logica e metafisica; Sansoni, 1973
- La storia; Sansoni, 1973
- Lettere a Bruna; Fondazione nazionale Vito Fazio-Allmayer, 1992
- Lettere a Gentile; Fondazione nazionale Vito Fazio-Allmayer, 1993
- Introduzione allo studio della storia della filosofia e della pedagogia; Sansoni, 1979
- La teoria della liberta' nella filosofia di Hegel; Giuseppe Principato, 1920
- Opere; Sansoni, 1969
- Commento a Pinocchio; G. C. Sansoni, 1945
- Il problema Pirandello; Firenze, Belfagor, 1957

== See also ==
- Actual idealism
- Giovanni Gentile
- Guido De Ruggiero
- Alcamo

== Sources ==
- "FAZIO-ALLMAYER, Vito in "Dizionario Biografico"". treccani.it.
- "Fondazione "Vito Fazio-Allmayer"". fazio-allmayer.it.
- Vita e pensiero di V. F., Firenze 1960; 2 ediz., Palermo 1975, con bibliografia degli scritti del e sul F., alle pp. 205–224;
- A. Massolo: Fazio e la logica della compossibilità, in Giornale critico della filosofia italiana, XXXVI (1957), pp. 478–487;
- C. Luporini, Ricordo di V. F., in Belfagor, XIII (1958), pp. 360 s.;
- Giardina Francesco: Intenzionalità ermeneutica e compossibilità nell'attualismo comunicazionale di Vito Fazio-Allmayer: implicazioni pedagogiche; Edizioni della Fondazione nazionale Vito Fazio-Allmayer - 1996
- A. Guzzo, V. F. e Guido Rossi, in Filosofia, IX (1958), pp. 494–499;
- Giornale critico della filosofia italiana, XXXVII (1958), pp. 425–465 (scritti di G. Saitta, A. Massolo, S. Caramella, F. Albeggiani, M. F. Mineo Fazio, B. Fazio-Allmayer Boldrini);
- A. Santucci: Esistenzialismo e filosofia italiana, Bologna 1959, pp. 169 s.;
- A. Negri, In ricordo di V. F., in Filosofia, XIII (1962), pp. 527–530;
- E. Garin, Cronache di filosofia italiana ... , I-II, Bari 1966, ad Indicem;
- B. Fazio-Allmayer: Esistenza e realtà nella fenomenologia di V. F., Bologna 1968;
- L. Sichirollo, Filosofia e storia nella più recente evoluzione di F., in Per una storiografia filosofica, II, Urbino 1970, pp. 461–484;
- E. Giambalvo, La metafisica come esigenza in Bergson e l'esigenza della metafisica in V. F., Palermo 1972;
- Carlo Sini: Studi e prospettive sul pensiero di V.F. Allmayer; estratto da "il Pensiero" ist. editoriale Cisalpino, Milano-Varese
- Atti del 1º Congresso nazionale di filosofia "V. F., oggi", Palermo 1975.
- Atti del Convegno nazionale su l'estetica come ricerca e l'impegno dell'artista nel suo mondo, Palermo 1984 (con interventi di L. Lugarini, U. Mirabelli, L. Russo)
