= Jim Walrod =

James John Walrod (August 25, 1961 – September 25, 2017) was often referred to as a “design guru". A self-taught interior design consultant and collector of rare and unusual art, design and pop culture works, Walrod was also considered an expert in the field of mid century and Postmodern design.

In the 1980s, Walrod was an assistant art director for the Italian fashion house Fiorucci. Another of his nicknames, “the furniture pimp”, was originally coined by Mike D of the Beastie Boys and was used by the press in Rolling Stone magazine. Walrod was born in 1961 in Jersey City, New Jersey, and died in 2017 in New York City of a suspected heart attack.

== Projects ==
Walrod consulted on interiors for architects Jean Nouvel and Richard Gluckman. His collaboration with boutique hotelier Andre Balazs resulted in The Standard Downtown LA hotel.

Walrod worked with club and restaurant impresarios Eric Goode and Sean MacPherson to create The Park restaurant. After the September 11 attacks, he designed the interiors of Colors restaurant, which is operated by former employees of the Windows on the World restaurant in the World Trade Center. Opened in 2006, Colors was "inspired by the optimism of the 1939 World's Fair", according to Walrod.

Walrod designed Nolita's Steven Alan Annex, one of the additions to designer Steven Alan's line of fashion and lifestyle stores, and completed projects for Alan in the West Village, at Steven Alan Upper West Side and in NoLita.

Latterly, Walrod's commercial projects included designing Gild Hall, a business class hotel in the financial district of Manhattan, and Thompson LES, on Allen Street on the Lower East Side of Manhattan, for the Thompson Hotel Group. He also co-curated a show at Cooper Union, in cooperation with the Drawing Center, on Paul Rudolph's drawings for a Lower Manhattan Expressway .

Additionally, Walrod worked on various residential projects featured in The New York Times, The New York Times Magazine, and Architectural Digest.

== Retail and film ==
One of his furniture and design retail ventures in the 1990s was Form and Function in Tribeca, with partners Fred Schneider of The B-52's and Jack Feldman. For Ang Lee's 1997 film The Ice Storm, Walrod consulted on the period 1970s furniture and interiors. In 2004, his design of the Tribeca restaurant Pace was featured on the television program Opening Soon on the Food Network. In May 2009, Walrod's designs for Gild Hall, a Thompson hotel in the financial district, were featured as a primary setting in director Steven Soderbergh's film The Girlfriend Experience.

== See also ==
Rolling Stone Magazine
The New York Times Magazine
Fiorucci
Index Magazine
Mike D of the Beastie Boys
