= The Warrior (Marini) =

Sculpture by Marino Marini

- The sculpture outside the Palm Springs Art Museum, 2024
- Artist: Marino Marini

The Warrior is a sculpture by Marino Marini.

A bronze version is part of the collection of the Palm Springs Art Museum. It is installed at the museum's entrance.
