= Holly Shackleton =

Fashion editor

Holly Shackleton is a fashion editor. She has been editor-in-chief of Vogue International since April 2019. She was the global editor-in-chief of i-D from 2014 to 2019.
