= Kenjirō Azuma =

Japanese–born sculptor (1926–2016)

- 吾妻 兼治郎
- Born: March 12, 1926; Yamagata, Japan
- Died: October 15, 2016 (aged 90); Milan, Italy
- Education: Tokyo University of the Arts

Kenjirō Azuma (吾妻 兼治郎, Azuma Kenjirō; March 12, 1926 – October 15, 2016) was a Japanese-born sculptor, painter and teacher.

== Biography ==
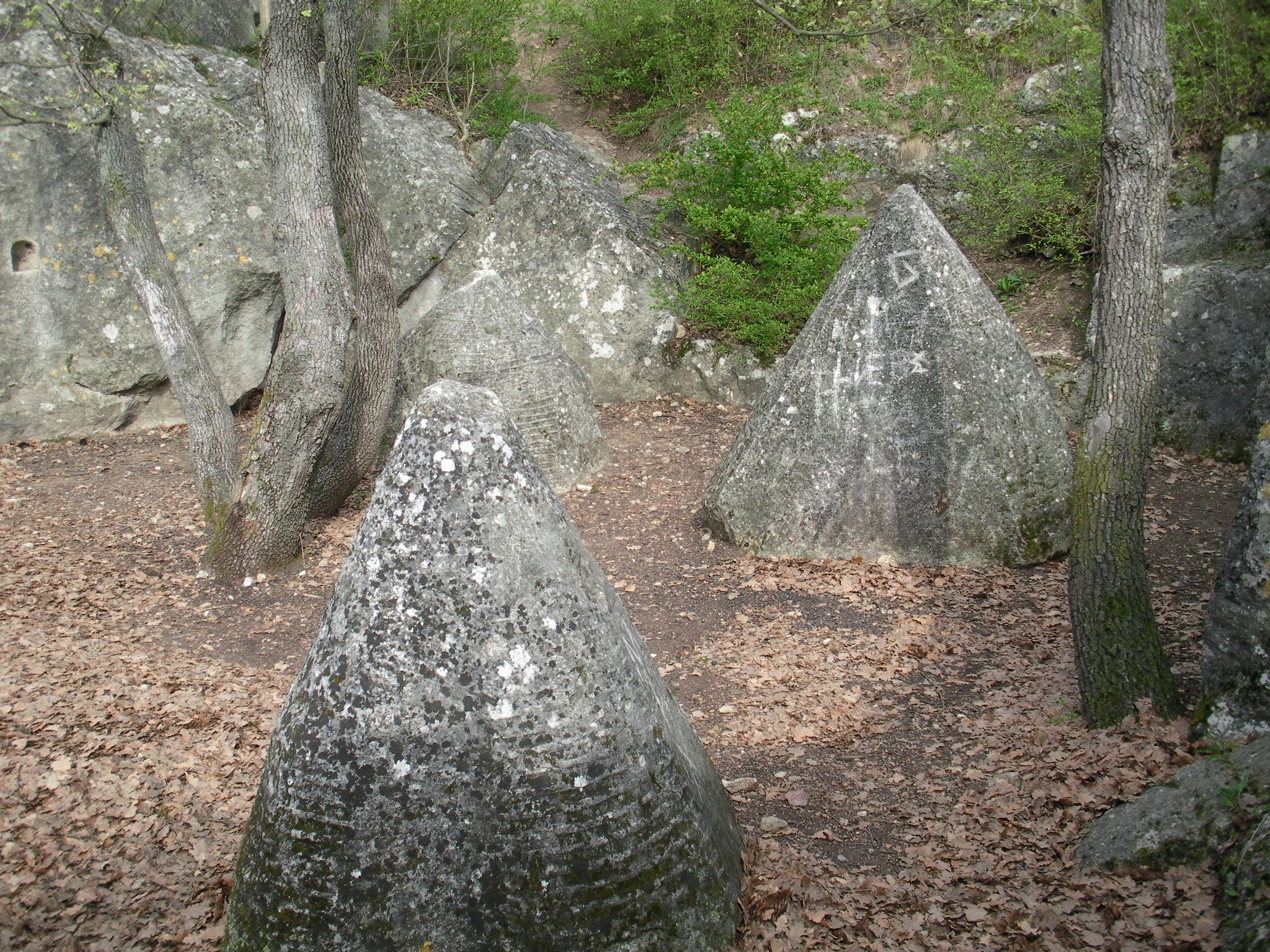
Kengiro Azuma's work (1971) at a sculpture symposium in St. Margarethen

Azuma was born March 12, 1926, in Yamagata, Japan to a family of bronze artisans. When he was 17, Azuma joined the Imperial Japanese Navy as a Kamikaze pilot, but the war ended before the time came for him to sacrifice himself. World War II and the discovery of the emperor's humanity had a great impact on the Japanese people. For Azuma personally, it created a spiritual void that pushed him towards art.

From 1949 to 1953, Azuma studied sculpture at the University of Tokyo. In 1956 he moved to Italy after receiving a scholarship from the Italian government. Azuma studied at the Brera Academy in Milan where he was a student and eventually the art assistant of Marino Marini (sculptor). In 1966, his work was exhibited as part of "The New Japanese Painting and Sculpture" at the MoMa in New York.

Azuma lived and worked in Milan for most of his career. He continued as Marino Marini's art assistant until Marini's death in 1980. From 1980 to 1990 he was a professor at the Nuova Accademia di Belle Arti. In 2015, he installed a permanent sculpture, it:MU 141, in the public square in front of the Cimitero Monumentale di Milano.

Kengiro Azuma died at his home in Milan on October 15, 2016. In 2017, in honor of Azuma, the Marino Marini Foundation hosted an exhibition of Azuma's work at the it:Palazzo Fabroni.

== Mu-464 ==
Kengiro Azuma’s contribution to the California International Sculpture Symposium at California State University Long Beach in 1965, MU-464, is an aluminum sculpture which speaks to Azuma’s personal beliefs as a Zen Buddhist, among other things. The phrase “mu mu” is written on the surface of the sculpture. “Mu” in Zen Buddhism means “nothing”, evocative of the Zen Buddhist belief that the universe emerged from nothingness. The work’s intention to evoke calm and contemplation stands in stark contrast to the somewhat chaotic behind the scenes decision making of the sculpture symposium in Long Beach, California. Azuma was selected to participate in the symposium in June 1965, only a few weeks before the symposium had begun – it is very likely that he was a short-notice replacement for another artist. Furthermore, Azuma was not able to complete MU-464 by the August 14th deadline, instead finalizing his work in early September. Additionally, Azuma was not able to create the work through bronze or steel, his usual materials of choice, due to budget constraints. Instead, MU-464 was made with aluminum which Azuma had not previously worked with. Nevertheless, the sculpture standing at just over ten feet tall was able to come to fruition. Though an unexpected amendment to Azuma’s MU series at first, the usage of aluminum did have some significance to the artist’s personal life. The material acted as a connection between Azuma and the booming aerospace industry in Southern California, given his background training as a kamikaze pilot in World War II. The process behind the actual sculpting of the work was rather spontaneous, which ties into Azuma’s philosophies about life. Overall, the sculpture symbolizes peace and its coexistence with chaos in our universe. The sculpture has moved three separate times since its inception – today it resides in the western region of CSULB’s campus.

== Awards ==
- 1995: Awarded the Shiju-hosho Prize by the Emperor of Japan. The Shiju-hosho, also called the "Medal of Honor with the Purple Ribbon", is awarded for achievements in academics or the arts.
- 1996: Awarded the Ambrogino d'Argento by the City of Milan
