= Dylan Jones =

English journalist and author (born 1960)

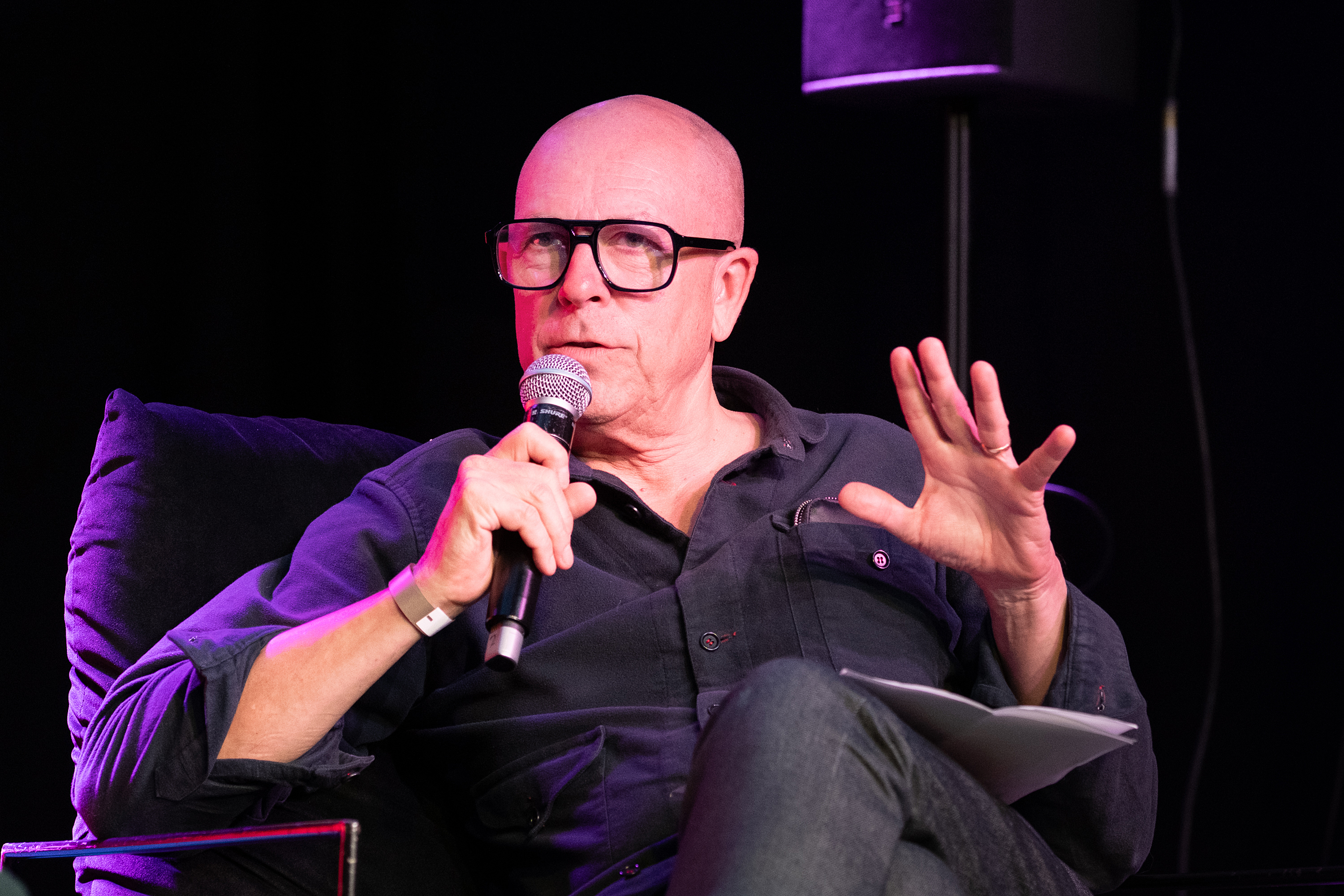
- Dylan Jones at SXSW London 2026
- Born: 1 January 1960 (age 66); Ely, Cambridgeshire, England
- Education: Chelsea School of Art; Saint Martin's School of Art
- Occupations: Journalist, magazine editor, author, broadcaster

Dylan John Jones OBE (born 1960) is an English journalist and author. He served as editor of the UK version of men's fashion and lifestyle magazine GQ from 1999 to 2021. In June 2023 Jones became the new editor-in-chief of the London Evening Standard which had been without a full-time editor since the previous October. Within three months of the daily printed paper ending its life, to be replaced by a weekly printed edition, Jones quit his job along with three other senior executives, signing off his last editorial column on 19 December 2024.

He has held senior roles with several other publications, including editor of magazines i-D and Arena, and has contributed weekly columns to newspapers The Independent and The Mail on Sunday. Jones has written multiple books.

== Education and early career ==
Jones was born in Ely, Cambridgeshire. He attended Chelsea School of Art and then Saint Martin's School of Art.

== GQ ==
Jones was appointed Officer of the Order of the British Empire (OBE) in the 2013 Birthday Honours for services to the publishing and British fashion industries.

== Books ==
In 2012, Jones wrote three books, When Ziggy Played Guitar: David Bowie and Four Minutes that Shook the World, The Biographical Dictionary of Popular Music and From the Ground Up: U2 360° Tour Official Photobook. The following year, Jones wrote The Eighties: One Day, One Decade, which was published by Preface Publishing in June 2013. The book is partly autobiographical and partly cultural and political history which charts the story of the Eighties through Live Aid in 1985.

== Politics ==
In 2018, Jones wrote for The Guardian, "Though in 2008 I 'came out' as a Tory, today I wouldn't describe myself as a Conservative." He described "the thought of Jacob Rees-Mogg being taken seriously by the electorate" as "frightening" but was more critical of Labour leader Jeremy Corbyn, saying his attitude to antisemitism in the party was "insulting". In 2017, he expressed criticism of Corbyn and his demeanour during a British GQ cover shoot. Jones was a prominent supporter of the London Garden Bridge Project.

== Bibliography ==
=== Books ===
- Jim Morrison: Dark Star, Bloomsbury, September 1990.
- Paul Smith True Brit, 1995.
- Meaty, Beaty, Big & Bouncy and Sex, Power and Travel both anthologies 1996.
- iPod, Therefore I Am, Weidenfeld & Nicolson, June 2005.
- Mr Jones' Rules for the Modern Man, Hodder & Stoughton, October 2006.
- Cameron on Cameron: Conversations with Dylan Jones, Fourth Estate, August 2008.
- Heroes, by Jones and David Bailey, Thames & Hudson, October 2010.*
- When Ziggy Played Guitar: David Bowie and Four Minutes that Shook the World, Preface Publishing, 2012.
- The Biographical Dictionary of Popular Music, Bedford Square Books, 2012
- From the Ground Up: U2 360° Tour Official Photobook, Preface Publishing, 2012.
- The Eighties: One Day, One Decade, Preface Publishing, June 2013
- Jones, Dylan (2014). Elvis has left the building : the day the King died. London: Duckworth Overlook.
- David Bowie: A Life, Crown Archetype, 2017.
- The Wichita Lineman: Searching in the Sun for the World's Greatest Unfinished Song, Faber & Faber, July 2019.
- Sweet Dreams: The Story of the New Romantics, Faber and Faber, 2020.
- Jones, Dylan (2022). Faster Than a Cannonball : 1995 and All That. London: White Rabbit. ISBN 9781474624589.
- Loaded: The Life (and Afterlife) of the Velvet Underground, White Rabbit, ISBN 1399607251; August 2023.

=== Essays and reporting ===
- "Diary". The Spectator. 312 (9464): 9. 16 January 2010.

=== Critical studies and reviews of Jones' work ===
- Wallen, Doug (September 2014). "A piece of Elvis". Australian Book Review. 364: 37. Review of Elvis has left the building.
