= Janie Schaffer =

British businessman (born 1961)

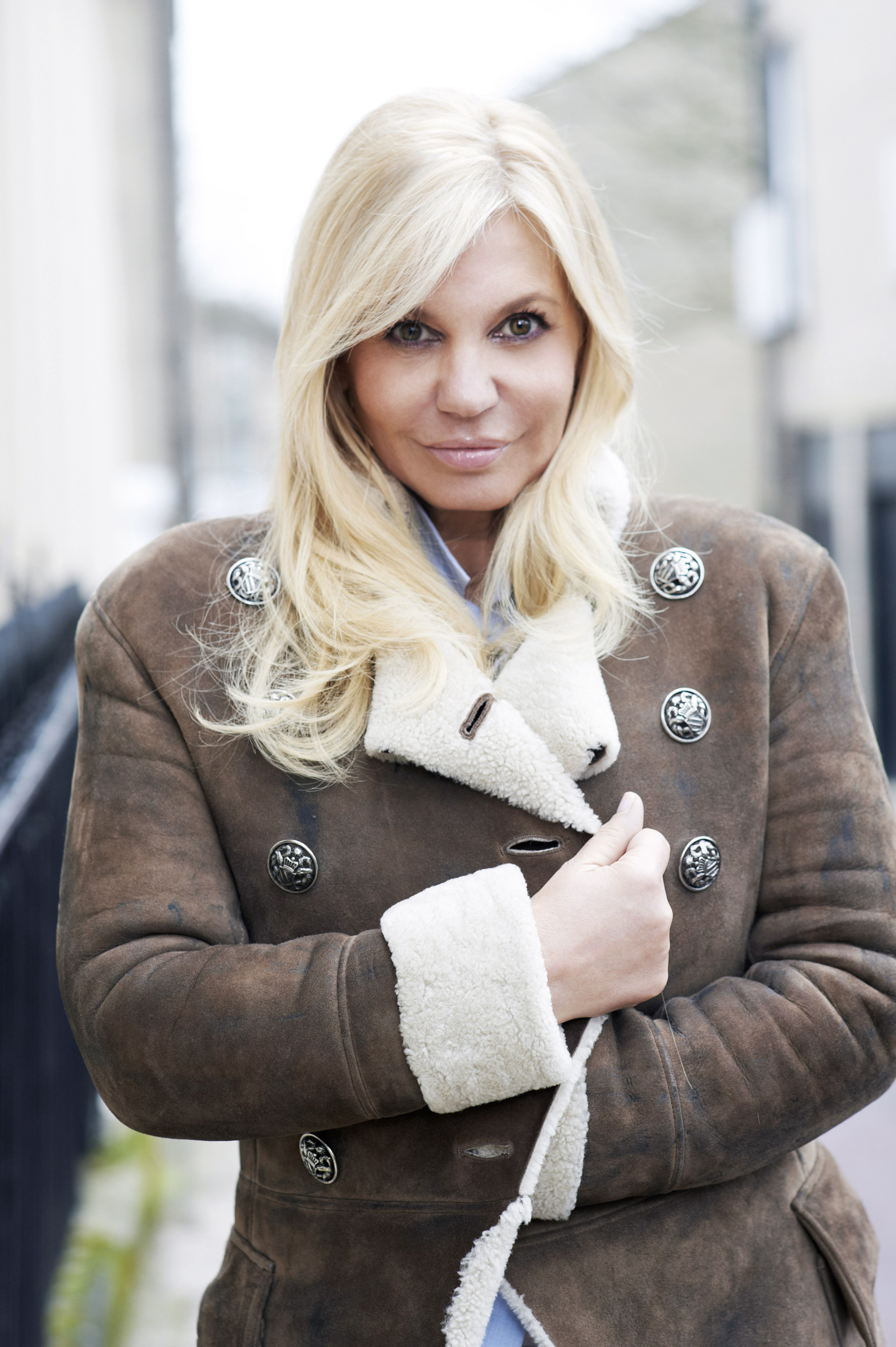
- Born: Janie Godber; 25 December 1961 (age 64)
- Occupation: Owner of Fiorucci
- Children: 3

Janie Schaffer (born 25 December 1961) is a British businesswoman, founder of Knickerbox, and bought the Italian brand Fiorucci in 2015.

== Early life ==
Born Janie Godber, she attended the London School of Fashion.

== Business career ==
Working in her early years as a designer, Janie Schaffer joined Marks & Spencer in 1983 as a trainee buyer.

=== Knickerbox ===
In October 1986 Janie Schaffer and her future spouse Stephen Schaffer launched lingerie chain Knickerbox with a £75,000 investment loan, opening their first store on Regent Street, London. By 1992 the business had expanded to 70 stores. In 1995, with Knickerbox consisting of 140 stores across Britain, Europe and the Far East, the duo decided to sell the company. After taking time out to be with her triplet daughters, Janie Schaffer consulted for The Oasis Group, developing and launching the Odille lingerie line.

=== 2008 - 2015 ===
In January 2008 Janie Schaffer accepted a role as Chief Creative Officer with US retailer Victoria's Secret, a subsidiary of Fortune 500 firm Limited brands Inc with 1,025 stores worldwide. Janie Schaffer returned to London to take up a full-time position as Director of lingerie and beauty for Marks & Spencer.

=== Fiorucci ===
In 2015 Janie bought the Italian brand Fiorucci. With her business partner Stephen Schaffer, the brand was relaunched in the summer of 2017 with a new Fiorucci website. A three storey flagship store opened on Brewer Street in Soho in September during London Fashion Week.
