= Precarious =

Precarious is an adjective that may refer to:

- Precarium, form of land tenure in which a grantee receives the property only for a period of time
- Precarity, existence lacking in predictability and security
