= I-D =

British magazine

i-D

- Travis Scott on the cover of the spring 2021 issue
- Editor-in-Chief: Steff Yotka
- Categories: Fashion magazine
- Frequency: Bi-annual
- Founder: Terry Jones
- First issue: August 1980
- Company: Bedford Media
- Country: United Kingdom
- Based in: London
- Language: English
- Website: i-d.co
- ISSN: 0262-3579

i-D is a British semiannual magazine dedicated to fashion, music, art, film and youth culture. The magazine was launched in 1980 by Terry Jones, originally as a hand-stapled fanzine. It has since evolved into a glossy publication.

In 2023 the magazine's publication was put on hold following its acquisition by Bedford Media. It returned in Spring 2025 as a biannual publication.

== Details ==
The magazine is known for its innovative photography and typography and as a training ground for fresh talent. Photographers Wolfgang Tillmans, Mario Testino, Terry Richardson, Craig McDean, Nick Knight and Juergen Teller started their careers at i-D, as did Dylan Jones and Caryn Franklin. Other photographers that have contributed to i-D include Ellen von Unwerth, Robert Fairer, Kayt Jones, Sam Rock, and Petra Collins.

People who have appeared in i-D include Madonna, Grace Jones, Naomi Campbell, Sade, John Galliano, Alexander McQueen, Kanye West, Helmut Lang, Franz Ferdinand, Chloë Sevigny, Raf Simons, Jun Takahashi, Veronique Branquinho, Lily Cole, Giles Deacon, Timothee Chalamet, Dizzee Rascal, Scarlett Johansson, Rick Owens, Selena Gomez, Rihanna, and YoungBoy Never Broke Again.

The wink and smile on each front cover—a graphic representation of the magazine's logo—are integral to the i-D identity.

== History ==
i-D was launched in 1980 by Terry Jones. The first issue was priced at 50p, and 50 issues were sold. It was one of the first magazines to cover street fashion.

Raf Simons edited the magazine's February 2001 issue.

Avril Mair stepped down as editor in October 2004; she was replaced by Glenn Waldron.

In 2012 Terry Jones sold the magazine to Vice Media; however, Jones and his wife Tricia Jones remained partners and partial shareholders.

i-D France was launched in website form in 2015.

In 2016, i-D Japan was launched as a print magazine published on a bi-annual basis. The publication's first cover featured Kiko Mizuhara. The magazine's last print issue was published in 2019; however, it is still published digitally. Also in 2016, a Chinese edition of the magazine was launched on digital platforms with accounts on Weibo and WeChat.

i-D Korea was launched as a digital-only publication in July 2021; Songin Han was appointed as the magazine's editor.

In November 2021, the magazine's fashion editor Max Clark was suspended after more than a dozen women accused him of sending sexually inappropriate messages. Clark denied the allegations.

On 14 November 2023, Bedford Media acquired the magazine from Vice Media. Bedford Media is financed by both Karlie Kloss and her husband Joshua Kushner, the younger brother of Jared Kushner the son-in-law of Donald Trump. Kloss was appointed CEO whilst Alastair (at the time Editor-in-Chief) became Chief Creative Officer and Global Editor-in-Chief of the magazine. With the purchase, publication of the magazine was paused.

The magazine's editor Alastair McKimm resigned from his role in February 2024.

i-D's digital presence was relaunched in September 2024, with the website returning and a digital cover featuring Charli XCX and Troye Sivan. Thom Bettridge was later announced as the magazine's new Editor-in-Chief, and the magazine will began publishing again from March 2025 as a bi-annual publication.

=== Editors ===
Country	Operation	Editor-in-Chief	Start year	End year
United Kingdom (i-D)	1980–present	Terry Jones	1980	2012
United Kingdom (i-D)	1980–present	Dylan Jones	1986	1988
United Kingdom (i-D)	1980–present	Caryn Franklin	1986	1988
United Kingdom (i-D)	1980–present	Alix Sharkey	1988	1989
United Kingdom (i-D)	1980–present	John Godfrey	1988	1990
United Kingdom (i-D)	1980–present	Matthew Collin	1991	1994
United Kingdom (i-D)	1980–present	Avril Mair	1994	2004
United Kingdom (i-D)	1980–present	Glenn Waldron	2004	2006
United Kingdom (i-D)	1980–present	Ben Reardon	2006	2010
United Kingdom (i-D)	1980–present	Holly Shackleton	2010	2019
United Kingdom (i-D)	1980–present	Alastair McKimm	2019	2024
United Kingdom (i-D)	1980–present	Thom Bettridge	2024	2026
United Kingdom (i-D)	1980–present	Steff Yotka	2026	present
Japan (i-D Japan)	1991–1993	Kiyoshi Yoshizawa	1991	1993
Japan (i-D Japan)	2016–2019			

=== Editions ===
i-D operates digitally in Japan, South Korea and the United Kingdom. The magazine previously had a digital presence in Australia, China, France, Germany, Italy, Latin America, Mexico, Netherlands, New Zealand, Poland, Spain, and the United States.

=== The Straight Up ===
The Straight-Up is a documentary style of photography pioneered by Terry Jones, founder and editor-in-chief of i-D magazine, in 1977. Taking its name from a West Country expression meaning 'tell it like it is', a Straight-Up typically captures a head-to-toe portrait of someone street cast with great personal style, often accompanied by a short question-and-answer defining their life, likes and dislikes.

In 1977, inspired by August Sander's social documentary portraits and Irving Penn's Small Trade series, Jones commissioned British photographer Steve Johnston to photograph London punks head-to-toe against a plain white wall on the Kings Road. Jones intended the pictures to run as a cultural piece in British Vogue, where he then worked as art director. The photographs however were considered too revolutionary, so Jones ran the images in a book he was art directing called Not Another Punk Book, published by Aurum Press. These Straight-Ups went on to form the basis of i-D, a hand-stapled fanzine founded by Jones in 1980. As i-D grew from a fanzine into a fashion magazine, the Straight-Up style of photography continued, culminating in an entire issue of the magazine dedicated to the photographic style in August 2003 (The Straight-Up Issue, No. 234). Today Straight-Ups continue to be featured in i-D.

== Publications ==
- A Decade of i-Deas, the Encyclopaedia of the '80s. Compiled and Produced by i-D Magazine. Edited by John Godfrey. London: Penguin, 1990. ISBN 0-14-012952-9.
- Family Future Positive. Terry and Tricia Jones, and Avril Mair. London: i-D, 1998. ISBN 978-0-9512928-0-8.
- Fashion Now. i-D selects the world's 150 most important designers. Terry Jones and Avril Mair. Cologne: Taschen, 2003. ISBN 3-8228-2187-X.
- Fashion Now 2. i-D selects the world's 160 most important designers. Terry Jones and Susie Rushton. Cologne: Taschen, 2005. ISBN 3-8228-4241-9.
- i-D: Wink + Smile! The First Forty Years. Rizzoli, 2022. ISBN 978-0847871780
- Safe+Sound. Terry and Tricia Jones. London: i-D, 2007. ISBN 978-0-9552174-1-8.
- SMILE i-D. Fashion and Style. 20 years of i-D magazine. Terry Jones. London: i-D / Cologne: Taschen, 2000. ISBN 3-8228-5778-5.

== Exhibitions ==
- Smile i-D. Initially launched in 2001 for i-D's 20th birthday, Smile i-D highlighted the spirit of the magazine. Since then, the show toured internationally, growing with each destination to include new material. Wapping Hydraulic Power Station, London, April 2001; Armani flagship store, Milan, June 2001; Espace Cardin, Paris, October 2001; Art Directors Club, New York, November 2001; El Dorrego, Buenos Aires, October/November 2003; Laboratorio Arte Alameda, Mexico City, February 2004; Museo Nacional de Bellas Artes, Santiago, Chile, April 2004; Corp Banca, Caracas, July 2004; "+7.095.Art" gallery, Moscow, April 2007.
- i-Dentity. The exhibition focused on identity, using still images, film, sound and smell. Fashion and Textile Museum, London, October 2005 (For i-D's 25th anniversary) then toured to New York, February 2006; Hong Kong, April 2006; Tokyo, April 2006; Beijing, May 2006.
- Safe+Sound. London College of Fashion, London, February 2007; CP Company, Milan, April 2007.

== See also ==
- List of people on the cover of i-D magazine
