= Marino Marini (sculptor) =

Italian sculptor (1901–1980)

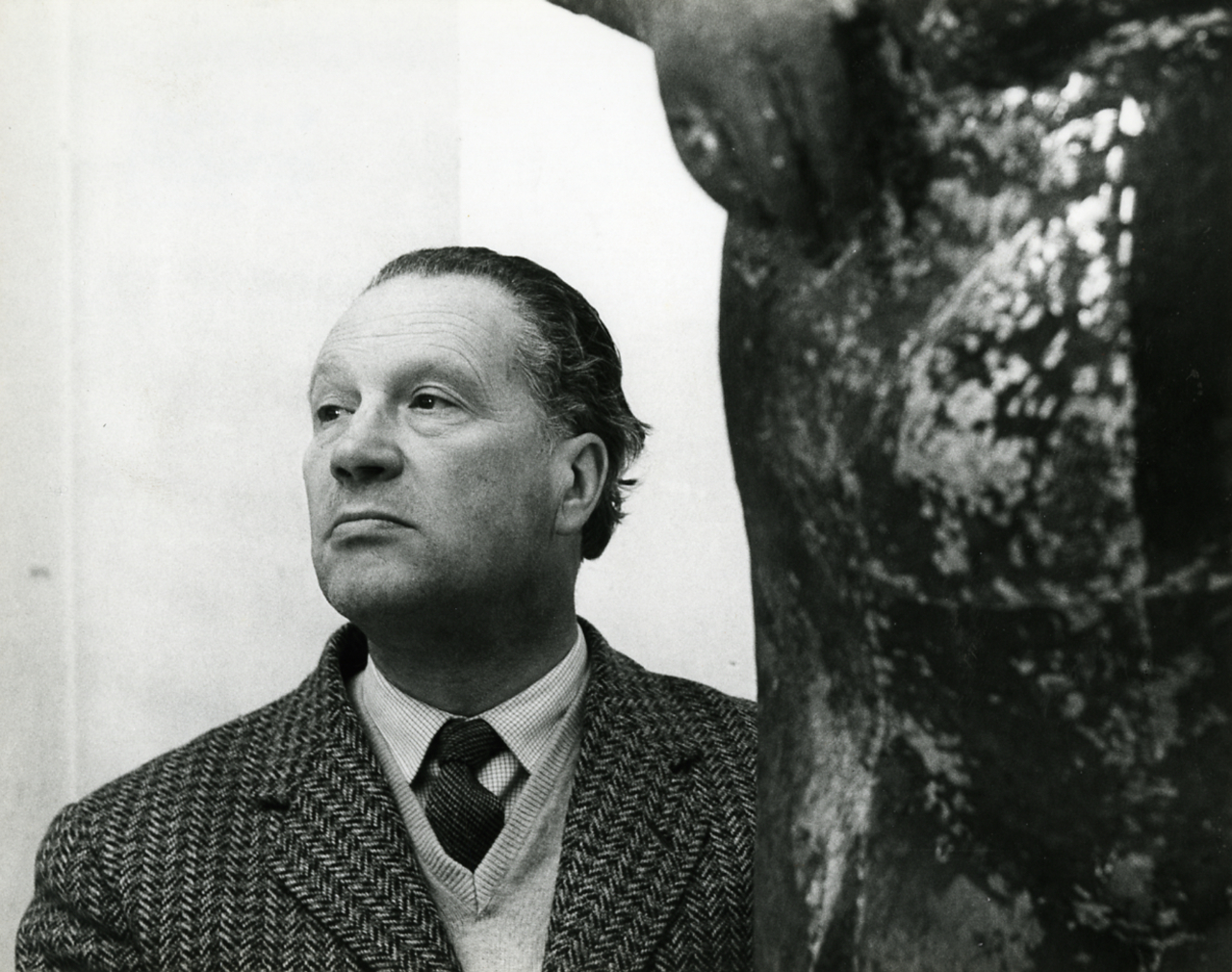
- Marini photographed by Paolo Monti, 1958
- Born: 27 February 1901; Pistoia, Tuscany, Italy
- Died: 6 August 1980 (aged 79); Viareggio, Tuscany, Italy
- Known for: Sculpture
- Spouse: Mercedes Pedrazzini

Marino Marini (27 February 1901 – 6 August 1980) was an Italian sculptor and educator.

== Biography ==
He attended the Accademia di Belle Arti in Florence in 1917. Although he never abandoned painting, Marini devoted himself primarily to sculpture from about 1922. From this time, his work was influenced by Etruscan art and the sculpture of Arturo Martini. Marini succeeded Martini as professor at the Scuola d’Arte di Villa Reale in Monza, near Milan, in 1929, a position he retained until 1940.

During this period, Marini travelled frequently to Paris, where he associated with Massimo Campigli, Giorgio de Chirico, Alberto Magnelli, and Filippo Tibertelli de Pisis. In 1936, he moved to Tenero-Locarno, in Ticino Canton, Switzerland; during the following few years, the artist often visited Zürich and Basel, where he became a friend of Alberto Giacometti, Germaine Richier, and Fritz Wotruba. In 1936, he received the Prize of the Quadriennale of Rome. In 1938, he married Mercedes Pedrazzini.

In 1940, he accepted a professorship in sculpture at the Accademia di Belle Arti di Brera (now Brera Academy) in Milan. Notable students of his include sculptor Parviz Tanavoli. In 1943, he went into exile in Switzerland, exhibiting in Basel, Bern, and Zurich. In 1946, the artist settled permanently in Milan.

He is buried at Cimitero Comunale of Pistoia, Toscana, Italy.

== Career ==
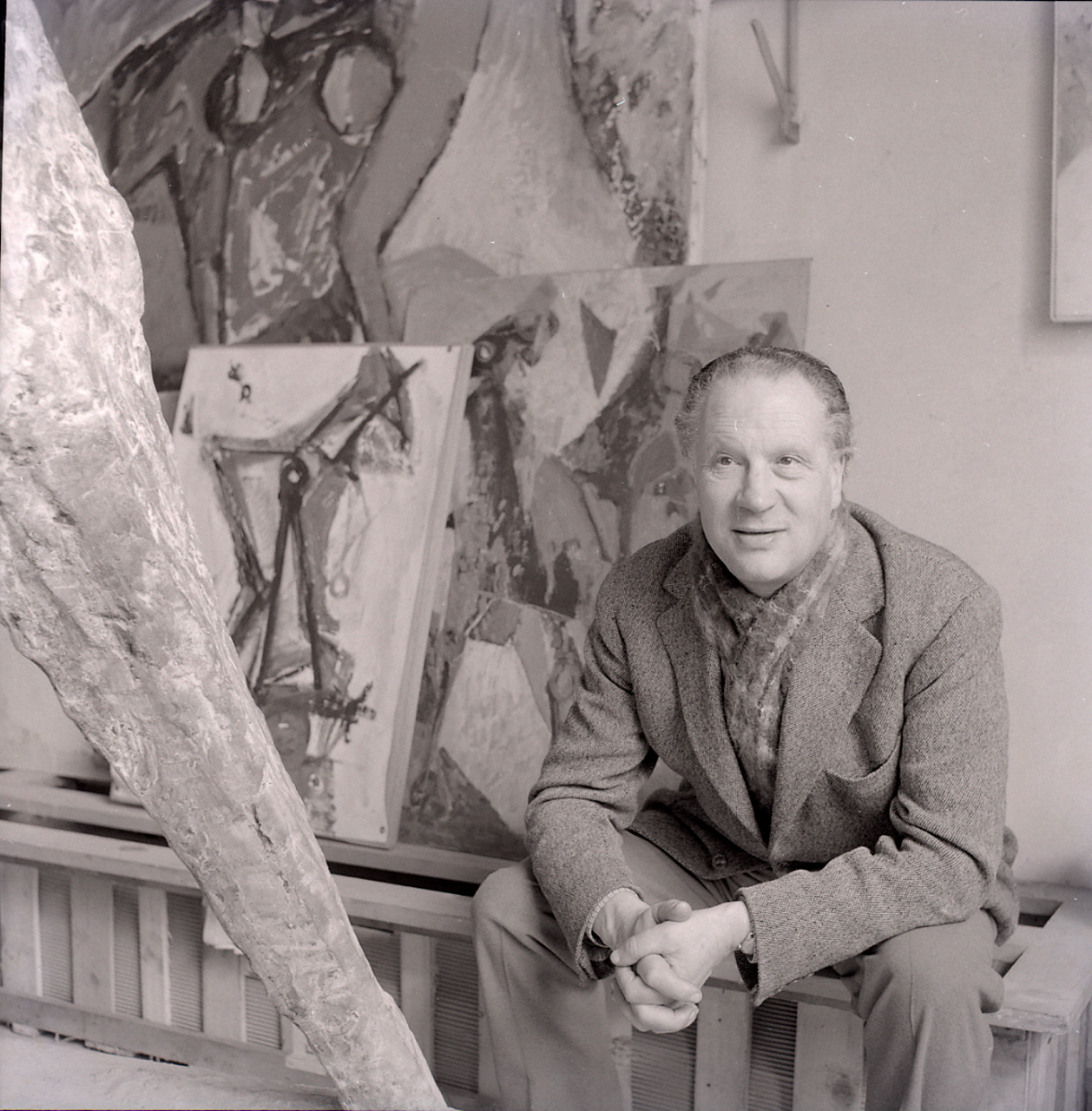
Marino Marini, photo by Paolo Monti, 1963 (Fondo Paolo Monti, BEIC)

He participated in the 'Twentieth-Century Italian Art' show at the Museum of Modern Art in New York City in 1944. Curt Valentin began exhibiting Marini's work at his Buchholz Gallery in New York in 1950, on which occasion the sculptor visited the city and met Jean Arp, Max Beckmann, Alexander Calder, Lyonel Feininger, and Jacques Lipchitz. On his return to Europe, he stopped in London, where the Hanover Gallery had organized a solo show of his work, and there met Henry Moore. In 1951, a Marini exhibition travelled from the Kestner-Gesellschaft Hannover to the Kunstverein in Hamburg and the Haus der Kunst of Munich. He was awarded the Grand Prize for Sculpture at the Venice Biennale in 1952 and the Feltrinelli Prize at the Accademia dei Lincei in Rome in 1954. One of his monumental sculptures was installed in The Hague in 1959.

Retrospectives of Marini's work took place at the Kunsthaus Zürich in 1962 and at the Palazzo Venezia in Rome in 1966. His paintings were exhibited for the first time at Toninelli Arte Moderna in Milan in 1963–64. In 1973, a permanent installation of his work opened at the Galleria d’Arte Moderna in Milan, and in 1978, a Marini show was presented at the National Museum of Modern Art in Tokyo.

There is a museum dedicated to his work in Florence in the former church of San Pancrazio. His work may also be found in museums such as the Civic Gallery of Modern Art in Milan, the Tate Collection, The Angel of the City at the Peggy Guggenheim Collection, Venice, the Norton Simon Museum, Museum de Fundatie and the Hirshhorn Museum and Sculpture Garden in Washington, D.C.

== Work ==
The Pilgrim (Il pellegrino), bronze sculpture by Marino Marini, 1939, Museum of Fine Arts, Houston

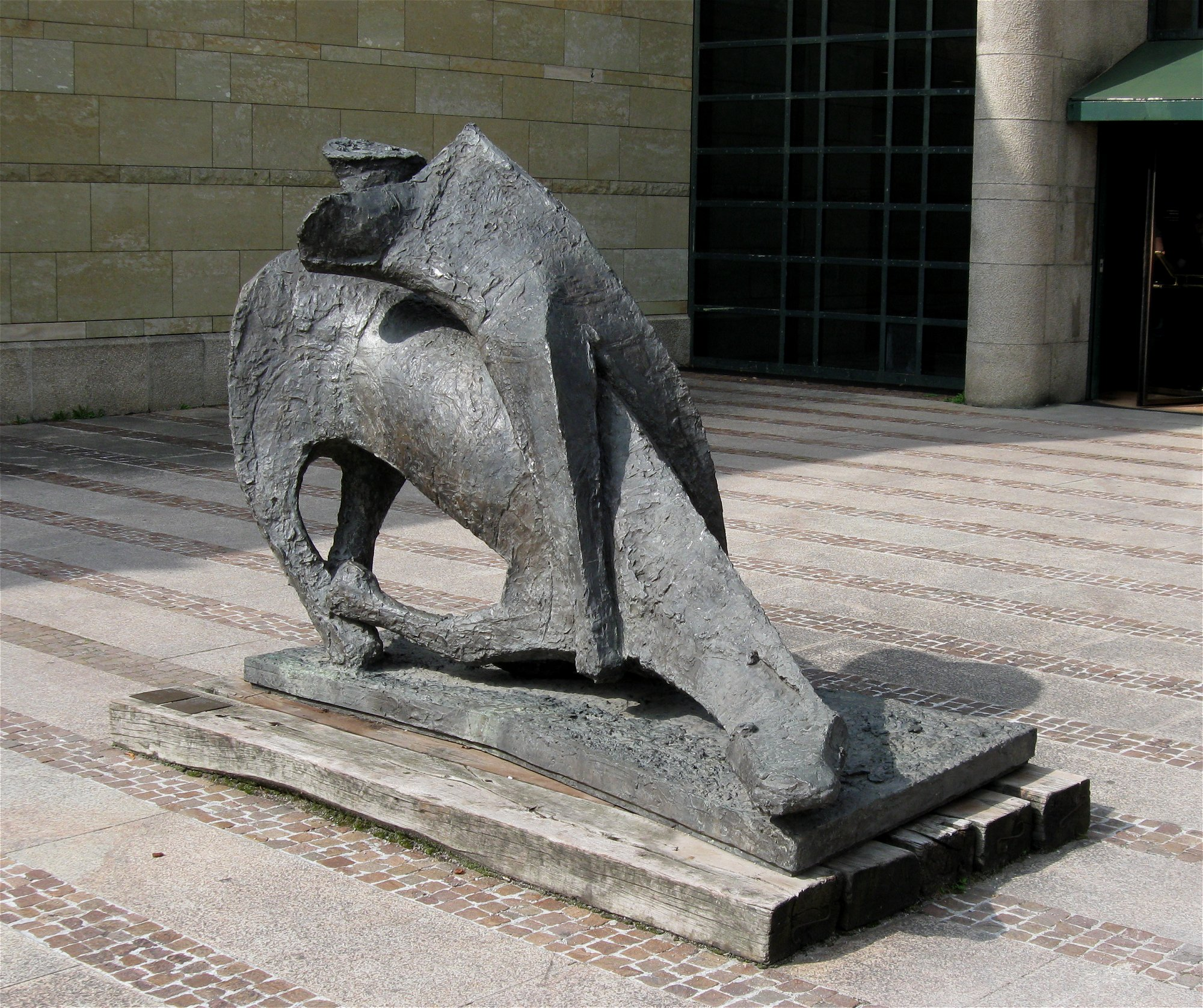
Miracolo, 1959/60. Equestrian sculpture by Marino Marini in front of the Neue Pinakothek in Munich

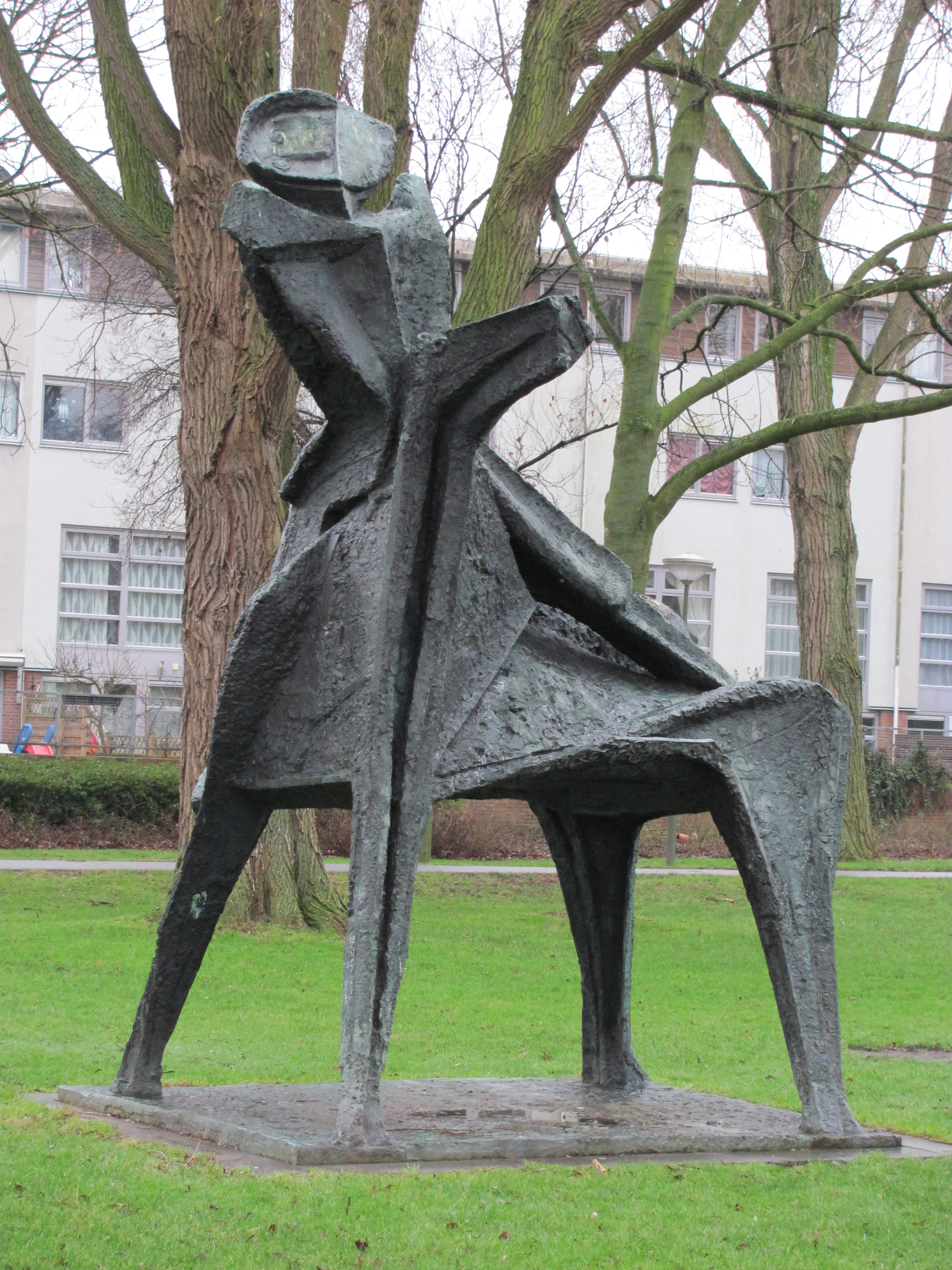
Rider (Arcangelo), 1959, The Hague

Marini developed several themes in sculpture: equestrian, Pomonas (nudes), portraits, and circus figures. He drew on traditions of Etruscan and Northern European sculpture in developing these themes. His aim was to develop mythical images by interpreting classical themes in light of modern concerns and techniques.

Marini is particularly famous for his series of stylised equestrian statues, which feature a man with outstretched arms on a horse. The evolution of the horse and rider as a subject in Marini's works reflects the artist's response to the changing context of the modern world. This theme appeared in his work in 1936. At first, the proportions of horse and rider are slender, and both are "poised, formal, and calm." By the next year, the horse is depicted rearing, and the rider is gesturing. By 1940, the forms are simpler and more archaic in spirit; the proportions squatter.

After World War II, in the late 1940s, the horse is planted, immobile, with neck extended, ears pinned back, mouth open. An example, in the Peggy Guggenheim Collection in Venice, is "The Angel of the City," depicting "affirmation and charged strength associated explicitly with sexual potency." In later works, the rider is, increasingly, oblivious of his mount, "involved in his own visions or anxieties." In the artist's final work, the rider is unseated as the horse falls to the ground in an "apocalyptic image of lost control", which parallels Marini's growing despair for the future of the world.

== See also ==
- The Warrior (Marini)

== Bibliography ==
- Emilio Greco, Poesie con 5 disegni, Edizioni Fiumara, Milano, 1952 (100 esemplari numerati)
- Vittorio Masselli; Emilio Greco (disegni) (1963). Giostra di fanciulle. Roma: Razzi. SBN IT\ICCU\SBL\0259606.
- Leonardo Sciascia; Emilio Greco (acquaforte) (1966). Racconti siciliani. Le mete. Urbino: Istituto Statale d'Arte del Libro. SBN IT\ICCU\BVE\0654829.
- Giulio Briani (1976). Tre favole vere. con disegni di Emilio Greco. Roma: Trevi. SBN IT\ICCU\RMS\2477969.
- Emilio Greco (1978). L'oro antico delle vigne. prefazione di Giacinto Spagnoletti. Roma. SBN IT\ICCU\SBL\0339310.
- Emilio Greco (1978). 19 poesie per 19 disegni di Greco (in Italian and Japanese). Tokyo: Contemporary Sculpture Center. SBN IT\ICCU\BVE\0542395.
- Emilio Greco (1980). Lo Jonio corrusco di vento. Catania-Roma: ASPA. SBN IT\ICCU\UM1\0094116.
- Emilio Greco (1980). Appunti di una vita (1937–1980). introduzione di Giacinto Spagnoletti. Palermo: Sellerio. SBN IT\ICCU\RAV\0091263.
- Gianfranco Nolli (testo); Emilio Greco (disegni) (1980). Apocrifi biblici moderni. Città del Vaticano: Libreria Editrice Vaticana. SBN IT\ICCU\CSA\0025539.
- Emilio Greco (1993). Mario Pisani (ed.). A ritroso nel tempo. Poesie e prose. Roma: Officina. SBN IT\ICCU\CFI\0438443.

== Exhibition Catalogues ==
- Marini, Marino. "Sculture, Opere Su Carta." (Galleria Pieter Coray, Lugano: Kent Fine Art, New York. Milano: Electa, 1991.
