= Film studies =

Academic discipline focused on cinema

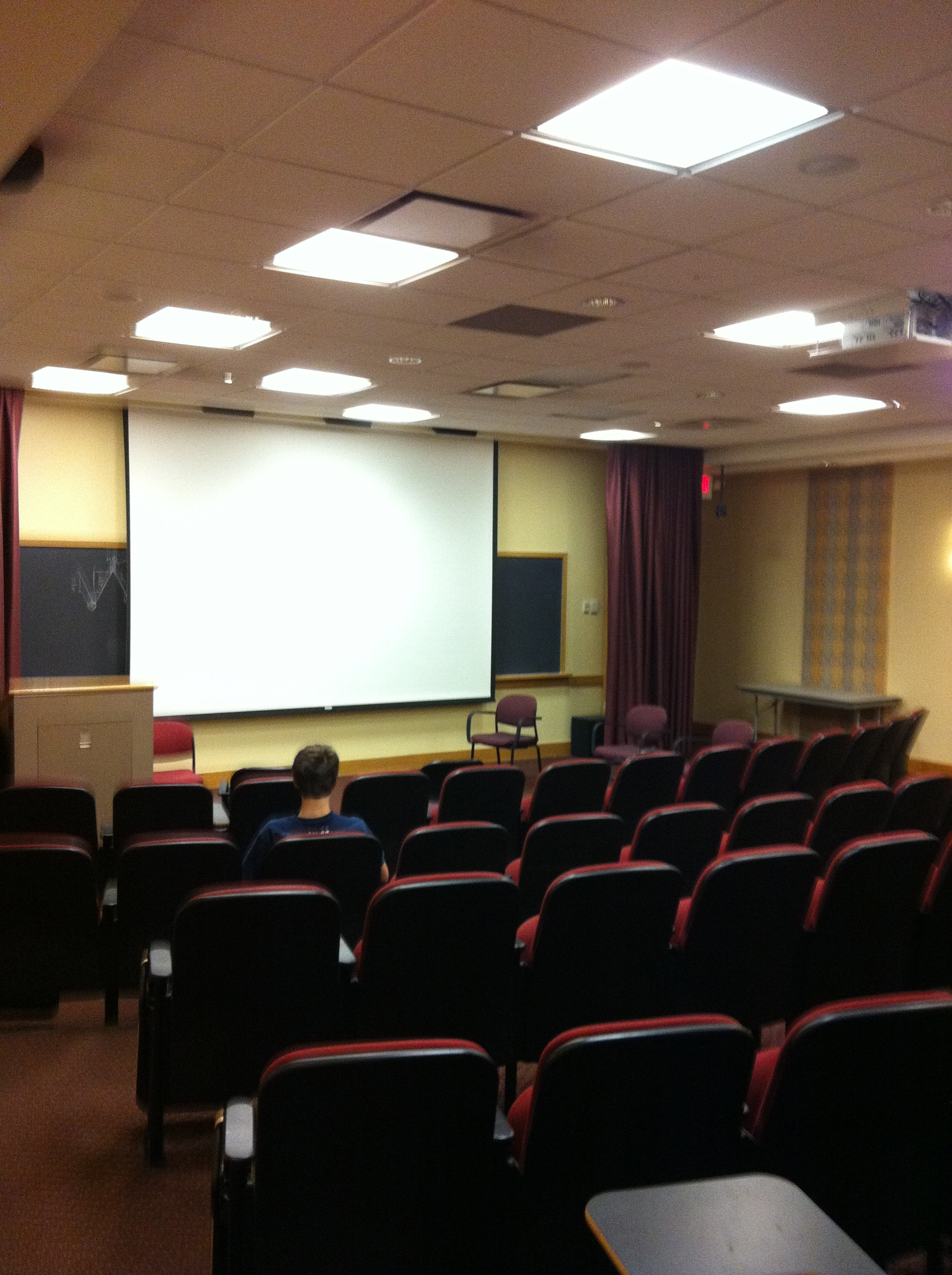
Film-screening room at Georgetown University, Washington, D.C.

Film studies is an academic discipline that deals with various theoretical, historical, and critical approaches to cinema as an art form and a medium. It is sometimes subsumed within media studies and is often compared to television studies.

Film studies is less concerned with advancing proficiency in film production than it is with exploring the narrative, artistic, cultural, economic, and political implications of the cinema. In searching for these social-ideological values, film studies takes a series of critical approaches for the analysis of production, theoretical framework, context, and creation. Also, in studying film, possible careers include critic or production. Overall the study of film continues to grow, as does the industry on which it focuses.

Academic journals publishing film studies work include Sight and Sound, Film Comment, Film International, CineAction, Screen, Journal of Cinema and Media Studies, Film Quarterly, and Journal of Film and Video.

== History ==
Film studies as an academic discipline emerged in the 20th century, decades after the invention of motion pictures. Rather than focusing on the technical aspects of film production, film studies are concentrated on film theory, which approaches film critically as an art, and the writing of film historiography. Because film became an invention and industry only in the late 19th century, a generation of film producers and directors existed significantly before the academic analysis that followed in later generations.

Early film schools focused on the production and subjective critique of film rather than on the critical approaches, history and theory used to study academically. The concept of film studies arose as a means of analyzing the formal aspects of film as the films were created. Established in 1919, the Moscow Film School was the first school in the world to focus on film. In the United States, the USC School of Cinematic Arts, established in 1929, was the first cinematic-based school, which was created in agreement with the Academy of Motion Picture Arts and Sciences. It was also the first to offer an academic major in film in 1932, but the program lacked many of the distinctions associated with contemporary film study. Universities began to implement cinema-related curricula without separation of the abstract and practical approaches.

The German Deutsche Filmakademie Babelsberg was founded during the era of the Third Reich in 1938. Its lecturers included Willi Forst and Heinrich George. Students were required to create films in order to complete their studies at the academy.

A movement away from Hollywood productions in the 1950s turned cinema into a more artistic independent endeavor. It was the creation of the auteur theory, which examines film as the director's vision and art, that broadened the scope of academic film studies to a worldwide presence in the 1960s. In 1965, film critic Robin Wood, in his writings on Alfred Hitchcock, declared that Hitchcock's films contained the same complexities of Shakespeare's plays. Similarly, French director Jean Luc Godard, a contributor to the influential magazine Cahiers du Cinéma, wrote: "Jerry Lewis [...] is the only one in Hollywood doing something different, the only one who isn't falling in with the established categories, the norms, the principles. [...] Lewis is the only one today who's making courageous films."

A catalyst in the success and stature of academic film studies has been large donations to universities by successful commercial filmmakers. For example, director George Lucas donated $175 million to the USC School of Cinematic Arts in 2006.

== Approaches to film studies ==
- Analytic
  - Cognitive film theory
  - Historical poetics
  - Linguistic film theory
  - Neoformalism
- Classical
  - Formalist film theory
- Continental
  - Feminist film theory
  - Film semiotics
  - Marxist film theory
  - Psychoanalytic film theory
  - Screen theory
  - Structuralist film theory
- Criticism
  - Auteur theory
  - Schreiber theory
- Historiographical
  - Film history
  - History of film technology
  - New cinema history
  - Media archaeology

== Modern film studies ==
Today, film studies are taught worldwide and has grown to encompass numerous methods for teaching history, culture and society. Many liberal arts colleges and universities, as well as American high schools, contain courses specifically focused on the analysis of film. Modern-day film studies increasingly reflect popular culture and art, and a wide variety of curricula have emerged for analysis of critical approaches used in film. Students are typically expected to form the ability to detect conceptual shifts in film, a vocabulary for the analysis of film form and style, a sense of ideological dimensions of film and an awareness of extra textual domains and possible direction of film in the future. Universities often allow students to participate in film research and attend seminars of specialized topics to enhance their critical abilities.

=== Common curriculum ===
The curriculum of tertiary-level film studies programs often include but are not limited to:

- Introduction to film studies
- Modes of film studies
- Close analysis of film
- History of film/media
- Analysis with emphasis
1. Attention to time period
2. Attention to regional creation
3. Attention to genre
4. Attention to creators
- Methods of film production

=== American film studies ===
A total of 144 tertiary institutions in the United States offer a major program in film studies. This number continues to grow each year with new interest in film studies. Institutions offering film degrees as part of their arts or communications curricula differ from institutions with dedicated film programs.

The success of the American film industry has contributed to the popularity of academic film studies in the U.S., and film-related degrees often enable graduates to pursue careers in the production of film, especially directing and producing films. Courses often combine alternate media, such as television or new media, in combination with film studies.

=== Worldwide film studies ===
Film-studies programs at all levels are offered worldwide, primarily in the countries in the Global North. In many cases, film studies can be found in departments of media studies or communication studies. Film archives and museums such as the Eye Filmmuseum in Amsterdam also conduct scholarly projects alongside educational and outreach programs.

Film festivals play an important role in the study of film and may include discourses on topics such as film style, aesthetics, representation, production, distribution, social impact, history, archival and curation. Major festivals such as the Cannes Film Festival offer extensive programs with talks and panel discussions. They also inform film historiography, most actively through retrospectives and historical sections such as Cannes Classics.

Film festival FESPACO serves as a major hub for discourse on cinema on the African continent.

== Prominent scholars ==
- Hugo Münsterberg
- Ricciotto Canudo
- Germaine Dulac
- Béla Balázs
- Siegfried Kracauer
- Vsevolod Pudovkin
- Jean Epstein
- Sergei Eisenstein
- Lev Kuleshov
- Jean Mitry
- Rudolf Arnheim
- Paul Rotha
- André Bazin
- Alexandre Astruc
- Gilles Deleuze
- Stanley Cavell
- Andrew Sarris
- Jean-Louis Baudry
- Christian Metz
- François Truffaut
- Robin Wood
- Noël Burch
- Raymond Durgnat
- E. Ann Kaplan
- Jeanine Basinger
- Teresa de Lauretis
- Peter Wollen
- Richard Barsam
- Teshome Gabriel
- Raymond Bellour
- Molly Haskell
- Marsha Kinder
- Vivian Sobchack
- Claire Johnston
- Laura Mulvey
- Robert Stam
- James Naremore
- Bill Nichols
- James Monaco
- Jacques Aumont
- Pam Cook
- Peter Bondanella
- Barbara Creed
- Jonathan Rosenbaum
- Thomas Elsaesser
- Serge Daney
- Hamid Naficy
- Richard Dyer
- Ian Christie
- Dudley Andrew
- Annette Kuhn
- Janet Staiger
- Linda Williams
- Noël Carroll
- Francesco Casetti
- David Bordwell
- Michel Chion
- B. Ruby Rich
- Slavoj Žižek
- Colin MacCabe
- Kristin Thompson
- Mary Ann Doane
- Elizabeth Cowie
- Jonathan Beller
- Geoff Andrew
- Adrian Martin
- David Kipen
- Mark Cousins

== Academic journals ==
- Cinema Journal
- Film-Philosophy
- Film Quarterly
- Film & History
- Historical Journal of Film, Radio and Television
- Journal of Film and Video
- Journal of Popular Film & Television
- New Review of Film and Television Studies
- Screen
- The Velvet Light Trap
- Television & New Media

== See also ==
- Audiovisualogy
- Cinemeducation, the use of film in medical education
- Cinephilia
- Film genre
- Filmmaking
- Glossary of motion picture terms
- Experimental film
- Fictional film
- History of film
- Philosophy of film
- Outline of film
- Theatre studies
