= Jason Mittell =

American professor (born 1970)

- Born: 1970 (age 55–56); Boston, U.S.
- Occupations: scholar and professor
- Known for: Complex TV

Academic background
- Education: B.A., Oberlin College; M.A. and PhD. University of Wisconsin–Madison

Academic work
- Discipline: television studies and digital humanities
- Institutions: Georgia State University, Middlebury College
- Website: https://justtv.wordpress.com/

Jason Mittell (born 1970) is a professor of American studies and film and media culture at Middlebury College whose research interests include the history of television, media, culture, new media, and digital humanities. He is author of four books, Genre and Television (2004), Television and American Culture (2009), Complex TV: The Poetics of Contemporary Television Storytelling (NYU Press, 2015), and Narrative Theory and Adaptation (Bloomsbury, 2017). He also co-edited How To Watch Television (NYU Press, 2013 and 2020) and co-authored The Videographic Essay: Practice and Pedagogy. His digital-humanities activities focus primarily on videographic media criticism and, in 2015, he co-founded the first "Scholarship in Sound & Image" workshop, supported by a grant from the National Endowment for the Humanities. Moreover, he is journal manager and co-editor of [in]Transition: Journal of Videographic Film & Moving Studies, published by the Open Library of Humanities and supported by the Society for Cinema and Media Studies.

== Career ==
=== Education ===
Mittell received his Ph.D. in Communication Arts from the University of Wisconsin–Madison's Media & Cultural Studies Program (part of the Department of Communication Arts) in August 2000. In the spring of 1996, Mittell obtained an M.A. in the same concentration and program. Mittell completed his undergraduate studies at Oberlin College in Oberlin, Ohio in 1992, graduating with a B.A. and majoring in English and Theater.

=== Academic positions ===
Mittell taught Communication at Georgia State University from 2000 to 2002. Currently, he is a professor at Middlebury College, where he teaches a number of courses related to television, culture, and media, such as Television and American Culture, Theories of Popular Culture, Media Technology and Cultural Change, American Media Industries, Animated Film & TV, Narration Across Media, Media and Childhood in American Culture, and Urban American and Serial Television: Watching The Wire.

His research interests include pop culture topics such as television history and criticism, media and cultural history, genre theory, narratology, animation and children's media, cultural historiography, and new media studies and technological convergence. He is currently writing a book on contemporary American television narrative. Mittell also writes a blog entitled JustTV.

=== Complex TV (2015) ===
Mittell's book Complex TV outlines a historical poetics of contemporary television series, which he calls "complex TV." Mittell argues that the "complex" television series of today feature an array of storytelling techniques which cannot be adequately understood through the use of cinematic and literary theory. This is especially the case with seriality, i.e. the fact that television series are told in several, separate episodes. To Mittell, this form of television drama emerged in the early 1990s and is characterized by its use of “narrative special effect” which is to say that a program sometimes "flexes its storytelling muscles to confound and amaze a viewer”, e.g. by using flashbacks in innovative ways.

Being based in Bordwellian historical poetics, this books aims to "identify and describe the formal properties that create such textured narratives." To film scholar Sarah Kozloff, this means that Mittell's work shares some similarities with Seymour Chatman's work on film narration.

Mittell's book also builds cognitivist assumptions, which means that to Mittell “comprehension is based on the cognitive poetic model developed primarily through David Bordwell’s work on film narration. The core assumption of this approach is that viewers actively construct storyworlds in their minds, and that the best way to understand the comprehension process is through the tools of cognitive psychology.” In line with this, Mittell also draws on Murray Smith's work. Mittell, however, makes a point of stressing that he believes that cognitivist approaches are fully compatible with cultural approaches in terms of understanding and studying television shows, arguing that we "can combine what we know about cultural contexts with the mechanics of mental comprehension and engagement to develop a more pluralistic set of theoretical tools."

=== Use of Wikipedia for college research ===
In an interview in The New York Times on February 21, 2007, Mittell defended the use of Wikipedia as a citeable resource for college-level research. Mittell responded to critics that questioned the accuracy and reliability of an online document that anyone in the world can edit at any time by arguing that “The message that is being sent is that ultimately they see it as a threat to traditional knowledge...[;] I see it [Wikipedia] as an opportunity. What does that mean for traditional scholarship? Does traditional scholarship lose value?”

== Publications ==
=== Books ===
- Genre and Television (Routledge, 2004),
  - The book "...proposes a new understanding of television genres as cultural categories, offering a set of in-depth historical and critical examinations to explore five key aspects of television genre: history, industry, audience, text, and genre mixing." Mittell uses a number of "well-known television programs" to develop "...a new model of genre historiography and illustrat[e] how genres are at work within nearly every facet of television..." Mittell's book "...argues that through analyzing how television genre operates as a cultural practice, we can better comprehend how television actively shapes our social world."
- Television and American Culture (Oxford, 2009),
- Complex TV: The Poetics of Contemporary Television Storytelling (NYU Press, 2015).
- Narrative Theory and Adaptation (Bloomsbury, 2017).

=== Selected articles ===
- "The Great Saturday Morning Exile: Scheduling Cartoons on Television's Periphery in the 1960s," in Prime Time Animation: Television Animation and American Culture, edited by Carol Stabile and Mark Harrison (New York: Routledge Press, 2003).
- "Before the Scandals: The Radio Precedents of the Quiz Show Genre," in The Radio Reader: Essays in the Cultural History of US Radio Broadcasting, edited by Michele Hilmes and Jason Loviglio, (New York: Routledge Press, 2002), 319–42.
- “A Cultural Approach to Television Genre Theory,” article reprinted in The Television Studies Reader, edited by Robert C. Allen and Annette Hill (New York: Routledge Press, 2005).
- “Classic Network System” and “Generic Cycles: Innovation, Imitation, Saturation,” in The Television History Book, edited by Michele Hilmes and Jason Jacobs (London: British Film Institute, 2005).
