= Murray Smith (philosopher and film theorist) =

Philosophy of film scholar

Murray Smith is a film theorist and philosopher of art based at the University of Kent, where he is Professor of Philosophy, Art, and Film and co-director of the Aesthetics Research Centre. He is the author of three books and numerous articles on film and aesthetics, and the co-editor of three collections of essays. He was President of the Society for Cognitive Studies of the Moving Image from 2014 to 2017, and has served on the editorial boards of Screen, Cinema Journal, the British Journal of Aesthetics, Projections and Series. He has held a Leverhulme Research Fellowship (2005–06), and a Laurance S Rockefeller Fellowship at Princeton University’s Centre for Human Values (2017–18). He delivered a Kracauer Lecture in 2014 at the Goethe University Frankfurt, the inaugural Beacon Institute lecture in 2015, and the Beardsley Lecture in 2018, sponsored by Temple University at the Barnes Foundation.

== Work ==
Murray Smith works in cognitive film theory and analytic philosophy of film. In Engaging Characters: Fiction, Emotion, and the Cinema (1995/revised edition 2022) Smith rehabilitated the idea that characters are central to our experience of narrative. His approach to our emotional responses to characters draws on cognitive science and philosophy of mind. Film Theory and Philosophy (1997), which Smith edited with Richard Allen, makes the wider case for an approach to film drawing on the tools of analytic philosophy. In Film, Art, and the Third Culture (2017), Smith elaborates and defends the approach underpinning much of his earlier research, arguing in favour of a naturalised or ‘third cultural’ approach to aesthetics, integrating the knowledge and methods of the humanities and the sciences.

== Biography ==
Smith attended Dame Alice Owen's School in Potters Bar, and studied English Language and Literature at the University of Liverpool. He began his career as a film theorist as a graduate student at the University of Wisconsin-Madison, where he completed his PhD under the supervision of David Bordwell. He is the younger brother of the literary historian Professor Nigel Smith, and spouse of sociologist Professor Miri Song (University of Kent). Smith plays bass in the Free Range Orchestra, avatars of the New Canterbury scene.

== Books ==
- Murray Smith, Engaging Characters: Fiction, Emotion, and the Cinema (Oxford: Clarendon Press, 1995).
- Murray Smith and Richard Allen (eds), Film Theory and Philosophy (Oxford: Clarendon Press, 1997).
- Murray Smith and Steve Neale (eds), Contemporary Hollywood Cinema (London: Routledge, 1998).
- Murray Smith, Trainspotting (London: BFI Modern Classics, 2002).
- Murray Smith and Thomas E. Wartenberg (eds), Thinking Through Cinema: Film as Philosophy (Cambridge, MA: Blackwell, 2006).
- Murray Smith, Film, Art, and the Third Culture: A Naturalized Aesthetics of Film (Oxford: Oxford University Press, 2017).

== Selected articles ==
- 'Feeling Prufish,' Midwest Studies in Philosophy, 2010, 34 (1): 261–279.
- 'Film Theory Meets Analytic Philosophy; Or, Film Studies And L’Affaire Sokal,' Cinema, 2010, 1 (1): 111–117.
- 'Film Art, Argument, and Ambiguity,' Journal of Aesthetics and Art Criticism, 2006, 64 (1): 33–42.
- 'The Bad and the Beautiful'. Film-Philosophy. 2002, 6 (1).
- 'Rhetoric and Representation in Non-Fiction Film,' British Journal of Aesthetics, 2001, 41 (2): 222–225.
- 'Film Spectatorship and the Institution of Fiction,' Journal of Aesthetics and Art Criticism, 1995, 53 (2): 113–127.
- 'Regarding Film Spectatorship: A Reply to Richard Allen,' Journal of Aesthetics and Art Criticism, 1998, 56 (1): 63–65.
- 'The Aesthetics of Football,' with Steffen Borge and Margrethe Bruun Vaage, Sport, Ethics and Philosophy, 2015, 9 (2):93–96.
