= Noel Carroll =

Noell or Noël Carroll may refer to:

- Noel Carroll (athlete) (1941–1998), Irish middle distance runner
- Noël Carroll (born 1947), American philosopher
- Noel Carroll (footballer) (1932–2017), Australian rules footballer
