= Quality television =

Genre of television programming

Quality television (also quality TV or quality artistic television) is a term used by television scholars, television critics, and broadcasting advocacy groups to describe a genre or style of television programming that they argue is of higher quality due to its subject matter, style, or content. For several decades after World War II, television that was deemed to be "quality television" was mostly associated with government-funded public television networks; however, with the development of cable TV network specialty channels in the 1980s and 1990s, American cable channels such as HBO made a number of television shows during the turn of the century that some television critics argued were "quality television", such as Angels in America, Sex and the City, The Sopranos, The Wire and Six Feet Under.

Claims that television programs are of higher quality include a number of subjective evaluations and value judgements. For example, Robert J. Thompson's claim that "quality television" programs include "...a quality pedigree, a large ensemble cast, a series memory, creation of a new genre through recombination of older ones, self-consciousness, and pronounced tendencies toward the controversial and the realistic" includes a number of subjective evaluations. The criteria for "quality television" set out by the US group Viewers for Quality Television ("A quality show is something we anticipate...[it] focuses more on relationships...[and] explores character, it enlightens, challenges, involves and confronts the viewer; it provokes thought...") also require a number of subjective evaluations.

Television programs on another end of the spectrum from quality television are sometimes called B-television or blue collar television.

== Fictional and non-fictional "quality television" ==
Fictional television programs that some television scholars and broadcasting advocacy groups argue are "quality television" include series such as Twin Peaks, Buffy the Vampire Slayer, and The Sopranos. Kristin Thompson argues that some of these television series exhibit traits also found in art films, such as psychological realism, narrative complexity, and ambiguous plotlines. Nonfiction television programs that some television scholars and broadcasting advocacy groups argue are "quality television" include a range of serious, noncommercial programming aimed at a niche audience, such as documentaries and public affairs shows.

== Prestige drama ==
Prestige drama is a genre of television show in which the tone of the show is serious, the production values are high, and there is a complex plot across episodes. Examples of prestige drama include shows such as Breaking Bad, Game of Thrones and True Detective.

Common characteristics of prestige drama include a more sophisticated approach to cinematography than other genres, high production values, and a complex storyline. Most prestige dramas, as the name implies, are more dramatic and serious in tone.

One cause for the rise of prestige dramas is the rise in streaming video services where television creators are not limited by time slots and commercial breaks. These streaming services vie for viewer attention and spend large amounts to produce shows they hope will encourage customers to subscribe to their platform.

Prestige dramas have been criticized as being similar to one another. Most are bleak with anti-hero qualities in the primary characters. In recent years they have become cliche, with studios across the television industry creating shows with a familiar feeling.

== In the United States ==
=== Narrative complexity in television drama ===
At the dawn of the medium and in the Golden Age of Television in the 1950s, there had been complex dramas in the form of live anthology series each week such as Playhouse 90, Kraft Television Theater, Studio One, Goodyear Television Playhouse, and other such shows featuring writers along the lines of Rod Serling and Paddy Chayefsky who wrote stories about the human condition, often through a dark eye and a cynical or ironic outlook on life and social issues. These were live dramas broadcast for New York City 52 weeks with no hiatus, and such shows faded out of existence more and more with television dramas now being filmed in Los Angeles, California. However the essence and format of these dramas continued in the form of filmed anthology dramas such as Alfred Hitchcock Presents and The Twilight Zone. With anthology series now being filmed in Los Angeles, these shows were broadcast for 39 weeks with a hiatus in the summer.

The 1960s and 1970s gave rise to two complex narrative formats which would come to dominate the American television landscape decades later. The primetime serial (radio and television) with Peyton Place based on the Grace Metalious novel and the successful movie of the same name starring Lana Turner. It was the first American television series to feature a frank discussion of sexuality in dramatic storylines. It was also the first primetime series to adopt the more serialized character-driven approach to storytelling more often seen on daytime soap operas as opposed to the typical primetime series of the era which had a more episodic plot-driven nature.

The Fugitive was the first to introduce the concept of story arc and character arc, in spite of the show's episodic nature, with David Janssen playing Dr. Richard Kimble, a man on the run to prove his innocence and to reveal that a one-armed man was in fact his wife's killer. This led to a huge showdown in the final episode which resulted the broadcast being one of the most watched television programs of all time and the concept of a series finale becoming popular ratings grabbers instead of the previous method of using a clip show as a final episode. The Fugitive also spawned a feature film starring Harrison Ford and Tommy Lee Jones (who won an Academy Award for Best Supporting Actor) along with a short-lived remake of the series starring Timothy Daly.

The original Battlestar Galactica was perhaps one of the first dramatic series on American television to delve into a show mythology, long before Twin Peaks, Babylon 5, The X-Files, or Lost which involved mixing both serialized and episodic narratives in a regular television series. The premise involved a ragtag fleet of survivors from the now destroyed Twelve Colonies of Man fleeing an attack from a destructive cybernetic race called the Cylons, hoping for a utopian thirteenth colony called Earth. The series starred Lorne Greene of Bonanza fame. The series was cancelled after one season due to rising budget costs but spawned Galactica 1980 a year later, and a reimagined version of the series on The Sci Fi Channel which garnered much more recognition, critical acclaim, and a longer run than the original series or Galactica 1980. By this time, television series were 26 weeks per season with hiatuses now in both the summer and winter.

In the 1980s, both serials and story arcs made a comeback with hit primetime soaps Dallas, its spin-off Knots Landing, and their sister show Falcon Crest (all three series were produced at Lorimar) along with the Aaron Spelling–produced Dynasty; in spite of their mass appeal, campy nature, and sensationalism, these shows prompted more primetime dramas to use the serial format. Among these were dramas such as the Steven Bochco–produced shows Hill Street Blues, St. Elsewhere, L.A. Law, and later NYPD Blue and Wiseguy. These latter dramas were known for their deep characterization and multiple narrative threads. These serialized dramas without the melodramatic trappings of a soap opera helped popularize the term story arc.

In the 1990s and 2000s, a new model of television storytelling began being used in some American television programs such as Oz and The Sopranos, and later on with shows such as The Wire and Six Feet Under for HBO which adopted a business model of producing 13-week dramas over the course of five years or so. This was a marked departure from traditional network dramas which would start with thirteen episodes at the beginning of the season with another back nine episodes to finish the season, and allowed these cable dramas to have a shot at succeeding by not cancelling them within a year, but concluding them before they moved past their prime. These shows were darker and occasionally more graphic than the typical network drama, establishing dramatic television on cable as a solid alternative to network television. In the years following the end of the run of The Wire, several colleges and universities such as Johns Hopkins, Brown University, and Harvard College have offered classes on The Wire in disciplines ranging from law to sociology to film studies.

=== Views of scholars and authors ===
Robert Thompson says quality television has the following characteristics:

- It must break the established rules of television and be like nothing that has come before.
- It is produced by people of quality aesthetic ancestry, who have honed their skills in other areas, particularly film.
- It attracts a quality audience.
- It succeeds against the odds, after initial struggles.
- It has large ensemble cast which allows for multiple plot lines.
- It has memory, referring back to previous episodes and seasons in the development of plot.
- It defies genre classification.
- It tends to be literary.
- It contains sharp social and cultural criticisms with cultural references and allusions to popular culture.
- It tends toward the controversial.
- It aspires toward realism.
- Finally, it is recognized and appreciated by critics, with awards and critical acclaim.

Paul Buhle's review of Quality Popular Television states that "high-culture critics almost uniformly considered films to be dreck until television—when they enshrined the cinema auteur. At the next stage...some television... [programs were] accorded the status of "art." Some British professors and television writers argue that American television programming includes a number of quality shows. In April 2004, Janet McCabe (Manchester Metropolitan University) and Kim Akass (Manchester Metropolitan University) organized a conference on "American Quality Television" to examine the "particular strand of American television known as Quality TV" (e.g., St Elsewhere, Hill Street Blues, thirtysomething, Twin Peaks, The X-Files, Buffy the Vampire Slayer, ER, The Sopranos, Sex and the City and Six Feet Under).

The BBC’s television listings magazine, Radio Times had an article in 2002 which asked, "Why can't Britain's long-running dramas be more like America's?". David Gritten argued that the "...cream of American TV now stands for real quality", because American television dramas have "...the edge in portraying a broad gamut of human experience" and they are "...fast-paced, complex, smart and beautifully written."

Kristin Thompson, in Storytelling in Film and Television, argues that American television shows such as David Lynch's Twin Peaks series have "...a loosening of causality, a greater emphasis on psychological or anecdotal realism, violations of classical clarity of space and time, explicit authorial comment, and ambiguity." Thompson claims that series such as Buffy the Vampire Slayer, The Sopranos, and The Simpsons "...have altered long-standing notions of closure and single authorship", which means that "...television has wrought its own changes in traditional narrative form." Other television shows that have been called "art television," such as The Simpsons, use a "...flurry of cultural references, intentionally inconsistent characterization, and considerable self-reflexivity about television conventions and the status of the programme as a television show." Kristin Thompson compares David Lynch's film Blue Velvet and the television series Twin Peaks and "...asks whether there can be an "art television" comparable to the more familiar "art cinema." An art film is typically a serious, noncommercial, independently made film that is aimed at a niche audience, rather than a mass audience. Film critics and film studies scholars typically define an "art film" using a "...canon of films and those formal qualities that mark them as different from mainstream Hollywood films."

Jason Mittell, an associate professor of American studies and film and media culture at Middlebury College, notes that many of the innovative television programs of the past twenty years have come from creators who launched their careers in film, a medium with more traditional cultural cachet, such as David Lynch, Barry Levinson, Aaron Sorkin, Joss Whedon, Alan Ball, and J. J. Abrams.

=== Viewers for Quality Television ===
In the United States, an organization called Viewers for Quality Television was formed in the 1980s to encourage the production and broadcasting of shows that the group argued were "quality television". The group polls their membership and builds consensus through a monthly newsletter. The group's founder, Dorothy Swanson, argued that "A 'quality show' is something we anticipate before and savor after. It focuses more on relationships than situations; it explores character, it enlightens, challenges, involves and confronts the viewer; it provokes thought and is remembered tomorrow. A quality show colors life in shades of grey."

For the group-supported comedy shows such as Frank's Place, Designing Women, or Brooklyn Bridge, and dramas such as ER, Murder One or NYPD Blue, the group's annual rankings were monitored by broadcast industry executives, as the rankings showed the preferences of the so-called "high demographic" programming that appeals to university-educated, higher-income television viewers, a niche audience that is sought out by advertisers.

As television shows become increasingly as popular as DVD rentals and purchases, media industries have been attempting to increase the "rewatchability" of programs. If a television program has a simple plot that can be understood in a single viewing, viewers will be less likely to want to purchase a DVD recording of this television show. However, if a show provides a complex narrative construction and richly detailed content, viewers will be more inclined to want to "rewatch episodes or segments to parse out complex moments."

As well, the "...rise of narrative complexity has also seen the rise in amateur television criticism, as sites like televisionwithoutpity.com have emerged to provide thoughtful and humorous commentaries on weekly episodes." According to Steven Johnson, narratively complex television shows provide viewers with a "cognitive workout" that can help to increase their "...problem-solving and observational" skills.

== In the United Kingdom ==
In the United Kingdom, television plays from the 1950s and 1960s tackled a range of controversial subjects yet still managed to garner large audiences. These televised plays were regarded as a benchmark of high-quality British television drama, part of what some television historians refer to as the "golden age" of British television. British television drama writer John Hopkins has been noted for "...successful[ly] pioneering...the short series for serious drama," which "...established an important precedent in Britain" and served as a model for subsequent television writers such as Dennis Potter and Alan Bleasdale.

The UK's National Film and Television School (NFTS), which teaches creative and commercial skills, notes the "... tension which has given us popular cinema, serious as well as entertaining television, and allowed both media to become art forms in their own right." The British public broadcaster-produced series' The Jewel in the Crown and Brideshead Revisited "...came to represent the 'acme of British quality'" and the Jewel in the Crown was "...held up as the epitome of excellence" and described as the "title everyone reaches for when asked for a definition of "quality television".

The Arts Council of England's event "Day of British Film" states that the council's "top priority is to make strategic interventions in programme-making for network television broadcast... by co-producing "...programmes made by independent producers with television partners." The Art Film Festival examined television issues such as "Short-length programming: art in the age of satellite television", which examines "...ways in which contemporary, often aesthetically difficult work can be presented on network television in ways that are innovative but accessible." Kristin Thompson argues that a show from the British public broadcaster, The Singing Detective, has what she defines as "art television" aspects similar to those that she finds in Lynch's Twin Peaks series.

David Lavery has written a number of articles and book chapters on television that he argues is "quality television." He co-edited Twin Peaks in the Rearview Mirror: Appraisals and Reappraisals of the Show That Was Supposed to Change TV and wrote "Quirky Quality TV: Revisiting Northern Exposure." (from Critical Studies in Television 1.2 (Autumn 2006): 34-38). In April 2004, Janet McCabe and Kim Akass organized a conference on "American Quality Television" (described above in the section on the United States) and have recently published a book Quality TV: Contemporary American Television and Beyond (November 2007, I.B. Tauris). This collection is part of their Reading Contemporary Television series and, along with their contributors, they discuss various definitions of Quality TV.

Unlike the above-cited scholars, who discuss the contributions made by fictional television programs that they deem to be "quality television", Dieter Daniels argues that there "...is no form of high television culture that could be seen as a lasting cultural asset to be preserved for future generations", except for the "music clip." Daniels' article, "Television—Art or Anti-art?", states the music clips (e.g., music videos) that "have emerged since the 1980s" have "...attracted accolades in the context of art and become part of museum collections", and that they "...are often seen as a continuation of the 1920s avant-garde absolute films.

== In Canada ==
Television broadcasting in Canada is strongly influenced by the British and American broadcasting systems. The Canadian broadcasting system's legislative foundation, the Broadcasting Act, and its public broadcaster, the Canadian Broadcasting Corporation, are both modeled on the British broadcasting system and its use of a government-funded public broadcaster. In addition, the Canadian broadcasting system is influenced by the American broadcasting system. Most Canadians receive a number of American channels, either through over-the-air broadcasting (e.g., in border cities such as Windsor) or in cable TV packages. As well, Canadian commercial broadcasters' schedules are dominated by popular American shows.

Shows deemed to be "quality television" in Canada are usually produced and broadcast by the public broadcaster (CBC) or by the provincial educational broadcasters, such as Ontario's TVO, Saskatchewan's SCN, the BC Knowledge, and Quebec's Télé-Québec.

== The Youth Media Alliance/Alliance Médias Jeunesse ==
The Youth Media Alliance/Alliance Médias Jeunesse (YMAMJ) is a Canadian non-profit organization that uses advocacy, awards ceremonies and other recognition, and professional training to promote Canadian children’s media. YMAMJ lobbies governments about the issue of children's screen-based entertainment. YMAMJ encourages the production of high-quality programs and advocates the production and airing of the largest possible number high-quality programs for Canadian children and youth.

The YMAMJ "statement of quality" provided the foundation for the Children's Television Charter, which is currently being ratified by governments and broadcasters around the world. YMAMJ argues that "quality television is television deemed excellent in both form and content, geared to the needs and expectations of its target viewers while meeting recognized industry standards." Furthermore, the organization claims that "the content of programs should be relevant and entertaining, stimulate the intellect and the imagination, and foster openness toward others. It should also be an accurate reflection of the world in which children grow up, respecting their dignity and promoting learning."

== List of shows cited as quality television ==
- Twin Peaks
- The Sopranos
- The Wire
- House of Cards
- Buffy the Vampire Slayer
- Breaking Bad
- The Americans
- Game of Thrones

== See also ==
- Art film
- Cinephilia
- Golden Age of Television (1947–1960)
- Golden Age of Television (2000s–2023)
- Humanitas Prize and List of Humanitas Prize recipients
- Peabody Award
- MTM Enterprises
- New Hollywood – cinema's maturity to art and departure from Golden Age of Hollywood from the late 1960s to the early 1980s
- News broadcasting
- Oscar bait
- Classical Hollywood cinema
- List of comedy-drama television series
- American independent cinema
