= Cinema studies =

Cinema studies may refer to:

- Film studies, an academic discipline that deals with various theoretical, historical, and critical approaches to films
- Film theory, an academic discipline that aims to explore the essence of the cinema and provide conceptual frameworks for understanding film's relationship to reality, the other arts, individual viewers, and society at large
