= Historical poetics =

In film studies, historical poetics is a scholarly approach to studying film, which David Bordwell outlined in his book Making Meaning (1989). Poetics studies the text itself rather than its production, reception or cultural significance and it can therefore be seen as a logical first step – though expressly not the last step – in terms of understanding how a narrative text (i.e. a television series or a film) works.

== Overview ==
Bordwell argues that theory-driven, interpretative approaches should be eschewed and argued that historical poetics was a better approach to studying film. Bordwell argues that "[a]ny inquiry into the fundamental principles by which a work in any representational medium is constructed can fall within the domain of poetics." Henry Jenkins makes a distinction between descriptive poetics and prescriptive poetics where the former examine "how artworks have been constructed" and the latter make a case for "how artworks should be constructed." Much of Bordwell's own research falls within the former category while an example of the latter is the Dogme 95 Manifesto by Danish directors Lars von Trier and Thomas Vinterberg.

Bordwell's research into the stylistic changes in Hollywood cinema demonstrates four specific changes: the use of more rapid editing, an increasingly frequent use of very long or very short lenses, a more prevalent use of close shots, and more camera movement.

Historical poetics and neoformalism are part of the "post-theory" trend in film studies. Bordwell has repeatedly argued that some approaches — ones based in "Grand Theories" — do not study films per se but instead use films to confirm predetermined theoretical frameworks. He and Noël Carroll coined the term "S.L.A.B. theory" which refers to theorists Saussure, Lacan, Althusser, and Barthes. Historical poetics is considered to be related to cognitive film theory.

== See also ==
- Descriptive poetics
- Hermeneutics
- Linguistic film theory
- Philosophy of film
- Poetics
- Poetics of Cinema
