= Parveen Adams =

British psychoanalytic theorist and feminist

Parveen Adams (born 1939) is a British psychoanalytic theorist and feminist. She was a cofounder, editor and contributor to the British socialist feminist journal m/f. Since then she has moved to apply psychoanalytic notions to art criticism.

== Life ==
In the 1970s Adams was in a Lacanian reading group with the artist Mary Kelly, and was interested in using Lacanian psychoanalysis to link sexual politics to the Marxist (Althusserian) notion of ideology. In 1976 she collaborated with Kelly, Laura Mulvey and Sue Lipschitz in leading an ICA seminar defending their use of Lacan against the accusation that he was a patriarchal theorist. In 1978 Adams cofounded m/f with Elizabeth Cowie. She continued to be involved with the journal as editor and contributor through its publication from 1978 to 1986. She taught psychoanalysis, and directed the MA in Psychoanalytic Studies, at the Department of Human Sciences at Brunel University. She was also on the teaching staff of the London Consortium. In 2002 she was a visiting fellow at the Centre for the Study of Culture and Society in Bangalore. She has served on the board of the Journal of Lacanian Studies and Savoir et Clinique.

== Works ==
- (ed.) Language in thinking: selected readings. Harmondsworth: Penguin, 1972.
- 'Of Female Bondage', in Teresa Brennan, ed., Between Feminism and Psychoanalysis, London & New York: Routledge, 1989.
- (ed. with Elizabeth Cowie) The Women in Question: m/f. Cambridge, Mass.: MIT Press, 1990.
- 'The Art of Analysis: Mary Kelly's Interim and the Discourse of the Analyst'. October 58 (1991), pp. 81–96.
- The emptiness of the image: psychoanalysis and sexual differences. London & New York: Routledge, 1996.
- (ed.) Art: sublimation or symptom. London & New York: Karnac, 2003.
