= Stephen Mulhall =

British Professor of Philosophy (born 1962)

- Born: 1962 (age 63–64)

Education
- Education: Balliol College, Oxford; All Souls College, Oxford

Philosophical work
- Era: 21st-century philosophy
- Region: Western philosophy
- School: Continental philosophy, postanalytic philosophy
- Institutions: New College, Oxford
- Main interests: Wittgenstein studies, ethics, philosophy of religion, post-Kantian philosophy, philosophy of literature, philosophy of film
- Notable ideas: Linguistic film theory Experience of meaning

Stephen Mulhall (/ˈmʌlhɔːl/; born 1962) is a British philosopher and Fellow of New College, Oxford. His main research areas are Ludwig Wittgenstein and post-Kantian philosophy.

== Education and career ==
Stephen Mulhall received a BA in Philosophy, Politics, and Economics at Balliol College, Oxford in 1983. He then pursued an MA in philosophy from the University of Toronto in 1984, during which time he spent several weeks studying under Sir Isaiah Berlin at Harvard. Between 1984 and 1988, he attended Balliol College and All Souls College, Oxford for his DPhil in Philosophy. From 1986 to 1991 he was a Prize Fellow at All Souls College and in 1991 he became a Reader of Philosophy at the University of Essex. From 1998 to the present he has been a fellow at New College, Oxford.

In 2008, Mulhall was awarded the title of Professor of Philosophy, one of the Titles of Distinction granted by the University of Oxford. He has published extensively on Wittgenstein, Heidegger, and the American philosopher Stanley Cavell. Professor Judith Wolfe, a former student of Mulhall's at Oxford, examines Mulhall's thought in relation to Cavell and others.

== Books ==
- 1990 On Being in the World: Wittgenstein and Heidegger on Seeing Aspects (Routledge)
- 1992 Liberals and Communitarians (Blackwell) - with Adam Swift
- 1994 Stanley Cavell: Philosophy’s Recounting of the Ordinary (OUP)
- 1994 Faith and Reason (Duckworth)
- 1996 Heidegger and Being and Time (Routledge)
- 1996 Liberals and Communitarians: A Revised Edition (Blackwell) - with Adam Swift
- 1996 The Cavell Reader (Blackwell) - editor
- 2001 Inheritance and Originality: Wittgenstein, Heidegger, Kierkegaard (OUP)
- 2002 On Film, London/New York: Routledge, 2002. ISBN 0-415-24795-0 ISBN 9780415247955
- 2005 Philosophical Myths of the Fall (Princeton)
- 2005 Heidegger and Being and Time (second edition)
- 2006 Martin Heidegger International Library of Essays in the History of Social and Political Thought (Ashgate) - editor
- 2006 Wittgenstein's Private Language (OUP)
- 2007 The Conversation of Humanity (University of Virginia Press)
- 2008 On Film (second edition; Routledge)
- 2008 The Wounded Animal: J. M. Coetzee and the Difficulty of Reality (Princeton)
- 2013 The Self and Its Shadows: A Book of Essays on Individuality as Negation in Philosophy and the Arts (OUP)
- 2014 On Being in the World: Wittgenstein and Heidegger on Seeing Aspects (second edition; Routledge)
- 2015 The Great Riddle: Wittgenstein and Nonsense, Theology and Philosophy (OUP)
- 2021 The Ascetic Ideal: Genealogies of Life-Denial in Religion, Morality, Art, Science, and Philosophy (OUP)
- 2023 In Other Words: Transpositions of Philosophy in J.M. Coetzee's 'Jesus' Trilogy (OUP)
