= M/f (feminist magazine) =

Defunct British feminist periodical

m/f
- Editor: Parveen Adams, Rosalind Coward, Elizabeth Cowie, Beverley Brown
- Categories: Feminism
- Frequency: Biannually
- First issue: 1978
- Final issue: 1986
- Country: United Kingdom
- Website: mffeministjournal.co.uk
- ISSN: 0141-948X
- OCLC: 931732837

m/f: a feminist journal was a British feminist periodical published from 1978 until 1986. The magazine published theoretical and political reviews, discussions, and articles about the women's movement, particularly in relation to socialist and feminist politics.

== Background and content ==
Following the Patriarchy Conference in London in May 1976, m/f was established to provide a space for theoretical debates and discussions within the women's movement. Its earliest editors included Parveen Adams, Rosalind Coward and Elizabeth Cowie. They were later joined by Beverley Brown.

In the introduction to issue 1 the title m/f is not explicitly defined but there are several references to marxist feminism. Contemporary Culture Index describes m/f as "a title primarily standing for masculine/feminine" and states that "readers wondered if this oblique title could also mean Marxism versus feminism, mother versus father, or even, if it could be a coded reference to Michel Foucault."

The magazine took multidisciplinary approaches and various perspectives: legal, social, psychoanalytical, economic, as well as artistic. m/f primarily aligned itself with feminist socialism while also recognizing the limitations and risks of essentialism. Publishing a total of twelve issues, m/f was an academically dense project that explored the complexity of the theoretical and political considerations of women. Though short-lived, many scholars and readers have regarded the contributions of m/f in feminist discourse, both its successes and shortcomings.

In 1979 Diana Leonard discussed m/f along with Women's Studies International Quarterly and Feminist Review in a paper "Is Feminism More Complex than the WLM Realises?". She "reserved special criticism for m/f ... because of its psychoanalytic and post-structuralist lens".

In 1990, Adams and Cowie edited The Woman In Question, a collection of essays and editorials from m/f.
