= Cinema and Death: on Image and Immortality =

Book by Milad Roshani Payan

Cinema and Death: on Image and Immortality (سینما و مرگ: درباره نامیرایی و تصویر / Sīnimā va marg : darbārah-ʼi nāmīrāyī va taṣvīr) is a Persian book on philosophy of film, written by Milad Roshani Payan. in February 2020, the book won the highest award in the most prestigious book award in Iran, called Iran's Book of the Year Awards, in dramatic arts category.

== summary ==
The book is divided into six chapters, and in each chapter, the relationship between cinema and death is examined.
