= Ivan Esaulov =

Ivan A. Esaulov is the author of numerous articles and five monographs, of which the most recent are Paschal’nost’ russokoj slovesnosti (Paschal’nost’ of Russian Literature) (2004), Kategoriia sobornosti v russkoi literature (The Category of Sobornost’ in Russian Literature) (1995), and Spektr adekvatnosti v istolkovanii literaturnogo proizvedenija (The Spectrum of Adequacy in the Interpretation of the Literary Work) (1997). He was also an editor of the periodical Postsymbolizm kak javlenie kul’tury (1995–2003) and founder of the web site www.postsymbolism.ru. His main area of specialization is in poetics of Old Russian and Russian literature, and the philosophy of religion.

== Articles in English ==
- 'The Categories of Law and Grace in Dostoevsky's Poetics', in Dostoevsky and the Christian Tradition, ed. D.O. Thompson (Cambridge: Cambridge University Press, 2001), pp. 116-133.
- 'Sobornost' in Nineteenth-Century Russian Literature', in Cultural Discontinuity and Reconstruction, ed. J.B.I. Lunde (Oslo: Solum forlag A/S, 1997), pp. 29-45.
- 'Two Facets of Comedic Space in Russian Literature of the Modern Period: Holy Foolishness and Buffoonery', in Reflective Laughter: Aspects of Humour in Russian Culture, ed. L. Milne (London: Anthem Press, 2004), pp. 73-84.
- 'Crusifixion of the Resurrected and the Paschal Archetype of Russian Culture', in Celebrating Creativity: Essays in Honour of Jostein Boertnes, ed. I. Lunde (Bergen: University of Bergen, 1997), pp. 271-278.
- 'The Paschal Archetype of Russian Literature and the Structure of Boris Pasternak's Novel Doctor Zhivago', Literature & Theology 20 (Oxford: Oxford University Press, 2006), 63-78.
