= Formalist film theory =

Emphasis on style & form over content or possible meanings of films

Formalist film theory is an approach to film theory that is focused on the formal or technical elements of a film: i.e., the lighting, scoring, sound and set design, use of color, shot composition, and editing. This approach was proposed by Hugo Münsterberg, Rudolf Arnheim, Sergei Eisenstein, and Béla Balázs. Today, formalist film theory is a recognized approach in film studies.

== Formalism in ideological approaches ==
=== Classical Hollywood cinema ===
Classical Hollywood cinema uses a style referred to as the institutional mode of representation: continuity editing, massive coverage, three-point lighting, "mood" music, and dissolves. The socio-economic ideological explanation for this is style involves desire to profit and appeal to ticket-buyers.

=== Film noir ===
Film noir is marked by lower production values, darker images, under lighting, location shooting, and general nihilism. This is largely due to the pessimistic outlook filmmakers and filmgoers expressed during the war and post-war years. In the following decades, many German Expressionists immigrated to America. Their stylized lighting effects and themes of disillusionment due to the war left an impact on Film noir and classical Hollywood films.

== See also ==
- Clement Greenberg
- Clive Bell
- Formalism (art)
- Medium specificity
- Neoformalism (film theory)
- Russian formalism
- Structuralist film theory
