= Institutional mode of representation =

In film theory, the institutional mode of representation (IMR) is the dominant mode of film construction, which developed in the years after the turn of the century, becoming the norm by about 1914. Although virtually all films produced today are made within the IMR, it is not the only possible mode of representation. Other possibilities include the primitive mode of representation, which was dominant before being replaced by the IMR; certain avant-garde films that constitute a “deconstructionist” challenge to the IMR; and various non-western modes, notably pre-war Japanese film, that were possible before the IMR became the worldwide norm. Classical Hollywood cinema is the dominant style within the IMR, but other styles such as art house, independent, and most (current) foreign styles fall no less under the IMR.

== Overview ==
The concept was developed by Noël Burch in his 1969 book Praxis du cinéma. Burch's goal is to show that the IMR was a class-determined practice, developed out of the bourgeois desire for totalizing illusionistic representation. André Bazin had identified the “myth of total cinema,” or a constant desire to represent reality as completely as possible, which he claimed as the root of cinema innovations (both technology such as sound, color, and widescreen as well as techniques such as more elaborate editing). Burch, on the other hand, argues that IMR is no more elaborate or realistic a system than its alternatives.

The IMR is characterized by the attempt to create an entirely closed fictional world on screen. The audience is completely imaginatively involved in the film, instead of being distant from it and seeing it as an object to be examined. Burch argues that the key to the IMR is "spectatorial identification with a ubiquitous camera." Various techniques (often referred to as the “language of cinema”) were developed in order to accomplish this identification:

- Films are constructed out of a sequence of shots, each of which presents the viewer with one clear piece of information. In contrast to the Primitive Mode, IMR therefore uses close-ups.
- A three-dimensional space is created, using Renaissance rules of perspective as well as new cinematic techniques such as editing and lighting. To preserve the illusion of spatial integrity, which was lost with the introduction of close-ups, eye-line and directional matches were introduced. The film is thus perceived as taking place in an environment around the viewer.
- Characters are psychologically individuated, through close-ups on faces and acting methods borrowed from (bourgeois) theater. Psychological depth is prized, and the narrative is driven by character psychology. The audience is therefore invited to interpret the motivations of the characters, and thus involve itself with the film.

== See also ==
- Formalist film theory
