= Mary Ann Doane =

Film scholar and feminist

Mary Ann Doane (born 1952) is the Class of 1937 Professor of Film and Media at the University of California, Berkeley and was previously the George Hazard Crooker Professor of Modern Culture and Media at Brown University. She is a pioneer in the study of gender in film.

In 1974, Doane received a B.A. in English from Cornell University and in 1979, earned her Ph.D. in Speech and Dramatic Art from the University of Iowa. Doane specializes in film theory, feminist theory and semiotics, and she joined the UC Berkeley Film and Media faculty in the fall of 2011.

== As a film theorist ==
Doane is best known for her collection of essays Femmes Fatales: Feminism, Film Theory, Psychoanalysis. The essays in this book examine the ways in which women are misrepresented and alienated in films. The articles have appeared in academic journals such as Screen, Discourse, Camera Obscura, and the anthology Psychoanalysis and Cinema.

Doane argues that Classical Hollywood cinema was produced, moderated, and controlled by the male spectator's views. Thus, most of the female characters are a representation of their desires or fears. She gives the example of the femme fatale, a female stock character that often appears in the film noir genre. The femme fatale is often portrayed as an evil force trying to deceive the male protagonist, and she is usually punished or killed because of this. Doane claims this is a "desperate reassertion of control on the part of the threatened male subject." This is debated among film theorists, but Doane argues that the femme fatale is not an empowered female character. She is a projection of masculine insecurities and should not be viewed as a character with agency.

In Film and the Masquerade: Theorising the Female Spectator, Doane agrees with Laura Mulvey on cinema catering to male pleasures and the male gaze. She argues that women are too close to the object of the gaze; they struggle between feminine and masculine viewing positions, “invoking the metaphor of the transvestite.” As a result of having to adopt male viewpoints, women are more fluid in terms of sexuality and gender. Women must "'masculinize' their spectatorship" to avoid masochism (from over-identification) or narcissism (from becoming their own object of desire), and because of this, Doane claims "womanliness is a mask which can be worn and removed".

Doane has also written, published, and co-edited numerous other articles and books, including The Desire to Desire: The Woman's Films of the 1940s and The Emergence of Cinematic Time: Modernity, Contingency, the Archive.

== Awards ==
In 1990, Doane won the Guggenheim Fellowship for Humanities, U.S. and Canada for her work in film, video, and radio studies. In 2016 she was a fellow at the American Academy in Berlin. Also, her book, The Emergence of Cinematic Time: Modernity, Contingency, the Archive, won the Limina award.
