= Kristin Thompson =

American film theorist

- Born: 1950 (age 75–76); United States
- Occupations: Film theorist, author
- Spouse: David Bordwell (m. 1979; died 2024)

Kristin Thompson (born 1950) is an American film theorist and author whose research interests include the close formal analysis of films, the history of film styles, and "quality television," a genre akin to art film. She wrote two scholarly books in the 1980s which used an analytical technique called neoformalism. She also co-authored two widely used film studies textbooks with her husband David Bordwell.

== Career ==
=== 1970s and 1980s ===
Thompson earned her master's degree in film studies at the University of Iowa (1973) and a Ph.D. in film studies at the University of Wisconsin–Madison. She has held teaching positions at the University of Wisconsin, the University of Iowa, Indiana University, the University of Amsterdam, and the University of Stockholm.

She co-wrote the film textbook, Film Art: An Introduction, with her husband David Bordwell. Film Art, with a 12th edition published in 2019, was first published in 1979 and has become a standard in the field of film aesthetics. As of 2024, it has been translated into twelve languages.

Thompson predominantly relies on an analytical method drawn from Russian Formalism known as neoformalism. This method formed the basis for her dissertation, which subsequently became her first scholarly book, Eisenstein's "Ivan the Terrible": A Neoformalist Analysis. Neoformalism is also the basis for her later book, Breaking the Glass Armor.

=== 1990s and 2000s ===
In 1994, she co-wrote another textbook with Bordwell, Film History. In early 2001 she gave a series of lectures at Oxford University. She holds an honorary fellowship in the Department of Communication Arts at the University of Wisconsin–Madison.

=== Quality television ===
Thompson argues that a small number of television shows stand out as quality television shows, due to their use of "a quality pedigree, a large ensemble cast, a series memory, creation of a new genre through recombination of older ones, self-consciousness, and pronounced tendencies toward the controversial and the realistic." She claims that television shows such as Twin Peaks, Buffy the Vampire Slayer, The Sopranos, and The Simpsons exhibit traits also found in art films, such as psychological realism, narrative complexity, and ambiguous plotlines.

She wrote that David Lynch's Twin Peaks television series had "a loosening of causality, a greater emphasis on psychological or anecdotal realism, violations of classical clarity of space and time, explicit authorial comment, and ambiguity." She compared Lynch's film Blue Velvet and the television series Twin Peaks and asked "whether there can be an 'art television' comparable to the more familiar 'art cinema'".

Thompson pointed out that series such as Buffy the Vampire Slayer, The Sopranos, and The Simpsons "have altered longstanding notions of closure and single authorship", which means that "television has wrought its own changes in traditional narrative form." She stated that The Simpsons uses a "flurry of cultural references, intentionally inconsistent characterization, and considerable self-reflexivity about television conventions and the status of the program as a television show."

=== Lord of the Rings ===
In the mid-2000s, Thompson's interest in Hollywood norms led her to write a monograph about the popular fantasy trilogy The Lord of the Rings: The Frodo Franchise: The Lord of the Rings and Modern Hollywood. According to Thompson, the book "[...] examine[s] the larger phenomenon of this hugely successful franchise, examining the film's making but also its marketing via the Internet, its merchandising (particularly DVDs and video games), and its impact on world cinema." It is based on the author's interviews with many of the artists, writers, and business people who participated in the making of The Lord of the Rings motion pictures.

== Select bibliography ==
- Thompson, Kristin (2003). Storytelling in Film and Television. Harvard University Press.
- Thompson, Kristin (1999). Storytelling in the New Hollywood: Understanding Classical Narrative Technique. Harvard University Press.
- Thompson, Kristin (1981). Eisenstein's Ivan the Terrible: A Neoformalist Analysis. Princeton University Press. ISBN 978-0-691-06472-7.
- Thompson, Kristin (1988). Breaking the Glass Armor. Princeton University Press.
- Bordwell, David; Kristin Thompson (2006). Film Art: An Introduction (Eighth ed.). New York: McGraw-Hill.
- Bordwell, David; Janet Staiger; Kristin Thompson (1985). The Classical Hollywood Cinema: Film Style and Mode of Production to 1960. New York: Columbia University Press.
- Bordwell, David; Kristin Thompson (2002) [1994]. Film History: An Introduction. New York: McGraw-Hill.

== See also ==
- Quality television
