= Janet Staiger =

Professor of Communication

Janet Staiger (/ˈstaɪɡər/) is an American academic whose work is based in media studies. She is the William P. Hobby Centennial Professor Emeritus of Communication in the Department of Radio-Television-Film and Professor Emeritus of Women's and Gender Studies at the University of Texas at Austin.

== Education ==
Staiger attended the University of Nebraska at Omaha beginning in 1964 and graduated summa cum laude with a B.A. in English and Speech in 1968. She completed her M.A. in English at Purdue University the following year in 1969, and her Ph.D. in Communication Arts at the University of Wisconsin, Madison from 1977 to 1981.

== Career ==
Throughout her career, Staiger has held various teaching positions at a number of universities, including University of Nebraska at Omaha, University of Wisconsin-Madison, University of Delaware, New York University, and University of Texas-Austin. She has written and edited many academic books, including the textbook The Classical Hollywood Cinema: Film Style and Mode of Production to 1960, which she co-authored with David Bordwell and Kristin Thompson.

Staiger received the 2025 Distinguished Career Achievement Award from the Society for Cinema and Media Studies.

== Bibliography ==
- Political Emotions co-ed. with Ann Cvetkovich and Ann Reynolds (Routledge, 2010)
- Convergence Media History co-ed. with Sabine Hake (Routledge, 2008)
- Media Reception Studies (New York University, 2005)
- Authorship and Film co-ed. with David Gerstner (Routledge, 2003)
- Perverse Spectators: The Practices of Film Reception (New York University Press, 2000)
- Blockbuster TV: Must-See Sitcoms in the Network Era (New York University Press, 2000)
- Bad Women: Regulating Sexuality in Early American Cinema (University of Minnesota Press, 1995)
- The Studio System (ed.) (Rutgers University Press, 1995)
- Interpreting Films: Studies in the Historical Reception of American Cinema (Princeton University Press, 1992)
- The Classical Hollywood Cinema: Film Style and Mode of Production to 1960, co-author with David Bordwell and Kristin Thompson (Routledge & Kegan Paul/Columbia University Press, 1985)
