= The Velvet Light Trap =

- Discipline: film and media studies
- Language: English

Publication details
- History: 1971 to present
- Publisher: University of Texas Press for The University of Texas at Austin and the University of Wisconsin–Madison (United States)
- Frequency: Biannual

Standard abbreviations
- ISO 4: Velv. Light Trap

Indexing
- ISSN: 0149-1830 (print); 1542-4251 (web)

Links
- Journal homepage; Project MUSE; University of Texas Press Journals

The Velvet Light Trap is a peer-reviewed academic journal covering film and media studies. It is edited by graduate students at the University of Wisconsin–Madison and the University of Texas at Austin.

Each issue covers critical, theoretical, and historical topics relating to a particular theme.

== History ==
The Velvet Light Trap was established as a quarterly journal in 1971 by film lovers in Madison, Wisconsin, including graduate students at the University of Wisconsin–Madison. Russell Campbell served as editor-in-chief. In 1973, John Davis and Susan Dalton took over as editors, and Davis became the publisher. The journal's name originates from a specific part of the film camera that keeps the light out where the magazine is attached. In its earliest years, The Velvet Light Trap served the local film community with a journal that emphasized American film history. It drew upon the talents of the graduate students at the University of Wisconsin–Madison but it was not an official university publication. As the journal increased its circulation, it spread beyond the local community.

By the mid-1970s, The Velvet Light Trap had established a reputation for scholarly research, with faculty from around the United States publishing articles in special issues such as "RKO Radio Pictures", "MGM", and "Warners Revisited". The Velvet Light Trap often attempted to define the styles and genres that distinguished individual Hollywood studios. Access to primary documents at the Wisconsin Center for Film and Theater Research led to special interests such as the blacklist period (1947-1960s).

In 1989, the journal changed publishers, moving to the University of Texas Press. As part of the deal with the journal's founders, UT graduate students would collectively co-edit the journal along with Madison students. With the move to the UT Press, the journal established an international advisory editorial board and instituted blind peer review. The biannual format of Madison publishing an issue in the fall and Texas publishing an issue in the spring still stands.

== See also ==
- List of film periodicals
