= Descriptive poetics =

Analytic approach within literary studies

Descriptive poetics is an analytic approach within literary studies. While the concept of poetics goes back to Aristotle, the term "descriptive poetics" refers to an approach which, according to Brian McHale, represents a middle ground between theoretically oriented approaches and analyses of individual works of literature. David Gorman writes that "If criticism is the study of literary works, poetics is the study of the features of those works, that is, the properties they can share: [...] its topic is any shared or shareable feature of literary works."

== Overview ==
To McHale, the purpose of descriptive poetics is to give exhaustive accounts of different kinds of objects which can be a group of texts, the entire production of a single author, a particular genre, the style of a period in literary history or even specific styles of literature. McHale argues that the approach is not defined by what it examines but by the level of generalization achieved in this form of literary studies. The approach was given a formalized forum in the journal PTL: A Journal of Descriptive Poetics and Theory of Literature which only had a short run before it was succeeded by the more successful journal Poetics Today. According to literary scholar Uni Margolin, descriptive poetics was a rather prominent form of scholarship in the first half of the 20th century, especially in Germany, but has since "been neglected since 1968 because of its low level of theoretisation".

== See also ==
- Poetics
- Historical poetics

== Literature ==
- Harshav, Benjamin (2007) Explorations in Poetics. Stanford, CA: Stanford University Press.
- Olsen, Stein Haugom (1976) "What is Poetics?", The Philosophical Quarterly 26:105, pp. 338–351.
