= Elizabeth Cowie =

British author

Elizabeth Cowie (/ˈkaʊi/ KOW-ee) is a British academic, author, and emeritus professor of film studies at the University of Kent.

== Biography ==
Cowie has a degree in history, politics and sociology. After university, she found work in publishing, and from 1972 to 1976, was editorial assistant for Screen magazine. In 1982, Cowie joined the University of Kent to teach on its film studies programme.

Cowie has written two monographs, numerous articles in peer-reviewed journals, and contributed to various edited collections. In Representing the Woman: Psychoanalysis and Cinema (1997) she merges traditional psychoanalytic film theory with feminism (see Screen theory). In Recording Reality, Desiring the Real (2011) she examines the history of documentary film.

== Publications ==
- Representing the Woman: Psychoanalysis and Cinema (London: Palgrave Macmillan and Minneapolis: Minnesota University Press, 1997)
- Recording Reality, Desiring the Real (University of Minnesota Press, 2011)
