= Brian McHale =

American literary scholar (1952–2025)

Brian G. McHale (July 27, 1952 - July 27, 2025) was a US academic and literary theorist who wrote on a range of fiction and poetics, mainly relating to postmodernism and narrative theory. He was born at Pittsburgh, Pennsylvania, July 27th, 1952. He was Distinguished Humanities Professor of English at Ohio State University. His area of expertise was Twentieth-Century British and American Literature. He died of metastatic melanoma on July 27, 2025 (his birthday).

== Education ==
McHale was born in 1952 and raised in the South Hills of Pittsburgh, Pennsylvania, and graduated from Mt. Lebanon High School. He received his B.A. from Brown University in 1974 and his D.Phil. from Merton College, Oxford in 1979. He was a Rhodes Scholar.

== Career ==
McHale was the editor of the journal Poetics Today: International Journal for Theory and Analysis of Literature and Communication. He has taught at Tel Aviv University and West Virginia University; he was visiting professor at the University of Pittsburgh, the University of Freiburg (Germany), and the University of Canterbury (New Zealand). McHale was an honorary professor, from 2009 to 2011, at Shanghai Jiao Tong University, China. He was previously the associate editor and co-editor (until 2004) and was since 2015 the editor of the journal Poetics Today. He was co-founder, with James Phelan and David Herman, of Project Narrative, an initiative based at Ohio State University. He was the past President (2011) of The Association for the Study of the Arts of the Present, and President of The International Society for the Study of Narrative (ISSN).

He authored Postmodernist Fiction (1987), Constructing Postmodernism (1992), The Obligation toward the Difficult Whole (2004), and Introduction to Postmodernism (2015) from Cambridge Press. He co-edited with Randall Stevenson The Edinburgh Companion to Twentieth-Century Literatures in English (2006), and co-edited The Routledge Companion to Experimental Literature with Joe Bray and Alison Gibbons (2012) and The Cambridge Companion to Thomas Pynchon with Inger H. Dalsgaard and Luc Herman (2012). He wrote "What Was Postmodernism?". He also wrote about the cultural resonance of Alice in Wonderland, which he regarded as a symbol of postmodernism.

== See also ==
- Descriptive poetics
