= Noel Carroll (footballer) =

Australian rules footballer

Personal information
- Full name: Noel Patrick Carroll
- Born: 12 February 1932
- Died: 4 January 2017 (aged 84); Melbourne
- Original team: Thornbury CYMS (CYMSFA)
- Height: 178 cm (5 ft 10 in)
- Weight: 70 kg (154 lb)

Playing career^{1}
Years	Club	Games (Goals)
1951, 1953	Fitzroy	12 (1)
- ^{1} Playing statistics correct to the end of 1953.

Noel Patrick Carroll (12 February 1932 – 4 January 2017) was an Australian rules footballer who played with Fitzroy in the Victorian Football League (VFL).
