= Poetics =

Theory of literary forms and discourse

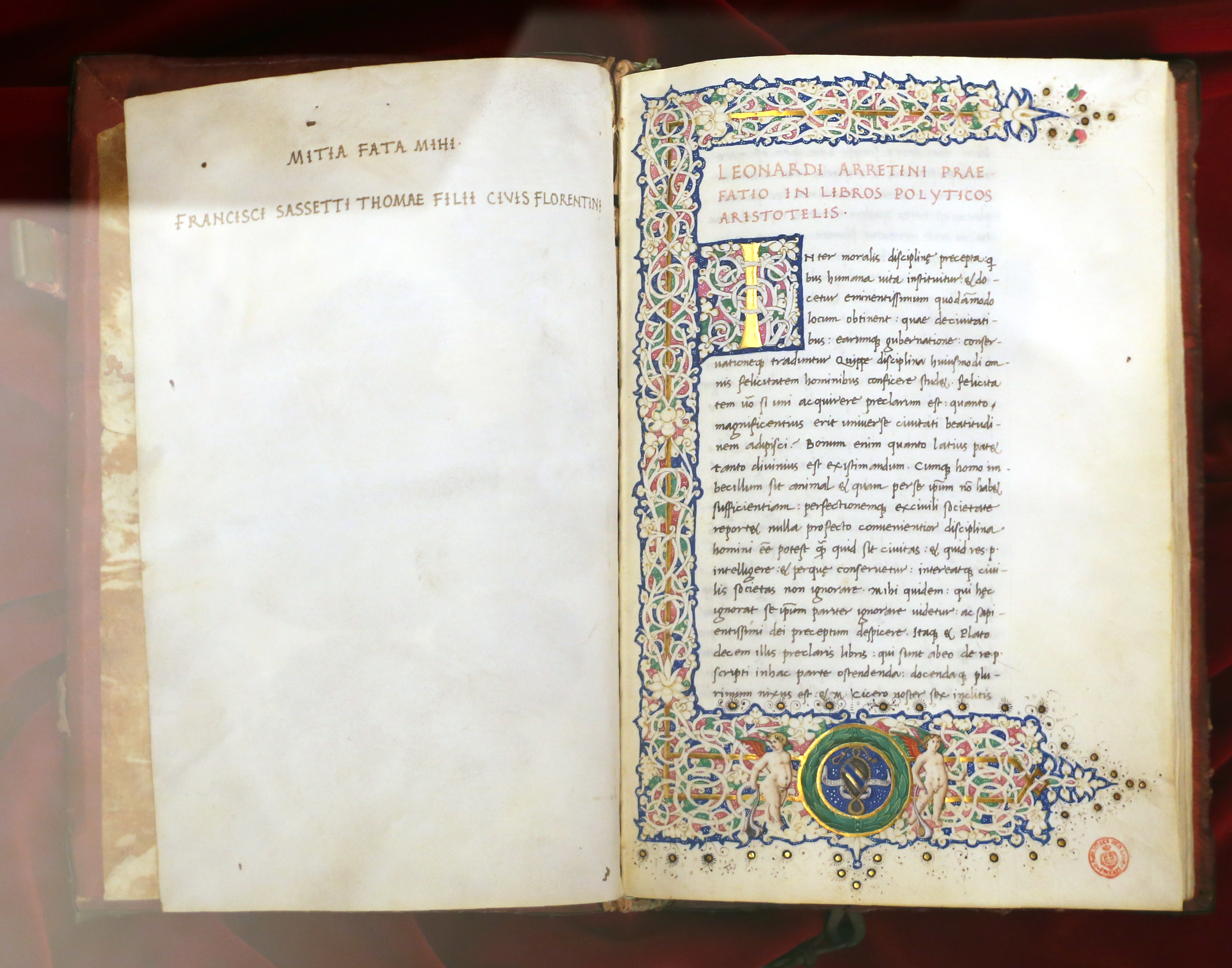
Leonardo Bruni's translation of Aristotle's Poetics

Poetics is the study or theory of literature. In a narrower case, the word refers to the study of poetry, specifically the study or theory of device, structure, form, type, and effect with regards to poetry,.

Poetics is distinguished from hermeneutics by its focus on the synthesis of non-semantic elements in a text rather than its semantic interpretation. Most literary criticism combines poetics and hermeneutics in a single analysis; however, one or the other may predominate given the text and the aims of the one doing the reading.

== History of Poetics ==
=== Western Poetics ===
Generally speaking, poetics in the Western tradition emerged out of Ancient Greece. Fragments of Homer and Hesiod represent the earliest Western treatments of poetic theory, followed later by the work of the lyricist Pindar. The term poetics derives from the Ancient Greek ποιητικός poietikos "pertaining to poetry"; also "creative" and "productive". It stems, not surprisingly, from the word for poetry, "poiesis" (ποίησις) meaning "the activity in which a person brings something into being that did not exist before." Ποίησις itself derives from the Doric word "poiéō" (ποιέω) which translates, simply, as "to make." Poetics, then, poses the question how texts (and possibly other artifacts) are made, or should be made, i.e., it can be pursued in descriptive or normative fashion. In the Western tradition, descriptive and normative poetics can and often have been combined.

==== Plato's Republic ====
The Republic by Plato represents the first major Western work to treat the theory of poetry. In Book III Plato defines poetry as a type of narrative which takes one of three forms: the "simple," the "imitative" (mimetic), or any mix of the two. In Book X, Plato argues that poetry is too many degrees removed from the ideal form to be anything other than deceptive and, therefore, dangerous. Only capable of producing these ineffectual copies of copies, poets had no place in his utopic city.

==== Aristotle's Poetics ====
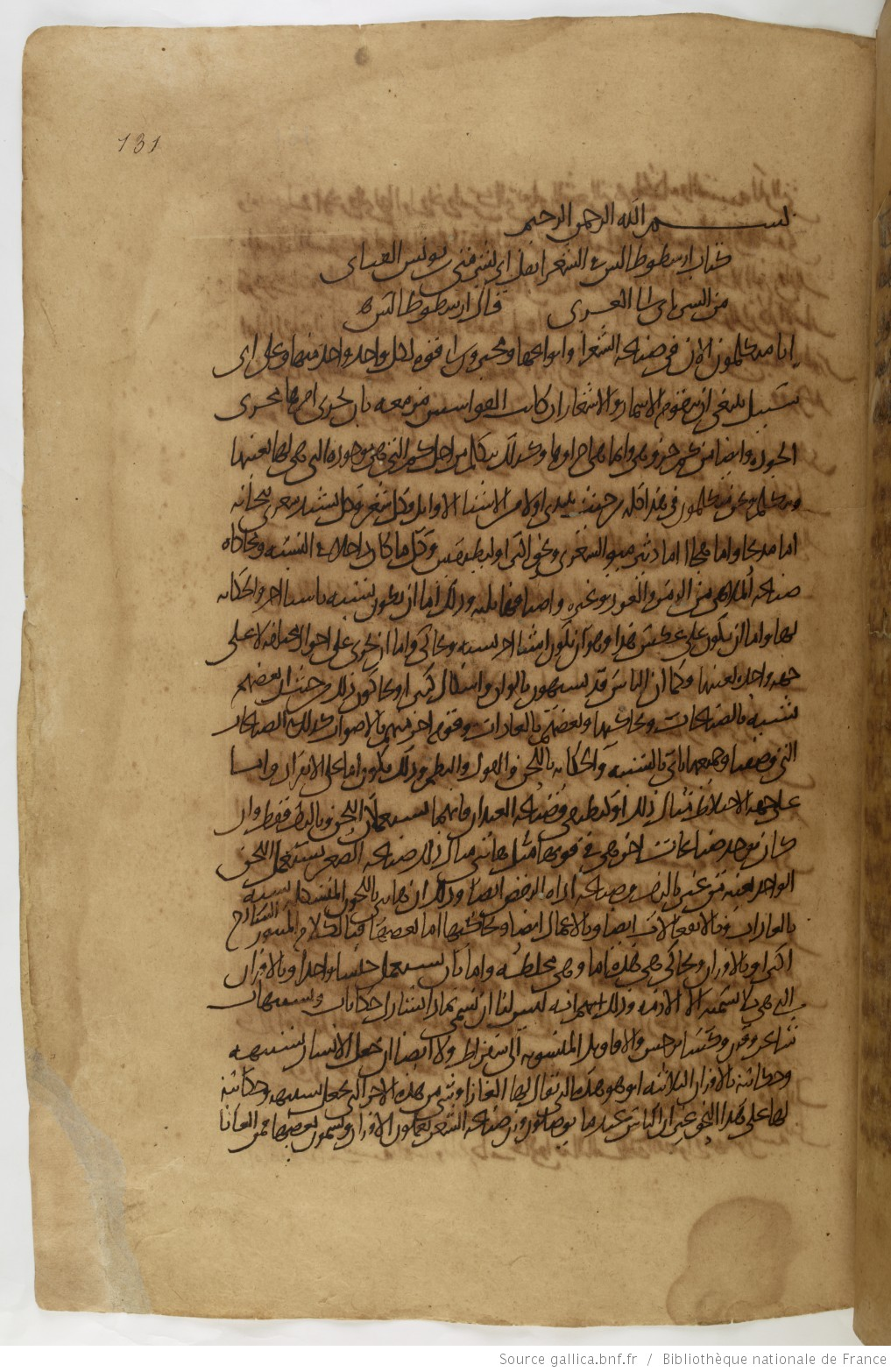
Arabic translation of Aristotle's Poetics by Abu Bishr Matta ibn Yunus

Aristotle's Poetics is one of the first extant philosophical treatise to attempt a rigorous taxonomy of literature. The work was lost to the Western world for centuries. It was available in the Middle Ages and early Renaissance only through a Latin translation of an Arabic commentary written by Averroes and translated by Hermannus Alemannus in 1256. The accurate Greek-Latin translation made by William of Moerbeke in 1278 was virtually ignored. The Arabic translation departed widely in vocabulary from the original Poetics and it initiated a misinterpretation of Aristotelian thought that continued through the Middle Ages.

The Poetics itemized the salient genres of ancient Greek drama into three categories (comedy, tragedy, and the satyr play) while drawing a larger-scale distinction between drama, lyric poetry, and the epic. Aristotle also critically revised Plato's interpretation of mimesis which Aristotle believed represented a natural human instinct for imitation, an instinct which could be found at the core of all poetry.

==== Modern Poetics ====
Modern poetics developed in Renaissance Italy. The need to interpret ancient literary texts in the light of Christianity, to appraise and assess the narratives of Dante, Petrarch, and Boccaccio, contributed to the development of complex discourses on literary theory. Thanks first of all to Giovanni Boccaccio's Genealogia Deorum Gentilium (1360), the literate elite gained a rich understanding of metaphorical and figurative tropes. Giorgio Valla's 1498 Latin translation of Aristotle's text (the first to be published) was included with the 1508 Aldine printing of the Greek original as part of an anthology of Rhetores graeci. There followed an ever-expanding corpus of texts on poetics in the later fifteenth century and throughout the sixteenth, a phenomenon that began in Italy and spread to Spain, England, and France. Among the most important Renaissance works on poetics are Marco Girolamo Vida's De Arte Poetica (1527) and Gian Giorgio Trissino's La Poetica (1529, expanded edition 1563). By the early decades of the sixteenth century, vernacular versions of Aristotle's Poetics appeared, culminating in Lodovico Castelvetro's Italian editions of 1570 and 1576. Luis de Góngora (1561–1627) and Baltasar Gracián (1601–58) brought a different kind of sophistication to poetic. Emanuele Tesauro wrote extensively in his Il Cannocchiale Aristotelico (The Aristotelian Spyglass, 1654), on figure ingeniose and figure metaforiche. During the Romantic era, poetics tended toward expressionism and emphasized the perceiving subject. Twentieth-century Western poetics returned to the Aristotelian paradigm, followed by trends toward meta-criticality, and the establishment of a contemporary theory of poetics. By contrast, Eastern poetics developed lyric poetry, rather than the representational mimetic poetry of the Western world.

== See also ==
- Outline of poetry
- Cognitive poetics
- Descriptive poetics
- Historical poetics
- Figure of speech
- Poetry analysis
- Stylistic device
- Rhetorical device
- Meter (poetry)
- Allegory
- Allusion
- Imagery
- Musical form
- Symbolist poetry
- Sound poetry
- Refrain
- Literary theory
- History of poetry
- Poetics and Linguistics Association
- Theopoetics
