= Philosophy of film =

Aesthetic approaches to the most basic philosophical questions regarding film

The philosophy of film is a branch of aesthetics within the discipline of philosophy that seeks to understand the most basic questions about film. Philosophy of film has significant overlap with film theory, a branch of film studies.

== History ==
The earliest person to explore philosophical questions regarding film was Hugo Münsterberg. During the so-called silent film era, he sought to understand what it was about film that made it conceptually distinct from theatre. He concluded that the use of close-ups, flash-backs, and edits were unique to film and constituted its nature.

Rudolf Arnheim, with the beginning of the era of synchronized sound for film, argued that earlier films were aesthetically superior to the "talkies". He held that by adding technologically synchronized sound to replace previous live-accompaniment of otherwise silent moving images, the unique status of film had been removed. Instead of being a unique art form that could carefully study bodies in motion, film had become merely a combination of two other art forms.

André Bazin, contrary to Arnheim, held that whether or not a film has sound is largely irrelevant. He believed that film, due mainly to its foundation in and relationship with photography, had a realist aspect to it. He argued that film has the ability to capture the real world. American philosopher Noël Carroll has argued that the earlier characterizations of film made by philosophers too narrowly defined the nature of film and that they incorrectly conflated aspects of genres of films with film in general.

Aspects of Bazin's realist theories have been accepted by philosophers in spite of Carroll's critique. The transparency thesis, which says that film is a medium transparent to true reality, has been accepted by Kendall Walton.

== In popular culture ==
The film Waking Life also features a discussion of the philosophy of film where the theories of Bazin are emphasized. In it, the character waxes philosophic that every moment of film is capturing an aspect of God.

== Journals ==
- Film-Philosophy
- Film and Philosophy
- Projections: The Journal for Movies and Mind

== See also ==
- Cinema 1: The Movement Image
- Linguistic film theory
