= Linguistic film theory =

Type of film theory concerning aesthetics of films

Linguistic film theory is a form of film theory that studies the aesthetics of films by investigating the concepts and practices that comprise the experience and interpretation of movies.

== Overview ==
Linguistic film theory was proposed by Stanley Cavell and it is based on the philosophical tradition begun by late Ludwig Wittgenstein. The theory itself is said to mirror aspects of the activity of Wittgenstein's own philosophising (e.g. Wittgenstein's thought experiments) as films are viewed capable of engaging the audience in a therapeutic process of 'dialogue' and even investigate the absurd and the limits of thought. Cavell's framework is seen as a distinctive way of approaching film and philosophy since question of style - the finding of words adequate to our aesthetic experience - is central to the understanding of the meaning of films. One of his ideas involved the position that "if one thinks of a grammar as a machine for generating sentences, then perhaps one will wish to speak of the camera and its film as a machine for generating idioms."

Critics from this tradition often clarify misconceptions used in theoretical film studies and instead produce analysis of a film's vocabulary and its link to a form of life.

== See also ==
- Film-Philosophy
- Historical poetics
- Neoformalism in film theory

== Bibliography ==
- Richard Allen, "Cognitive Film Theory," in Wittgenstein, Theory and the Arts, Routledge, 2001, ISBN 0-415-22875-1 ISBN 978-0415228756
- Stanley Cavell, The World Viewed: Reflections on the Ontology of Film (1971); 2nd enlarged edition. (1979) ISBN 0-674-96196-X ISBN 978-0674961968
- Stephen Mulhall, On Film, London/New York: Routledge, 2002. ISBN 0-415-24795-0 ISBN 9780415247955
- Rupert Read and Jerry Goodenough (eds.), Film as Philosophy: Essays on Cinema After Wittgenstein and Cavell, Palgrave Macmillan, 2005. ISBN 140394900X ISBN 978-1-4039-4900-4
