= Noël Carroll =

American philosopher (born 1947)

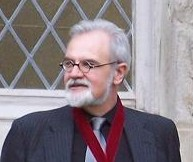
- Carroll in 2005
- Born: 1947 (age 78–79)
- Education: Hofstra University (BA); University of Pittsburgh (MA); New York University (MA, PhD); University of Illinois Chicago (MA, PhD)
- Occupations: Philosopher; journalist; author
- Spouse: Sally Banes (deceased)
- Partner: Joan Acocella (deceased)

Noel Carroll (born December 25, 1947, in Far Rockaway, New York City) is an American philosopher and a leading figure in the contemporary philosophy of art, Aesthetics, Philosophy of film, or Cinema studies. In 2016 in Leiter Reports: A Philosophy Blog, he was ranked sixth in a list of the Best Anglophone Philosophers of Art post-1945.

He also works in the philosophies of particular artforms, including literature, painting, theater, dance and, most notably, cinema and television where he is a prominent proponent of cognitive theories of the moving image. In addition, he has contributed to the theory of media, the philosophy of history, and the philosophy of the emotions. Carroll has worked as a journalist, and has written five documentaries. Since 2007, he has held the position of distinguished professor in the philosophy program at the CUNY Graduate Center.

== Education ==
Carroll graduated from Hofstra University in 1969 with a Bachelor of Arts, majoring in philosophy. He gained three Master of Arts degrees in philosophy, Cinema Studies, and Philosophy from the University of Pittsburgh, New York University, and the University of Illinois Chicago, respectively. During his tenure at New York University, he completed his PhD with the dissertation "An In-Depth Analysis of Buster Keaton's The General".

He completed another PhD from the University of Illinois Chicago in 1983.

== Career ==
Carroll holds two PhDs, one in cinema studies and the other in philosophy. From 1972 to 1988, he worked as a journalist covering film, theater, performance, and fine art for publications such as the Chicago Reader, Artforum, In These Times, Dance Magazine, SoHo Weekly News, and The Village Voice. Many of these early articles have been collected in his 2011 book Living in an Artworld. He has also written five documentaries.

Carroll has taught philosophy in a range of academic settings in the U.S. and abroad. Since 2007, he has been based at the Graduate Center of the City University of New York as distinguished professor. Earlier, he held named professorships at Temple University and the University of Wisconsin–Madison, and has also spent time teaching at institutions such as the University of Auckland, Cornell, Wesleyan, and Columbia.

== Philosophical works ==
One of Carroll's most well-known books is The Philosophy of Horror, or Paradoxes of the Heart (1990). It is an examination of the aesthetics of horror fiction (in novels, stories, radio and film).

In A Philosophy of Mass Art (1998), Carroll offered a defense of mass-produced art forms such as cinema, radio, and television. In On Criticism (2009), he presented a theory of art criticism and argued for its objectivity.

His 2022 work Classics in the Western Philosophy of Art examines key figures in the Western philosophical tradition, including Plato, Aristotle, Hutcheson, Hume, Kant, Schopenhauer, Tolstoy, and Clive Bell, offering commentary on their contributions to aesthetics.

Carroll has contributed to, while also sometimes initiating, discussions in the contemporary philosophy of art. These include the definition of art, moderate actual intentionalism, moderate moralism, the content-based approach to aesthetic experience, a purpose-driven model of art criticism, the characterization of aesthetic appreciation as a form of evaluative judgment, a definition of mass art, and arguments in support of the cognitive value of art.

His work addresses topics such as philosophizing through artworks, anti-autonomism, the nature of the avant-garde, the ethics of racist humor, the relationship between art and emotion and mood, narrative and fiction, medium-specificity in criticism, and the interplay between art and ideology.

=== Theory of the moving image ===
Carroll's best-known book in this area of inquiry is his criticism of Marxist/psychoanalytic film theory, Mystifying Movies: Fads and Fallacies in Contemporary Film Theory (1988). This book helped set the stage for the resurgence of the cognitive study of the moving image. Carroll co-edited a book with David Bordwell called Post-Theory: Reconstructing Film Studies (1996) which challenged grand unified theories of cinema, such as Marxist/psychoanalytic film theory, in favor of middle-level research.

In addition to his general contribution to the emergence of cognitivist approaches to the study of the moving image, Carroll has offered theories of suspense, point-of-view editing, the documentary, the image of women in film, the representation of race and ethnicity, film genres, the evaluation of motion pictures, and cinema style.

=== Books about Carroll ===
Two academic monographs have been published focusing on Carroll's philosophical work. Noel Carroll by Hae-Won Lee (Communication Books, 2017) offers an introduction to his theories of art, narrative, and media, and was published in Korean. Noel Carroll and Film: A Philosophy of Art and Popular Culture by Mario Slugan (Bloomsbury Academic, 2019) examines his influence on the philosophy of film and aesthetics, situating his work within broader debates in analytic philosophy and popular culture.

== Awards ==
- American Academy of Arts and Sciences Fellowship (2025)
- Guggenheim Fellowship (2002)
- Distinguished Professor of Philosophy, Graduate Center, City University of New York (2007–present)
- Danforth Fellowship (1969–1975)
- Filderman Award in Philosophy, Hofstra University (1967–1969)

== Selected publications ==
Carroll is the author of more than two hundred articles and other works:

=== Books ===
- Philosophical Problems of Classical Film Theory, Princeton, Princeton University Press, 1988.
- Mystifying Movies: Fads and Fallacies in Contemporary Film Theory, New York, Columbia University Press, 1988.
- The Philosophy of Horror, or Paradoxes of the Heart, New York, Routledge, 1990.
- Theorizing the Moving Image, Cambridge, Cambridge University Press, 1996.
- A Philosophy of Mass Art, New York, Oxford University Press, 1998.
- Interpreting the Moving Image, Cambridge, Cambridge University Press, 1998.
- Philosophy of Art: A Contemporary Introduction, New York, Routledge, 1999.
- Beyond Aesthetics: Philosophical Essays, Cambridge, Cambridge University Press, 2001.
- Engaging the Moving Image, New Haven, Yale University Press, 2003.
- Comedy Incarnate: Buster Keaton, Physical Humour and Bodily Coping, Malden, Blackwell Publishing, 2007.
- The Philosophy of Motion Pictures, Malden, Blackwell Publishing, 2008.
- On Criticism, London, Routledge, 2009.
- Art in Three Dimensions, Oxford, Oxford University Press, 2010.
- Living in an Artworld: Reviews and Essays on Dance, Performance, Theater, and the Fine Arts in the 1970s and 190s, Louisville, KY: Chicago Spectrum Press, 2012.
- Minerva's Night Out: Philosophy, Pop Culture, and Moving Pictures, Malden, Ma.: Blackwell Publishing, 2013.
- Humour: A Very Short Introduction, Oxford, Oxford University Press, 2014.
- Carroll on Theatre (Beijing, China: SDX Joint Publishing Company, 2019).
- Carroll, Noël; Di Summa, Laura T.; Loht, Shawn, eds. (2019). The Palgrave Handbook of the Philosophy of Film and Motion Pictures. doi:10.1007/978-3-030-19601-1. ISBN 978-3-030-19600-4.
- Movie-Made Philosophy: In Defense of the Possibility of Philosophizing through Films (Teheran, Iran: Niloofar Publisher, 2024).
- Philosophy and the Moving Image, Oxford, Oxford University Press, 2020.
- Arthur Danto's Philosophy of Art: Essays, Boston, Brill, 2021.
- Classics in Western Philosophy of Art, Indianapolis, Hackett Publishing Company, 2022.

==== Edited volumes ====
- Post-Theory: Reconstructing Film Studies (edited with David Bordwell), Madison, University of Wisconsin Press, 1996.
- Theories of Art Today, Madison, University of Wisconsin Press, 2000.
- Philosophy of Film and Motion Pictures (edited with Jinhee Choi), Malden, Blackwell Publishing, 2006.
- Philosophy in the Twilight Zone (edited with Lester Hunt), Oxford, Blackwell, 2009.
- The Poetics, Aesthetics and Philosophy of Narrative (edited with an introduction by Noël Carroll), Oxford, Blackwell, 2009.
- Narrative, Emotion, and Insight, with John Gibson. Penn State University Press, 20011.
- Routledge Companion to Philosophy of Literature, with John Gibson, Routledge, 2016.
- The Palgrave Handbook of the Philosophy of Film and Motion Pictures , with Laura T. Di Summa, Shawn Loht, Palgrave macmillan, 2019.
- The Routledge Companion to the Philosophies of Painting and Sculpture, with Jonathan Gilmore, Routledge, 2023.

=== Selected articles ===
- Carroll, Noel (1984). "Hume's Standard of Taste". The Journal of Aesthetics and Art Criticism. 43 (2): 181–194. doi:10.2307/429992. ISSN 0021-8529. JSTOR 429992.
- Carroll, Noël (2003), Lamarque, Peter; Olsen, Stein Haugom (eds.), "The Power of Movies", Aesthetics and the Philosophy of Art: The Analytic Tradition: An Anthology, Wiley-Blackwell, p. 21
- Carroll, N. (1996-07-01). "Moderate Moralism". The British Journal of Aesthetics. 36 (3): 223–238. doi:10.1093/bjaesthetics/36.3.223. ISSN 0007-0904.
- CARROLL, NOËL (1999-03-01). "Horror and Humor". The Journal of Aesthetics and Art Criticism. 57 (2): 145–160. doi:10.1111/1540_6245.jaac57.2.0145. ISSN 1540-6245.
- Carroll, Noel (2002). "The Wheel of Virtue: Art, Literature, and Moral Knowledge". Journal of Aesthetics and Art Criticism. 60 (1): 3–26. doi:10.1111/1540-6245.00048. ISSN 0021-8529.
- Carroll, Noël (2003). "Art and Mood". Monist. 86 (4): 521–555. doi:10.5840/monist200386426. ISSN 0026-9662.
- Carroll, Noël (2007-05-30). "Narrative closure". Philosophical Studies. 135 (1): 1–15. doi:10.1007/s11098-007-9097-9. ISSN 0031-8116.
- CARROLL, NOËL (2010-09-08). "Movies, the Moral Emotions, and Sympathy". Midwest Studies in Philosophy. 34 (1): 1–19. doi:10.1111/j.1475-4975.2010.00197.x. ISSN 0363-6550.
- Carroll, N. (2011-04-01). "Art Interpretation The 2010 Richard Wollheim Memorial Lecture". The British Journal of Aesthetics. 51 (2): 117–135. doi:10.1093/aesthj/ayr006. ISSN 0007-0904.
- Carroll, Noël (2016-12-01). "Art Appreciation". Journal of Aesthetic Education. 50 (4): 1–14. doi:10.5406/jaesteduc.50.4.0001. ISSN 0021-8510.
- Carroll, Noël (2019-11-23). "Some Stabs at the Ontology of Dance". Midwest Studies in Philosophy. 44 (1): 70–80. doi:10.1111/misp.12120. ISSN 0363-6550.
- Carroll, Noël (2020-10-21). "I'm Only Kidding: On Racist and Ethnic Jokes". The Southern Journal of Philosophy. 58 (4): 534–546. doi:10.1111/sjp.12391. ISSN 0038-4283.
- Carroll, Noël (2020). "Literature, the Emotions, and Learning". Philosophy and Literature. 44 (1): 1–18. doi:10.1353/phl.2020.0000.
- Carroll, Noël (2022-04-01). "Forget Taste". Journal of Aesthetic Education. 56 (1): 1–27. doi:10.5406/15437809.56.1.01. ISSN 0021-8510.
- Carroll, Noël (2023-08-16), "Moralism", The Oxford Handbook of Ethics and Art, Oxford University Press, pp. 302–319, doi:10.1093/oxfordhb/9780197539798.013.20, ISBN 978-0-19-753979-8
- Carroll, Noël (2023-12-01). "Two Approaches to Aesthetic Experience". Journal of Aesthetic Education. 57 (4): 1–17. doi:10.5406/15437809.57.4.01. ISSN 0021-8510.
- Carroll, Noel (2019). “Medium Specificity.” The Palgrave Handbook of the Philosophy of Film and Motion Pictures, Palgrave macmillan, 29-47

== See also ==
- American philosophy
- List of American philosophers

== Sources ==
- Mario Slugan, Noël Carroll and Film: A Philosophy of Art and Popular Culture. Bloomsbury, 2019.
