= Rudolf Arnheim =

German author and theorist (1904 – 2007)

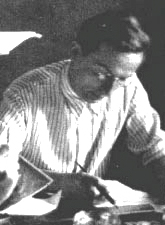
- Arnheim in the 1950s
- Born: July 15, 1904; Berlin, German Empire
- Died: June 9, 2007 (aged 102); Ann Arbor, Michigan, U.S.
- Education: University of Berlin
- Known for: Formalist film theory
- Scientific career
- Fields: Film theorist, psychologist
- Doctoral advisor: Max Wertheimer
- Other academic advisors: Wolfgang Köhler; Kurt Lewin

Rudolf Arnheim (German: [ˈaʁnhaɪ̯m]; July 15, 1904 – June 9, 2007) was a German-born writer, art and film theorist, and perceptual psychologist. He learned Gestalt psychology from studying under Max Wertheimer and Wolfgang Köhler at the University of Berlin and applied it to art.

His magnum opus was his book Art and Visual Perception: A Psychology of the Creative Eye (1954). Other major books by Arnheim have included Visual Thinking (1969), and The Power of the Center: A Study of Composition in the Visual Arts (1982). Art and Visual Perception was revised, enlarged and published as a new version in 1974, and it has been translated into fourteen languages. He lived in Germany, Italy, England, and the U.S., where he taught at Sarah Lawrence College, Harvard University, and the University of Michigan.

In Art and Visual Perception, he tried to use science to better understand art. In his later book Visual Thinking (1969), Arnheim critiqued the assumption that language goes before perception. For Arnheim, the only access to reality we have is through our senses. Arnheim argued that perception is strongly identified with thinking, and that artistic expression is another way of reasoning. In The Power of the Center, Arnheim addressed the interaction of art and architecture on concentric and grid spatial patterns. He argued that form and content are indivisible, and that the patterns created by artists reveal the nature of human experience.

== Early years ==
Rudolf Arnheim was born into a Jewish family in 1904 on Alexanderplatz, in Berlin. Not long after he was born, his family moved to Kaiserdamm in Charlottenburg, where they stayed until the early 1930s. He was interested in art from a young age, as he began drawing as a child. His father, Georg Arnheim, owned a small piano factory, and Georg Arnheim's plan for his son was for him to take over the factory. However, Rudolf wanted to continue his education, so his father agreed that he could spend half his week at the university and the other half at the factory. Rudolf ended up spending more time at the university, and when he was at the factory he was distracting the employees with his inquisitions about the mechanics of the piano, so his father agreed to let him focus entirely on his education. Rudolf was interested in psychology as long as he could remember, with his specific memory of buying some of the first editions of Sigmund Freud's books when he was fifteen or sixteen. These fueled his interest in psychoanalysis.

== Career ==
Arnheim attended the University of Berlin, where he wished to focus his studies on psychology. At that time, psychology was a branch of philosophy, so Arnheim ended up majoring in experimental psychology and philosophy, and minoring in art history and music. There were many prominent faculty members at the university at this time, among them were Albert Einstein, Max Planck, Max Wertheimer, and Wolfgang Köhler. Because Wertheimer and Köhler were in the psychology department, most of the psychology concerned Gestalt psychology. The Psychological Institute of Berlin University was located on two floors of the Imperial Palace, so Arnheim worked in makeshift laboratories decorated with paintings of angels and other artwork. This institute was more of a workshop because everyone was doing experiments and using each other rather than sitting in lectures. For Arnheim's dissertation, Max Wertheimer asked him to study human facial expressions and handwriting and how they corresponded. He looked at the extent to which people perceive an expression when they look at a face and what they perceive from a person's handwriting, as well as how the two corresponded. This was the beginning of Arnheim's study of expression, which he moved to looking at with visual arts. In 1928, he received his doctorate.

In the mid-1920s, Arnheim started to write film criticism for the Stachelschwein. Meanwhile, he sent his works to Siegfried Jacobsohn, the chief editor at Die Weltbühne, who accepted them. When Jacobsohn died in 1928, Ossietzky took over and then Arnheim worked on the cultural section until 1933. In the fall of 1932, Arnheim had an essay published in the Berliner Tageblatt, about three months before the Nazis came to power. The essay was about the nature of Charlie Chaplin's and Adolf Hitler's moustaches and what the moustache did to the nose in terms of human character. Considering the timing of this essay, and the fact that in 1933 the sale of his book Film as Art was no longer permitted due to the Nazis, some of Arnheim's friends advised him that he should leave the country and so, in August 1933, he moved to Rome. Arnheim lived and wrote about film and radio in Rome for the next six years. When World War II broke out, he moved to London, and he worked as a wartime translator for the British Broadcasting Corporation. He moved to the United States in 1940 and was shocked by all the lights of New York City. For him it was "the end of exile" since he had been used to living with constant black outs in London.

In 1943, he became a psychology professor at Sarah Lawrence College and a visiting lecturer at the New School for Social Research. Around this time he received two major awards. First, he received a Fellowship from the Rockefeller Foundation. With this he worked at Columbia University with their Office of Radio Research to analyze soap-operas and how they affected American audiences. He also received the Guggenheim Fellowship in 1942 in order to study perception in art. He ideally wanted to write about applying Gestalt theory to visual arts, but felt he did not have enough research. He postponed the book in order to do more studies on space, expression, and movement. In 1951, Arnheim was awarded another Rockefeller Foundation Fellowship so that he could take a leave from teaching and he wrote Art and Visual Perception: A Psychology of the Creative Eye.

Arnheim was invited to join Harvard University as professor of the psychology of art in 1968, and he stayed there for six years. The Carpenter Center for the Visual Arts at Harvard was an important building to him, as it was the only building designed in America by Le Corbusier and it was based on the modular theory. He retired in 1974 to Ann Arbor, Michigan with his wife Mary. He became a visiting professor at the University of Michigan and taught there for ten years. Arnheim was a part of the American Society for Aesthetics and was their president for two terms, and was also the president for the Division on Psychology and the Arts of the American Psychological Association for three terms. In 1976, he was elected a Fellow of the American Academy of Arts and Sciences. He died in Ann Arbor in 2007.

== Works ==
Although Art and Visual Perception: A Psychology of the Creative Eye took fifteen months to complete, he felt that he essentially wrote it in one long sitting. Revised in 1974, it has been translated into fourteen languages, and is one of the most influential art books of the century. In Art and Visual Perception, he attempts to use science to better understand art, still keeping in mind the important aspects of personal bias, intuition, and expression. Visual Thinking (1969) challenges the differences between thinking versus perceiving and intellect versus intuition. In it Arnheim critiques the assumption that language goes before perception and that words are the stepping stones of thinking. Sensory knowledge allows for the possibility of language, since the only access to reality we have is through our senses. Visual perception is what allows us to have a true understanding of experience. Arnheim also argues that perception is strongly identified with thinking, and that artistic expression is another way of reasoning. In The Power of the Center: A Study of Composition in the Visual Arts (1982), Arnheim addresses the interaction of art and architecture on concentric and grid spatial patterns. He argues that form and content are indivisible, and that the patterns created by artists reveal the nature of human experience.

== Theories ==
Arnheim believed that most people have their most productive ideas in their early twenties. They get hooked on an idea and spend the rest of their lives expanding on it. Arnheim's productive or generative idea was that the meaning of life and the world could be perceived in the patterns, shapes, and colors of the world. Therefore, he believed that we have to study those patterns and discover what they mean. He believed that artwork is visual thinking and a means of expression, not just putting shapes and colors together that look appealing. Art is a way to help people understand the world, and a way to see how the world changes through your mind. Its function is to show the essence of something, like our existence. Overall, he wrote fifteen books about perceptual psychology and art, architecture, and film.

== Publications ==
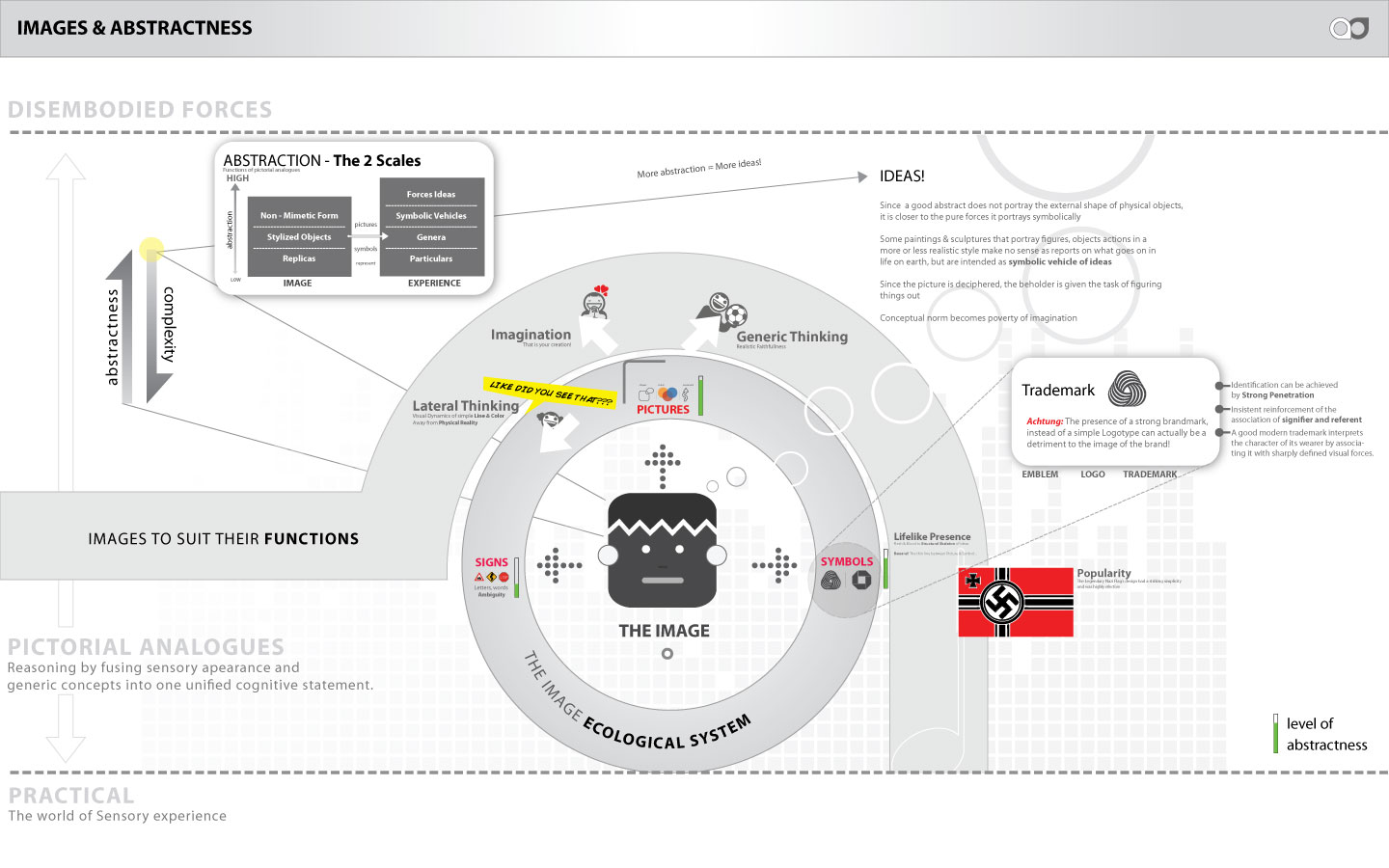
An abstract description of the Image and its functions as a Picture, Signs and Symbols from the book Visual Thinking by Rudolf Arnheim. This visualization represents the affordance in abstractness related to images.

- 1928: Experimentell-psychologische Untersuchungen zum Ausdrucksproblem. Psychologische Forschung, 11, 2–132.
- 1932: Film als Kunst. Berlin: Ernst Rowohlt. Neuausgaben: 1974, 1979, 2002. ISBN 978-0-520-24837-3.
- 1933/1936: Rundfunk als hörkunst/Radio as Sound
- 1943: Gestalt and art. Journal of Aesthetics and Art Criticism, 2, 71–5.
- 1949/1966: Toward a Psychology of Art. Berkeley and Los Angeles: University of California Press. ISBN 978-0-520-02161-7.
- 1954/1974: Art and Visual Perception: A Psychology of the Creative Eye. Berkeley and Los Angeles: University of California Press. ISBN 978-0-520-24383-5.
- 1957: Film as Art, Berkeley: University of California Press. ISBN 978-0-520-24837-3 [A revised and reduced version of Film als Kunst, 1932.]
- 1962/1974: Picasso's Guernica. Berkeley: University of California Press. ISBN 978-0-520-25007-9.
- 1969: Visual Thinking. Berkeley: University of California Press. ISBN 978-0-520-24226-5.
- 1971: Entropy and Art. Berkeley: University of California Press. ISBN 978-0-520-02617-9.
- 1972/1996: Anschauliches Denken. Zur Einheit von Bild und Begriff. Erstausgabe 1972, nun Köln: DuMont Taschenbuch 1996.
- 1977: The Dynamics of Architectural Form. Berkeley and Los Angeles: University of California Press. ISBN 978-0-520-03551-5.
- 1977: Kritiken und Aufsätze zum Film. (Hrsg.: Helmut H. Diederichs) München: Hanser.
- 1979: Radio als Hörkunst. München: Hanser. Neuausgabe: 2001 (Suhrkamp). ISBN 978-0-405-03570-8
- 1982/88: The Power of the Center: A Study of Composition in the Visual Arts. Berkeley: University of California Press. ISBN 978-0-520-06242-9.
- 1986: New Essays on the Psychology of Art. Berkeley: University of California Press. ISBN 978-0-520-05554-4.
- 1989: Parables of Sun Light: Observations on Psychology, the Arts, and the Rest. Berkeley: University of California Press. ISBN 978-0-520-06536-9.
- 1990: Thoughts on Art Education. Los Angeles: Getty Center for Education. ISBN 978-0-89236-163-2.
- 1992: To the Rescue of Art. Berkeley: University of California Press. ISBN 978-0-520-07459-0.
- 1996: The Split and the Structure. Berkeley: University of California Press. ISBN 978-0-520-20478-2.
- 1997: Film Essays and Criticism. University of Wisconsin Press. ISBN 978-0-299-15264-2.
- 2004: Die Seele in der Silberschicht. (Hrsg.: Helmut H. Diederichs) Frankfurt am Main: Suhrkamp.
- 2009: I baffi di Charlot. Scritti italiani sul cinema 1932-1938. (Ed.: Adriano D'Aloia) Turin: Kaplan. ISBN 978-88-89908-37-2.
- 2012: Cinema como Arte. As técnicas da linguagem audiovisual. (Transl.: Marco Bonetti) Niterói: Muiraquitan. ISBN 978-85-754312-45

== See also ==
- Spatial visualization ability
