= Marxist film theory =

Form of film theory concerning Marxism

Marxist film theory is an approach to film theory centered on concepts that make a political understanding of the medium possible. An individual studying a Marxist representation in a film, might take special interest in its representations of political hierarchy and social injustices.

== Overview ==
Sergei Eisenstein and many other Soviet filmmakers in the 1920s expressed ideas of Marxism through film. The Hegelian dialectic was considered best displayed in film editing through the Kuleshov Experiment and the development of montage.

Eisenstein's solution was to shun narrative structure by eliminating the individual protagonist and tell stories where the action is moved by the group and the story is told through a clash of one image against the next (whether in composition, motion, or idea) so that the audience is never lulled into believing that they are watching something that has not been worked over. Eisenstein himself was accused by the Soviet authorities under Joseph Stalin of "formalist error", of highlighting form as a thing of beauty instead of portraying the worker nobly.

French Marxist film makers, such as Jean-Luc Godard, employed radical editing and choice of subject matter as well as subversive parody to heighten class consciousness and promote Marxist ideas.

=== Screen theory ===
Screen theory is a Marxist–psychoanalytic film theory associated with the British journal Screen in the early 1970s. It considers filmic images as signifiers that do not only encode meanings but also mirrors in which viewers accede to subjectivity. The theory attempts to discover a way of theorizing a politics of freedom through cinema that focuses on diversity instead of unity. Here, the Marxist emphasis on universal consciousness as a basis for defining emancipation shifted to the articulation of diversities and multiplicities of individual and collective experience due to the psychoanalytic elaboration of the unconscious.

The theoreticians of the "Screen theory" approach—Colin MacCabe, Stephen Heath and Laura Mulvey—describe the "cinematic apparatus" as a version of Althusser's ideological state apparatus. According to Screen theory, it is the spectacle that creates the spectator and not the other way round. The fact that the subject is created and subjected at the same time by the narrative on screen is masked by the apparent realism of the communicated content. This is also explained by Screen's conceptualization of the post-structuralist theory, which regards a text as an act of intervention in the present so that the film is considered a work of production of meanings rather than reflection.

Screen theory's origins can be traced to the essays "Mirror Stage" by Jacques Lacan and Jacques-Alain Miller's Suture: Elements of the Logic of the Signifier. This theory describes an infant who has a fragmented experience of its body but once he looks in a mirror, he sees a whole being instead of fragmentary one.

== See also ==
- Karl Marx in film

== Bibliography ==
- Forsyth, Scott (1997). "Marxism, Film and Theory: From the Barricades to Postmodernism". Socialist Register. 33: 265–287. ISSN 0081-0606.
- Kornbluh, Anne (2019). Marxist Film Theory and Fight Club. Bloomsbury Academic. ISBN 9781501347320.
- James, David E. (1989). Allegories of Cinema. Princeton, N.J: Princeton Univ. Press. ISBN 978-0-691-04755-3.
