= David Bordwell =

American film scholar (1947–2024)

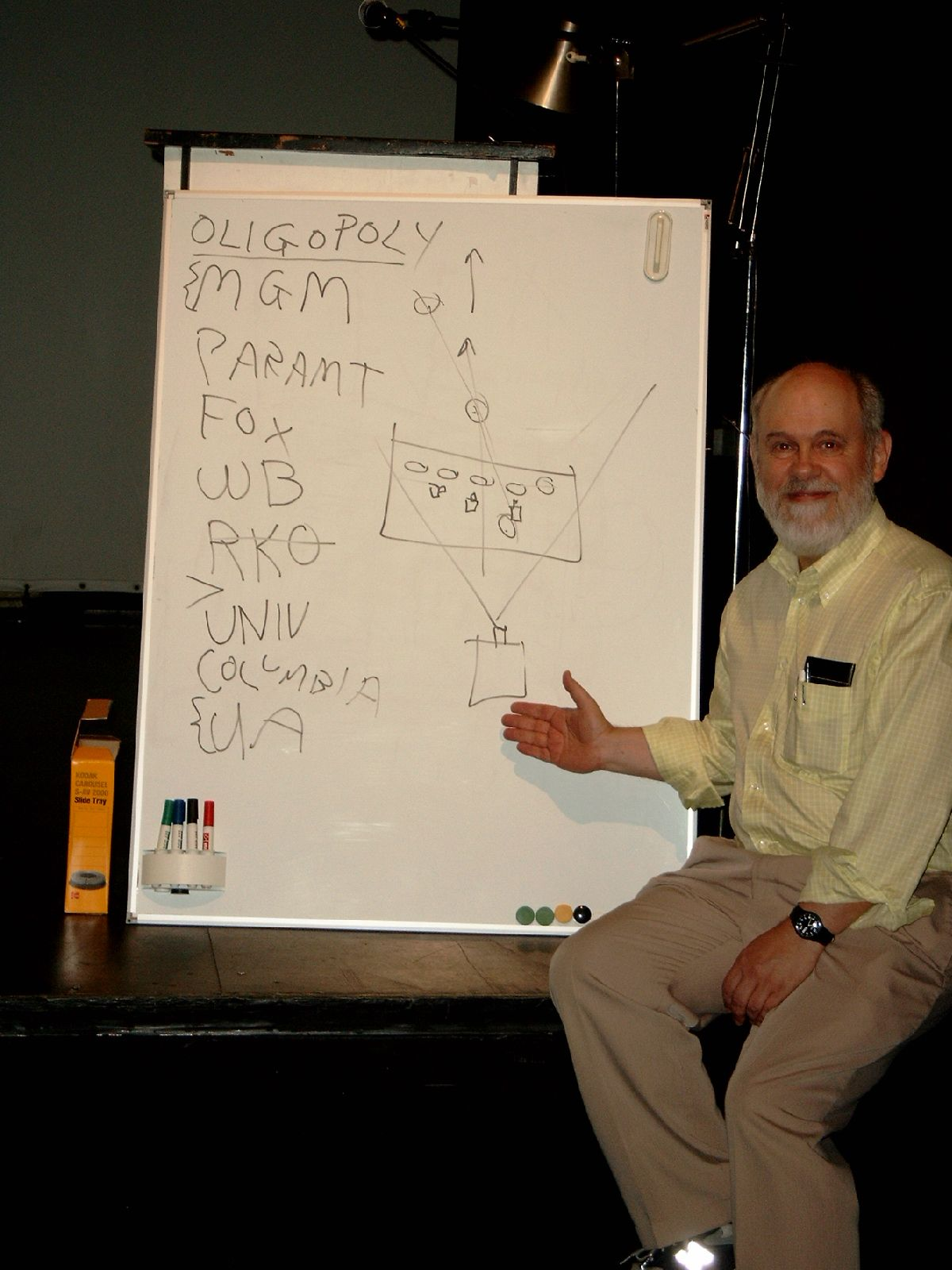
- Bordwell lecturing on the economics of the film industry; his whiteboard diagram shows the oligopoly that existed in the US film industry during the Golden Age of Hollywood.
- Born: July 23, 1947; Penn Yan, New York, U.S.
- Died: February 29, 2024 (aged 76); Madison, Wisconsin, U.S.
- Occupations: Film historian, film theorist
- Known for: Neoformalism, historical poetics, linguistic film theory
- Spouses: Barbara Weinstein (m. 1970, divorced); Kristin Thompson (m. 1979)
- Website: davidbordwell.net

David Jay Bordwell (/ˈbɔːrdwəl/; July 23, 1947 – February 29, 2024) was an American film theorist and film historian. After receiving his PhD from the University of Iowa in 1973, he wrote more than fifteen volumes on the subject of cinema including Narration in the Fiction Film (1985), Ozu and the Poetics of Cinema (1988), Making Meaning (1989), and On the History of Film Style (1997).

With his wife Kristin Thompson, Bordwell wrote the textbooks Film Art (1979) and Film History (1994). Film Art, in its 12th edition as of 2019, is still used as a text in introductory film courses. With aesthetics philosopher Noël Carroll, Bordwell edited the anthology Post-Theory: Reconstructing Film Studies (1996), a polemic on the state of contemporary film theory. His largest work was The Classical Hollywood Cinema: Film Style and Mode of Production to 1960 (1985), written in collaboration with Thompson and Janet Staiger. Several of his more influential articles on theory, narrative, and style were collected in Poetics of Cinema (2007), named in homage to the famous anthology of Russian formalist film theory Poetika Kino, edited by Boris Eikhenbaum in 1927.

Bordwell spent nearly the entirety of his career as a professor of film at the University of Wisconsin–Madison, retiring in 2004 and becoming the Ledoux Professor of Film Studies, Emeritus in the Department of Communication Arts. Film theorists who wrote their dissertations under his advisement include Edward Branigan, Murray Smith, and Carl Plantinga. He and Thompson maintained the blog "Observations on film art" for their ruminations on cinema.

== Early life ==
Bordwell was born in Penn Yan, New York, on July 23, 1947. He was educated at the State University of New York at Albany and the University of Iowa.

== Career ==
Drawing inspiration from film theorists such as Noel Burch as well as from art historian Ernst Gombrich, Bordwell contributed books and articles on classical film theory, the history of art cinema, classical and contemporary Hollywood cinema, and East Asian film style. However, his more influential and controversial works dealt with cognitive film theory (Narration in the Fiction Film being one of the first volumes on this subject), historical poetics of film style, and critiques of contemporary film theory and analysis (Making Meaning and Post-Theory were his two major contributions to this subject).

=== Neoformalism ===
Bordwell was also associated with a methodological approach known as neoformalism, although this approach has been more extensively written about by his wife, Kristin Thompson. Neoformalism is an approach to film analysis based on observations first made by the literary theorists known as the Russian formalists: that there is a distinction between a film's perceptual and semiotic properties (and that film theorists have generally overstated the role of textual codes in one's comprehension of such basic elements as diegesis and closure). One scholar has commented that the cognitivist perspective is the central reason why neoformalism earns its prefix (neo) and is not "traditional" formalism. Much of Bordwell's work considers the film-goer's cognitive processes that take place when perceiving the film's nontextual, aesthetic forms. This analysis includes how films guide our attention to salient narrative information, and how films partake in "defamiliarization", a formalist term for how art shows us familiar and formulaic objects and concepts in a manner that encourages us to experience them as if they were new entities.

Neoformalists reject many assumptions and methodologies made by other schools of film study, particularly hermeneutic (interpretive) approaches, among which he counts Lacanian psychoanalysis and certain variations of poststructuralism. In Post-Theory: Reconstructing Film Studies, Bordwell and co-editor Noël Carroll argue against these types of approaches, which they claim act as "Grand Theories" that use films to confirm predetermined theoretical frameworks, rather than attempting mid-level research meant to illuminate how films work. Bordwell and Carroll coined the term "S.L.A.B. theory" to refer to theories that use the ideas of Saussure, Lacan, Althusser, and/or Barthes.

=== Influence ===
Bordwell's considerable influence within film studies reached such a point that many of his concepts are reported to "have become part of a theoretical canon in film criticism and film academia."

== Archive ==
The David Bordwell Collection of over one hundred 35mm film prints is held at the Academy Film Archive and is particularly noteworthy for the strength of its Hong Kong holdings as well as having copies of Susan Seidelman's Desperately Seeking Susan and Peter Greenaway's Prospero's Books.

== Personal life and death ==
In 1970, Bordwell married Barbara Weinstein; their marriage ended in divorce. He married Kristin Thompson in 1979.

Bordwell died from idiopathic pulmonary fibrosis at his home in Madison, Wisconsin, on February 29, 2024, at the age of 76.

== Bibliography ==
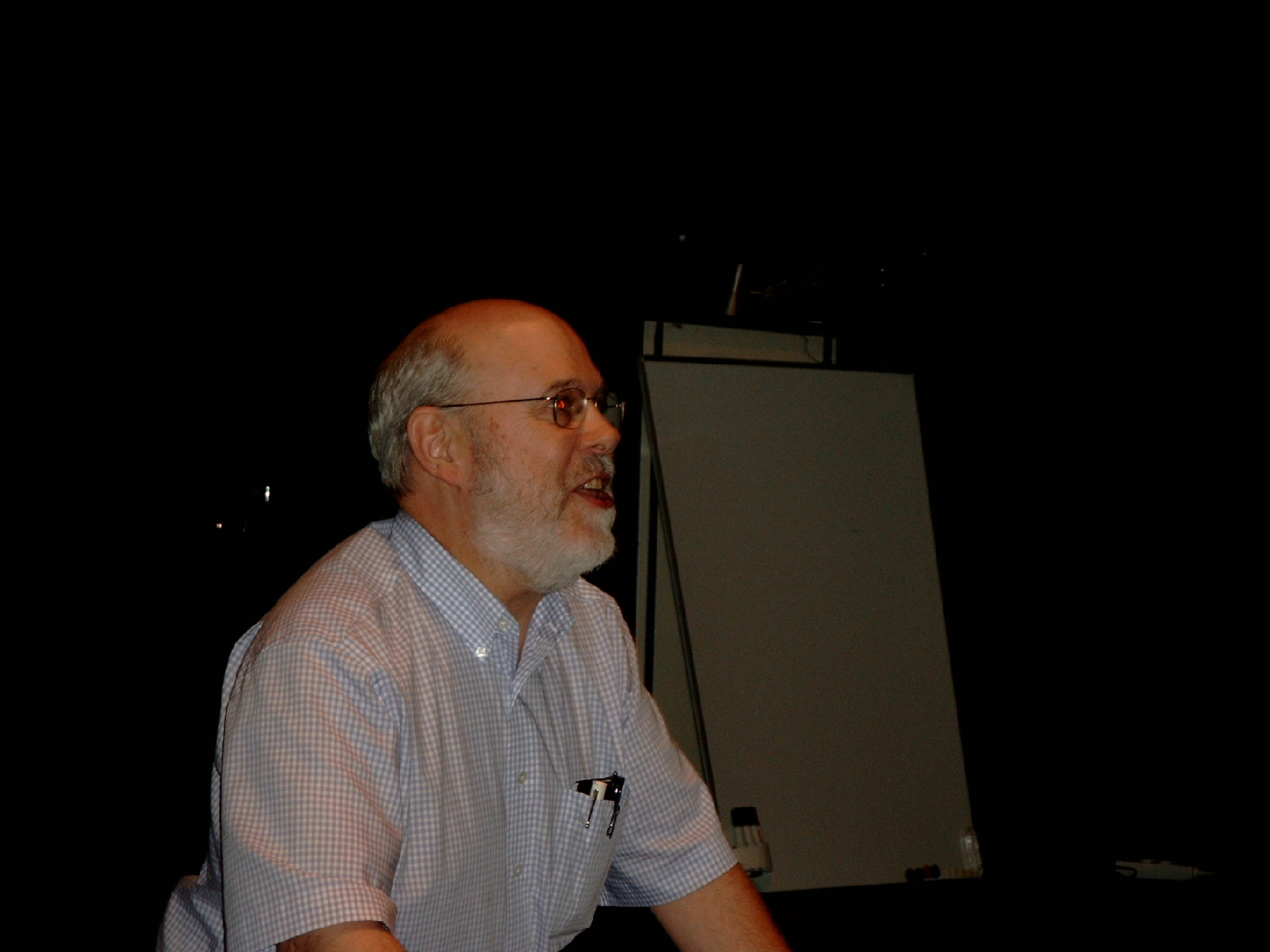
Bordwell delivering a lecture on film theory.

=== Books ===
- Bordwell, David (1973). Filmguide to La Passion de Jeanne d'Arc. Bloomington: Indiana University Press. ISBN 9780253393029.
- Bordwell, David; Thompson, Kristin (1979). Film Art: An Introduction. Reading, MA: Addison-Wesley. | Smith, Jeff (2024). 13th Edition. New York: McGraw-Hill. ISBN 9781264296095.
- Bordwell, David (1980). French Impressionist Cinema: Film Culture, Film Theory, Film Style. New York: Arno Press. Reprint of 1974 Ph.D. dissertation
- Bordwell, David (1981). The Films of Carl-Theodor Dreyer. Berkeley: University of California Press.
- Bordwell, David; Staiger, Janet; Thompson, Kristin (1985). The Classical Hollywood Cinema: Film Style and Mode of Production to 1960. New York: Columbia University Press.
- Bordwell, David (1985). Narration in the Fiction Film. Madison: University of Wisconsin Press.
- Bordwell, David (1988). Ozu and the Poetics of Cinema. Princeton: Princeton University Press.
- Bordwell, David (1989). Making Meaning: Inference and Rhetoric in the Interpretation of Cinema. Cambridge: Harvard University Press.
- Bordwell, David (1993). The Cinema of Eisenstein. Cambridge: Harvard University Press.
- Bordwell, David; Thompson, Kristin (1994). Film History: An Introduction. New York: McGraw-Hill. ISBN 9780070064454. | Smith, Jeff (2021). Fifth Edition. ISBN 9781260837476.
- Bordwell, David; Carroll, Noël, eds. (1996). Post-Theory: Reconstructing Film Studies. Madison: University of Wisconsin Press.
- Bordwell, David (1997). On the History of Film Style. Cambridge: Harvard University Press.
- Bordwell, David (2000). Planet Hong Kong: Popular Cinema and the Art of Entertainment. Cambridge: Harvard University Press.
- Bordwell, David (2005). Figures Traced in Light: On Cinematic Staging. Berkeley: University of California Press.
- Bordwell, David (2006). The Way Hollywood Tells It: Story and Style in Modern Movies. Berkeley: University of California Press.
- Bordwell, David (2008). Poetics of Cinema. Berkeley: Routledge.
- Bordwell, David; Thompson, Kristin (2011). Minding Movies: Observations on the Art, Craft, and Business of Filmmaking. Chicago: University of Chicago Press.
- Bordwell, David (2016). The Rhapsodes: How 1940s Critics Changed American Film Culture. Chicago: University of Chicago Press.
- Bordwell, David (2017). Reinventing Hollywood: How 1940s Filmmakers Changed Movie Storytelling. Chicago: University of Chicago Press.
- — (2023). Perplexing plots : popular storytelling and the poetics of murder. New York: Columbia University Press.

=== Select articles ===
- "The Art Cinema as a Mode of Film Practice" Film Criticism 4:1 (Fall 1979); revised for Poetics of Cinema
- "Textual Analysis, Etc." Enclitic 5:2 / 6:1 (Fall 1981 / Spring 1982); see also "Textual Analysis Revisited" Enclitic 7:1 (Spring 1983) written in response to Lawrence Crawford
- "Lowering the Stakes: Prospects for a Historical Poetics of Cinema" Iris 1:1 (1983)
- "Mizoguchi and the Evolution of Film Language" in Cinema and Language, eds. Stephen Heath and Patricia Mellencamp (AFI 1983)
- "Jump Cuts and Blind Spots" Wide Angle 6:1 (1984)
- "Widescreen Aesthetics and Mise-en-Scene Criticism" The Velvet Light Trap 21 (Summer 1985)
- "A Salt and Battery" (with Kristin Thompson) Film Quarterly, 40:2 (Winter 1986-87; from a polemic between Bordwell/Thompson and Barry Salt regarding The Classical Hollywood Cinema and Salt's own work on classical Hollywood style and technology
- "Approppriations and ImPropprieties: Problems in the Morphology of Film Narrative" Cinema Journal 27:3 (Spring 1988
- "Adventures in the Highlands of Theory" Screen 29:1 (Winter 1988); from a polemic between Bordwell/Staiger/Thompson and Barry King regarding King's two-part review of The Classical Hollywood Cinema
- "A Case for Cognitivism" Iris 9 (Spring 1989); see also "A Case for Cognitivism: Further Reflections" Iris 11 (Summer 1990) written in response to Dudley Andrew
- "A Cinema of Flourishes: Japanese Decorative Classicism of the Prewar Era" in Directions in Japanese Cinema, eds. David Desser and Arthur Noletti (Indiana 1992); reprinted in Poetics of Cinema
- "Cognition and Comprehension: Viewing and Forgetting in Mildred Pierce" Journal of Dramatic Theory and Criticism 6:2 (Spring 1992); revised for Poetics of Cinema
- "Film Interpretation Revisited" Film Criticism 17:2-3 (Winter/Spring 1993); written in response to critics of Making Meaning
- "The Power of a Research Tradition: Prospects for a Progress in the Study of Film Style" Film History 6:1 (Spring 1994)
- "Visual Style in Japanese Cinema, 1925-1945" Film History 7:1 (Spring 1995); revised for Poetics of Cinema
- "Contemporary Film Studies and the Vicissitudes of Grand Theory" in Post-Theory (UW-Madison 1996)
- "Convention, Construction, and Cinematic Vision" in Post-Theory (UW-Madison 1996); reprinted in Poetics of Cinema
- "La Nouvelle Mission de Feuillade; or, What Was Mise-en-Scene?" The Velvet Light Trap 37 (Spring 1996); revised for Figures Traced in Light
- "Aesthetics in Action: Kung Fu, Gunplay, and Cinematic Expressivity" in Fifty Years of Electric Shadows, ed. Law Kar (Urban Council / Hong Kong International Film Festival 1997); reprinted in Poetics of Cinema
- "Richness through Imperfection: King Hu and the Glimpse" in Transcending the Times: King Hu and Eileen Chan, ed. Law Kar (Urban Council / Hong Kong International Film Festival 1998); revised for Poetics of Cinema
- "Transcultural Spaces: Toward a Poetics of Chinese Film" Post Script 20:2 (2001)
- "Film Futures" Substance 97 (2002); reprinted in Poetics of Cinema
- "Intensified Continuity: Visual Style in Contemporary American Film" Film Quarterly 55:3 (Spring 2002); revised for The Way Hollywood Tells It
- "Who Blinked First? How Film Style Streamlines Nonverbal Interaction" Style and Story: Essays in Honor of Torben Grodal, eds. Lennard Hojbjerg and Peter Schepelern (Museum Tusulanum Press 2003); reprinted in Poetics of Cinema
- "CinemaScope: The Modern Miracle You See without Glasses!" in Poetics of Cinema; an expanded revision of "Schema and Revision: Staging and Composition in Early CinemaScope" in Le CinemaScope Entre art et industrie, ed. Jean-Jacques Meusy (AFRHC 2004)
- "Rudolf Arnheim: Clarity, Simplicity, Balance" in Arnheim for Film and Media Studies, ed. Scott Higgins (Routledge 2010); an expanded revision of Simplicity, clarity, balance: A tribute to Rudolf Arnheim from davidbordwell.net (June 15, 2007)

=== Select video essays ===
- "How Motion Pictures Become the Movies 1908-1920: Thirteen years that changed world cinema"
- "CinemaScope: The Modern Miracle You See without Glasses!"
- "Hou Hsiao-hsien: Constraints Traditions and Trends"

=== Select journal issues ===
- Iris 9 (Spring 1989) "Cinema and Cognitive Psychology"; issue edited by Dudley Andrew, featuring essays by Bordwell ("A Case for Cognitivism"), Julian Hochberg, Virginia Brooks, Dirk Eitzen, and Michel Colin; in Iris 11 Bordwell responds to Andrew's characterization of cognitive film theory ("A Case for Cognitivism: Further Reflections"), followed by Andrew's reply
- Journal of Dramatic Theory and Criticism 6:2 (Spring 1992) "Cognitive Science and Cinema"; supplement edited by Edward S. Small, featuring essays by Bordwell ("Cognition and Comprehension: Viewing and Forgetting in Mildred Pierce"), Joseph Anderson, and Calvin Pryluck, as well as Noël Carroll's response to Warren Buckland's review of Mystifying Movies: Fads and Fallacies in Contemporary Film Theory (from Screen 30:4), a response which the editors of Screen supposedly refused to print
- Film Criticism 17:2-3 (Winter/Spring 1993), "'Film Interpretation, Inc.': Issues in Contemporary Film Studies", issue dedicated to Making Meaning, featuring essays from Edward Branigan, RIck Altman, David A. Cook, Thomas Elsaesser, Robert B. Ray, and Robin Wood; Bordwell responds in length at the end ("Film Interpretation Revisited")
- Style 32:3 (Fall 1998), "Style in Cinema", issue edited by Bordwell, complementing On the History of Film Style and featuring essays by Noël Carroll, Lea Jacobs, Charles O'Brien, and Scott Higgins

=== Critical studies and reviews of Bordwell's work ===
Perplexing plots

- Betz, Phyllis M. (Spring 2024). "[Untitled review]". Clues : a journal of detection. 42 (1): 111–112.
