= Cognitivism (aesthetics) =

Aesthetic cognitivism is a methodology in the philosophy of art which relies on research in cognitive psychology, particularly using audience responses to art. Although the term is used more in the humanities, the methodology is inherently interdisciplinary due to its reliance on both humanistic and scientific research.

== Overview ==
Cognitivism is a departure from methodologies that have dominated studies of art in the past, particularly in literary theory and film theory, which have not employed scientific research. In some cases, particularly since the rise in the 1970s of psychoanalytic, ideological, semiotic, and Marxist approaches to theory in humanities research in Western academia, cognitivism has been explicitly rejected due to its reliance on science, which some scholars in those schools believe offers false claims to truth and objectivity.

Within aesthetic research, cognitivism has been most successful in literary and film studies (in the forms of cognitive literary theory (as proposed by Mary Thomas Crane and Alan Richardson) and cognitive film theory (as proposed by Noël Carroll) respectively, where it generally aims to explain audience comprehension, emotional elicitation, and aesthetic preference. Although some cognitivists, such as Torben Grodal, also employ ideas from evolutionary psychology in their work, there is no necessary connection between these approaches, and many cognitivists do not agree with conclusions made by evolutionary psychologists.

Cognitivism is considered to have been introduced to film studies by David Bordwell's 1985 book Narration in the Fiction Film. Cognitive film studies is now prominent enough in film studies to be included in textbooks that survey film theory.

Cognitivism is considered a naturalistic discipline in that it discusses concepts it believes are ultimately grounded in observable evidence.

Prominent cognitivists include Murray Smith, Carl Plantinga, Patrick Colm Hogan, and Joseph Anderson.

== See also ==
- Cognitive neuroscience of music
- Cognitive semiotics
- Darwinian literary studies
- Neuroesthetics
