= Structuralist film theory =

Branch of film theory rooted in structuralism

Structuralist film theory is a branch of film theory that is rooted in structuralism, itself based on structural linguistics.

== Overview ==
Structuralist film theory emphasizes how films convey meaning through the use of codes and conventions not dissimilar to the way languages are used to construct meaning in communication. However, structuralist film theory differs from linguistic theory in that its codifications include a more apparent temporal aspect. In other words, the site of the study (the film) is moving in time and must be analyzed in a framework which can consider its temporality. To that end, structuralist film theory is dependent on a new kind of sign, first proposed by the Prague linguistic circle, dubbed the ostensive sign.

== Theoreticians ==
Film theorists associated with structuralism include Peter Wollen, Sol Worth, Calvin Pryluck, Christian Metz. and Will Wright.

== See also ==
- Semiotic literary criticism
- Structural film
