= Screen (journal) =

- Discipline: Film and television studies
- Language: English

Publication details
- History: 1952–present
- Publisher: Oxford University Press

Standard abbreviations
- ISO 4: Screen

Indexing
- ISSN: 0036-9543 (print); 1460-2474 (web)
- LCCN: 91642840
- OCLC no.: 59715510

Links
- Journal homepage; Online access; Journal page at publisher's website

Screen is an academic journal of film and television studies based at the University of Glasgow and published by Oxford University Press.

== History ==
Screen originated in the Society of Film Teachers' newsletter, The Film Teacher, seventeen issues of which appeared between 1952 and 1958. In the following year the Society, renamed the Society for Education in Film and Television (SEFT), launched a print journal called Screen Education, which was renamed Screen in 1969. Screen Education continued publication as a sister journal to Screen until 1982. In 1989 SEFT ceased operation and Screen moved to its current base at the University of Glasgow.

During the 1970s, Screen was particularly influential in the nascent field of film studies. It published many articles that have become standards in the field—including Laura Mulvey's foundational work, "Visual Pleasure and Narrative Cinema" (1975). Now published by Oxford University Press, the journal is still highly regarded in academic circles.

Screen theory, a Marxist-psychoanalytic film theory that came to prominence in Britain in the early 1970s, took its name from Screen.

== Abstracting and indexing ==
The journal is abstracted and indexed in:

- Arts and Humanities Citation Index
- British Humanities Index
- Current Contents/Arts & Humanities
- FIAF International Index to Film Periodicals Plus
- MLA International Bibliography
- International Index to the Performing Arts
- Studies on Women and Gender Abstracts

== See also ==
- List of film periodicals
