= Psychoanalytic film theory =

School of academic thought

Psychoanalytic film theory is a school of academic thought that evokes the concepts of psychoanalysts Sigmund Freud and Jacques Lacan. The theory is closely tied to Critical theory, Marxist film theory, and Apparatus theory. The theory is separated into two waves. The first wave occurred in the 1960s and 70s. The second wave became popular in the 1980s and 90s.

== Precursors ==
At the end of the nineteenth century, psychoanalysis was created, and film happened to follow shortly afterward. André Breton, the founder of the Surrealist movement, saw film as a means of engaging the unconscious. Since films had the ability to tell a story using techniques such as superimposition, and slow motion, the Surrealists saw this as mimicking dreams.

Early applications of psychoanalysis to cinema concentrated on unmasking latent meanings behind screen images, before moving on to a consideration of film as a representation of fantasy. From there, a wider consideration of the subject position of the viewer led to wider engagements with critical theory - to psychoanalytic film theory proper.

From 1969, as a reaction to the unrest in Paris in May 68, a theoretical examination of the medium of cinema developed, starting in France, more precisely on the part of French film criticism, the basis of which was a mixture of psychoanalysis, semiotics, structuralism and Marxism . The formation of psychoanalytic film theories reached its peak in 1975: the articles "Le Dispositif: approches métapsychologiques de l'impression de réalité" by Jean Louis Baudry and "Le film de fiction et son spectateur (Étude métapsychologique)" by Christian Metz advanced to the most influential and effective texts.

The focus of this theoretical film debate was the viewer subject and its relationship to cinema. The starting point was formed by the considerations of the French theorist Jean Louis Baudry and the writings on film theory by Christian Metz, whose Le signifiant imaginaire. Psychoanalyse et cinéma (1977, dt.: The imaginary signifier. Psychoanalyse and cinema) really opened the discussion. Metz makes an attempt to transfer psychoanalytic terms - in particular the theory of Jacques Lacan - to the field of cinematography.

Psychoanalytic film theory primarily tries to work out how the unconscious supports the reception of film events, or how film and cinema trigger unconscious, irrational processes in the viewer and thus turn film watching into a pleasurable experience. If film, as has always been claimed, can be brought close to the dream, then it must be possible to approach it with the means of psychoanalysis (analogous to the interpretation of a dream).

Freud's concepts of the Oedipus complex, narcissism, castration, the unconscious, the return, and hysteria are all utilized in film theory. The 'unconscious' of a film are examined; this is known as subtext.

== Gaze ==
In the early 1970s, Christian Metz and Laura Mulvey separately explored aspects of the "gaze" in the cinema, Metz stressing the viewer's identification with the camera's vision, - an identification largely "constructed" by the film itself - and Mulvey the fetishistic aspects of (especially) the male viewer's regard for the onscreen female body.

The viewing subject may be offered particular identifications (usually with a leading male character) from which to watch. The theory stresses the subject's longing for a completeness which the film may appear to offer through identification with an image, although Lacanian theory also indicates that identification with the image is never anything but an illusion and the subject is always split simply by virtue of coming into existence (aphanisis).

== Second wave ==
A second wave of psychoanalytic film criticism associated with Jacqueline Rose emphasised the search for the missing object of desire on the part of the spectator: in Elizabeth Cowie's words, "the pleasure of fantasy lies in the setting out, not in the having of the objects".

From 1990 onward the Matrixial theory of artist and psychoanalyst Bracha L. Ettinger revolutionized feminist film theory. Her concept The Matrixial Gaze, that has established a feminine gaze and has articulated its differences from the phallic gaze and its relation to feminine as well as maternal specificities and potentialities of "coemergence", offering a critique of Sigmund Freud's and Jacques Lacan's psychoanalysis, is extensively used in analysis of films, by female authors, like Chantal Akerman, as well as by male authors, like Pedro Almodovar. The matrixial gaze offers the female the position of a subject, not of an object, of the gaze, while deconstructing the structure of the subject itself, and offers border-time, border-space and a possibility for compassion and witnessing. Ettinger's notions articulate the links between aesthetics, ethics and trauma.

As post-structuralism took an increasingly pragmatic approach to the possibilities Theory offered, so too Joan Copjec criticised early work around the gaze in the light of the work of Michel Foucault. The role of trauma in cinematic representation came more to the fore, and Lacanian analysis was seen to offer fertile ways of speaking of film rather than definitive answers or conclusive self-knowledge.

== See also ==
- Feminist film theory
- Scopophilia
- Screen
- Voyeurism
- Slavoj Žižek
- The Pervert's Guide to Cinema
- Psychology of film
