= Film theory =

Conceptual frameworks for understanding the nature of cinema

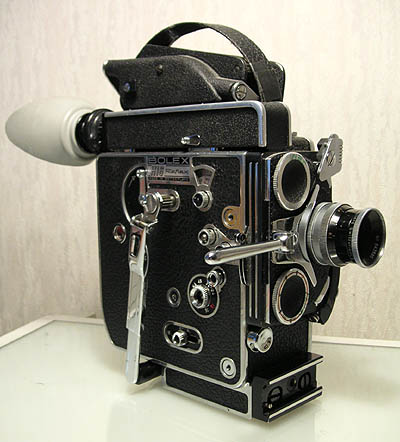
This 16 mm spring-wound Bolex "H16" Reflex camera is a popular entry level camera used in film schools.

Film theory is a set of scholarly approaches within the academic discipline of film or cinema studies that began in the 1920s by questioning the formal essential attributes of motion pictures; and that now provides conceptual frameworks for understanding film's relationship to reality, the other arts, individual viewers, and society at large. Film theory is not to be confused with general film criticism, or film history, though these three disciplines interrelate. Although some branches of film theory are derived from linguistics and literary theory, it also originated and overlaps with the philosophy of film.

== History ==
=== Early theory, before 1945 ===
French philosopher Henri Bergson's Matter and Memory (1896) anticipated the development of film theory during the birth of cinema in the early twentieth century. Bergson commented on the need for new ways of thinking about movement, and coined the terms "the movement-image" and "the time-image". However, in his 1906 essay L'illusion cinématographique (in L'évolution créatrice; English: The cinematic illusion) he rejects film as an example of what he had in mind. Nonetheless, decades later, in Cinéma I and Cinema II (1983–1985), the philosopher Gilles Deleuze took Matter and Memory as the basis of his philosophy of film and revisited Bergson's concepts, combining them with the semiotics of Charles Sanders Peirce. Early film theory arose in the silent era and was mostly concerned with defining the crucial elements of the medium. Ricciotto Canudo was an early Italian film theoretician who saw cinema as "plastic art in motion", and gave cinema the label "the Sixth Art", later changed to "the Seventh Art".

In 1915, Vachel Lindsay wrote a book on film, followed a year later by Hugo Münsterberg. Lindsay argued that films could be classified into three categories: action films, intimate films, as well as films of splendour. According to him, the action film was sculpture-in-motion, while the intimate film was painting-in-motion, and splendour film architecture-in-motion. He also argued against the contemporary notion of calling films photoplays and seen as filmed versions of theatre, instead seeing film with camera-born opportunities. He also described cinema as hieroglyphic in the sense of containing symbols in its images. He believed this visuality gave film the potential for universal accessibility. Münsterberg in turn noted the analogies between cinematic techniques and certain mental processes. For example, he compared the close-up to the mind paying attention. The flashback, in turn, was similar to remembering. This was later followed by the formalism of Rudolf Arnheim, who studied how techniques influenced film as art.

Among early French theorists, Germaine Dulac brought the concept of impressionism to film by describing cinema that explored the malleability of the border between internal experience and external reality, for example through superimposition. Surrealism also had an influence on early French film culture. The term photogénie was important to both, having been brought to use by Louis Delluc in 1919 and becoming widespread in its usage to capture the unique power of cinema. Jean Epstein noted how filming gives a "personality" or a "spirit" to objects while also being able to reveal "the untrue, the unreal, the 'surreal'". This was similar to defamiliarization used by avant-garde artists to recreate the world. He saw the close-up as the essence of photogénie. Béla Balázs also praised the close-up for similar reasons. Arnheim also believed defamiliarization to be a critical element of film.

After the Russian Revolution, a chaotic situation in the country also created a sense of excitement at new possibilities. This gave rise to montage theory in the work of Dziga Vertov and Sergei Eisenstein. After the establishment of the Moscow Film School, Lev Kuleshov set up a workshop to study the formal structure of film, focusing on editing as "the essence of cinematography". This produced findings on the Kuleshov effect. Editing was also associated with the foundational Marxist concept of dialectical materialism. To this end, Eisenstein claimed that "montage is conflict". Eisenstein's theories were focused on montage having the ability create meaning transcending the sum of its parts with a thematic effect in a way that ideograms turned graphics into abstract symbols. Multiple scenes could work to produce themes (tonal montage), while multiple themes could create even higher levels of meaning (intellectual montage). Vertov in turn focused on developing Kino-Pravda, film truth, and the Kino-Eye, which he claimed showed a deeper truth than could be seen with the naked eye.

=== Later theory, after 1945 ===
In the years after World War II, the French film critic and theorist André Bazin argued that film's essence lay in its ability to mechanically reproduce reality, not in its difference from reality. This had followed the rise of poetic realism in French cinema in the 1930s. He believed that the purpose of art is to preserve reality, even famously claiming that "The photographic image is the object itself". Based on this, he advocated for the use of long takes and deep focus, to reveal the structural depth of reality and finding meaning objectively in images. This was soon followed by the rise of Italian neorealism. Siegfried Kracauer was also notable for arguing that realism is the most important function of cinema.

The Auteur theory derived from the approach of critic and filmmaker Alexandre Astruc, among others, and was originally developed in articles in Cahiers du Cinéma, a film journal that had been co-founded by Bazin. François Truffaut issued auteurism's manifestos in two Cahiers essays: "Une certaine tendance du cinéma français" (January 1954) and "Ali Baba et la 'Politique des auteurs'" (February 1955). His approach was brought to American criticism by Andrew Sarris in 1962. The auteur theory was based on films depicting the directors' own worldviews and impressions of the subject matter, by varying lighting, camerawork, staging, editing, and so on. Georges Sadoul deemed a film's putative "author" potentially even an actor, but a film indeed collaborative. Aljean Harmetz cited major control even by film executives. David Kipen's view of screenwriter as indeed main author is termed Schreiber theory.

In the 1960s and 1970s, film theory took up residence in academia importing concepts from established disciplines like psychoanalysis, gender studies, anthropology, literary theory, semiotics and linguistics—as advanced by scholars such as Christian Metz. However, not until the late 1980s or early 1990s did film theory per se achieve much prominence in American universities by displacing the prevailing humanistic, auteur theory that had dominated cinema studies and which had been focused on the practical elements of film writing, production, editing and criticism. American scholar David Bordwell has spoken against many prominent developments in film theory since the 1970s. He uses the derogatory term "SLAB theory" to refer to film studies based on the ideas of Ferdinand de Saussure, Jacques Lacan, Louis Althusser, and Roland Barthes. Instead, Bordwell promotes what he describes as "neoformalism" (a revival of formalist film theory).

During the 1990s the digital revolution in image technologies has influenced film theory in various ways. There has been a refocus onto celluloid film's ability to capture an "indexical" image of a moment in time by theorists like Mary Ann Doane, Philip Rosen and Laura Mulvey who was informed by psychoanalysis. From a psychoanalytical perspective, after the Lacanian notion of "the Real", Slavoj Žižek offered new aspects of "the gaze" extensively used in contemporary film analysis. From the 1990s onward the Matrixial theory of artist and psychoanalyst Bracha L. Ettinger revolutionized feminist film theory. Her concept The Matrixial Gaze, that has established a feminine gaze and has articulated its differences from the phallic gaze and its relation to feminine as well as maternal specificities and potentialities of "coemergence", offering a critique of Sigmund Freud's and Jacques Lacan's psychoanalysis, is extensively used in analysis of films by female authors, like Chantal Akerman, as well as by male authors, like Pedro Almodovar. The matrixial gaze offers the female the position of a subject, not of an object, of the gaze, while deconstructing the structure of the subject itself, and offers border-time, border-space and a possibility for compassion and witnessing. Ettinger's notions articulate the links between aesthetics, ethics and trauma. There has also been a historical revisiting of early cinema screenings, practices and spectatorship modes by writers Tom Gunning, Miriam Hansen and Yuri Tsivian.

In Critical Cinema: Beyond the Theory of Practice (2011), Clive Meyer suggests that 'cinema is a different experience to watching a film at home or in an art gallery', and argues for film theorists to re-engage the specificity of philosophical concepts for cinema as a medium distinct from others.

== Specific theories of film ==
- Apparatus theory
- Auteur theory
- Cognitive film theory
- Feminist film theory
- Genre studies
- Linguistic film theory
- Marxist film theory
- Psychoanalytic film theory
- Queer theory
- Schreiber theory
- Screen theory
- Structuralist film theory

== See also ==
- Cinematography
- Digital cinema
- 3D film
- Film
- Film studies
- Glossary of motion picture terms
- Invisible auditor
- List of film periodicals
- Narrative film
- Philosophy of film
- Psychology of film
