= Bracha L. Ettinger =

Israeli-French artist, painter, philosopher, theorist, and psychoanalyst

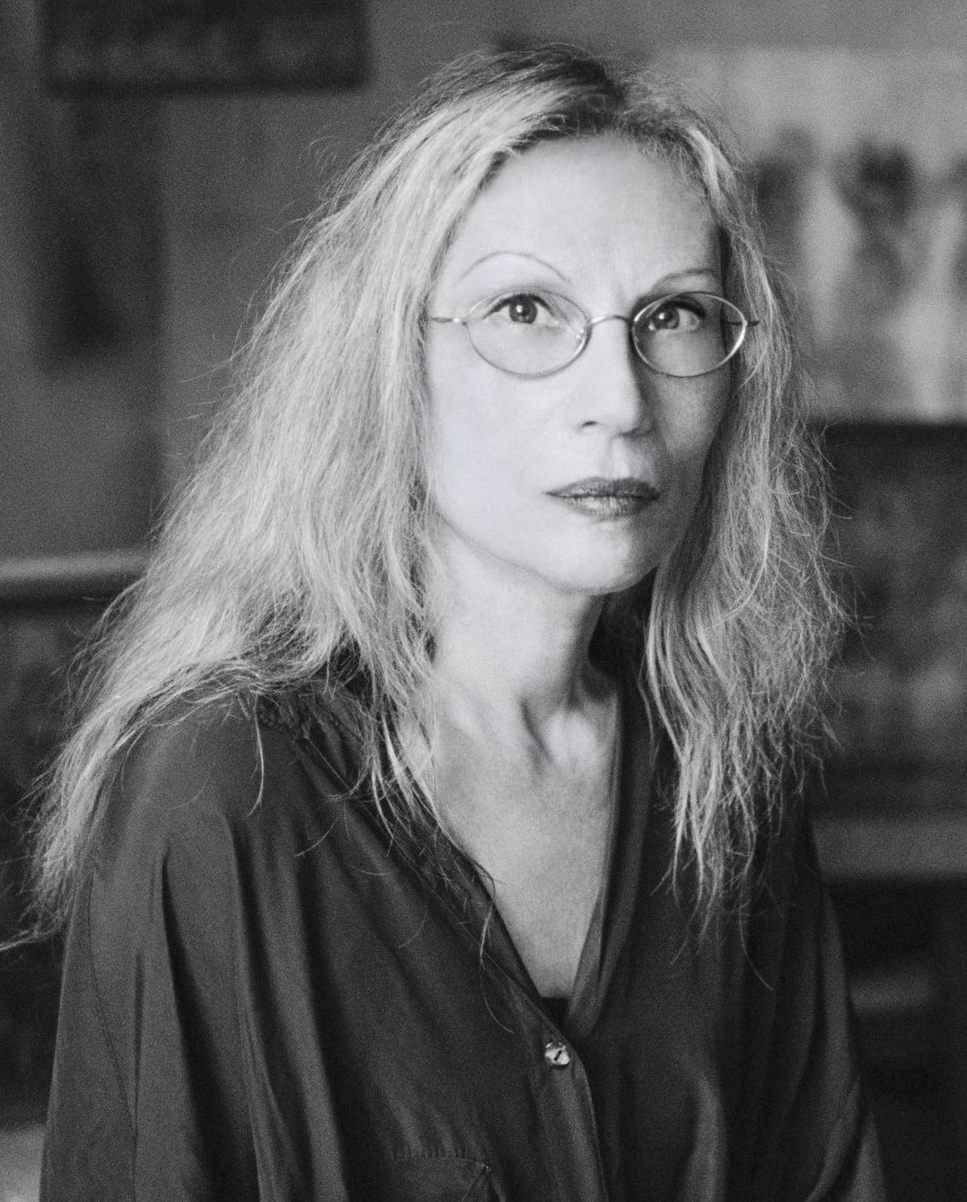
- Born: Bracha Lichtenberg Ettinger; 23 March 1948 (age 78); Tel Aviv, Mandatory Palestine (present-day Israel)

Education
- Education: Hebrew University of Jerusalem

Philosophical work
- Era: Contemporary philosophy
- Region: Western philosophy
- School: Continental philosophy Psychoanalysis
- Main interests: Lacanian psychoanalysis, art, feminist theory, aesthetics, human rights, ethics
- Notable ideas: Matrixial gaze, matrixial space, transjectivity, transubjectivity, copoiesis, wit(h)nessing, carriance, fascinance, seduction-into-life, being-toward-birthing, coemergence, matrixial trans-subjectivity, the Subreal

Bracha Lichtenberg Ettinger (Hebrew: ברכה ליכטנברג אטינגר; born 23 March 1948) is an Israeli-French artist, writer, psychoanalyst and philosopher based in France. Born in Mandatory Palestine, she lives and works in Paris. She is a feminist theorist and artist in contemporary New European Painting who invented the concepts of the matrixial space and matrixial gaze and related concepts around trauma, aesthetics and ethics. Ettinger is a professor at European Graduate School in Saas-Fee, Switzerland and at GCAS, Dublin. In 2023, she was part of the Finding Committee for the artistic director of Documenta's 2027 edition. She resigned from that role with a public letter intended to open a radical discussion in the artworld, following the administration's rejection of her request for a pause due to the attacks on civilians in Israel and in Gaza and the ongoing heavy losses of life.

== Life and work ==
Bracha Lichtenberg was born to Jewish-Polish Holocaust survivors in Tel Aviv on 23 March 1948. She received her M.A. in Clinical Psychology from the Hebrew University of Jerusalem where she worked as research assistant for, then as personal assistant of, Amos Tversky (1969/70, 1973/74, 1974/75) and Danny Kahneman (1970/71). She moved to London for 4 years where she studied, trained, and worked between 1975 and 1979 at the London Centre for Psychotherapy (with Elsa Seglow), the Tavistock Clinic, and the Philadelphia Association (with R. D. Laing) and became a British citizen. She married Loni Ettinger in 1975 and divorced him in 1981; her daughter, the actress Lana Ettinger, was born in London.

Ettinger returned to Israel in 1979 and worked at Shalvata Hospital. She has painted and drawn since early childhood, self-taught. In her early days she avoided the art scene. In 1981, she divorced her first husband, decided to become a professional artist and moved to Paris where she lived and worked from 1981 onward. Her son, Itai Toker, was born in 1988. She works between Paris and Tel Aviv since 2003. As well as painting, drawing, artist-books (notebooks) and photography, she began writing her theory of the matrixial space in ethics, aesthetics and psychoanalysis, and received a D.E.A. in Psychoanalysis from the University Paris VII Diderot in 1987, and a Ph.D. in Aesthetics of Art from the University of Paris VIII in 1996.

Ettinger had a solo project at the Pompidou Centre in 1987, and a solo exhibition at the Museum of Calais in 1988. In 1995, she had a solo exhibition at the Israel Museum in Jerusalem, and in 1996 she participated in the Contemporary art section of Face à l'Histoire. 1933–1996 exhibition in the Pompidou Centre. In 2000, she had a mid-life retrospective at the Centre for Fine Arts (The Palais des Beaux Arts) in Brussels, and in 2001 a solo exhibition at the Drawing Center in New York. She continued to train as a psychoanalyst with Françoise Dolto, Piera Auglanier, Pierre Fedida, and Jacques-Alain Miller, and became an influential contemporary French feminist. Her recent solo shows include Centre Pompidou, Paris, 2024 and Castello di Rivoli, Turin, 2022. Ettinger had solo exhibitions in major museums like the Tapies Foundation in Barcelona, Moma in Oxford, The Russian Museum in Saint Petersburg, the Museum of Angers and more.

Around 1988, Ettinger began her Conversation and Photography project. In 1981 she began her singular poetic art notebooks project which have become source for her theoretical writing. Her art has inspired historian Griselda Pollock, international curator Catherine de Zegher, and philosophers Jean-François Lyotard, Christine Buci-Glucksmann and Brian Massumi, who dedicated a number of essays to her painting.

Based mainly in Paris, Ettinger was visiting professor (1997–1998) and then research professor (1999–2004) in psychoanalysis and aesthetics at the School of Fine Art, History of Art and Cultural Studies at the University of Leeds. Since 2001, she has been visiting professor in Psychoanalysis and Aesthetics at the AHRC Centre for Cultural Analysis, Theory and History (now CentreCATH). She was a lecturer at the Bezalel Academy of Art and Design in Jerusalem between 2023 and 2006, when she became chair and Professor at the EGS. She founded the matrixial theory in psychoanalysis.

== Artistic career ==
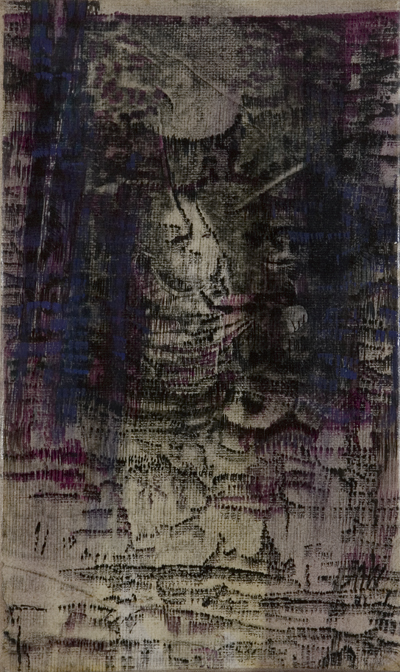
Bracha Ettinger, Painting: Matrix — Family Album series n.3, 2001

Ettinger's art engages in the subjects of trauma, mothers and women during the Shoah and during wars, as well as the feminine in mythology: Eurydice, Medusa, Demeter, Persephone, and matrixial Eros. Her abstract research in painting concerns light and space, which follows Monet and Rothko. Her subjects concern the human condition and the tragedy of war, and her work in this aspect joins artists such as Käthe Kollwitz and Francisco Goya. The painting process engages a space of passage between figures and abstraction, and her attitude to abstraction resonates with the spiritual concerns of Agnes Martin, Emma Kunz and Hilma af Klint. Her notebooks accompany the painting process but are equally artworks.

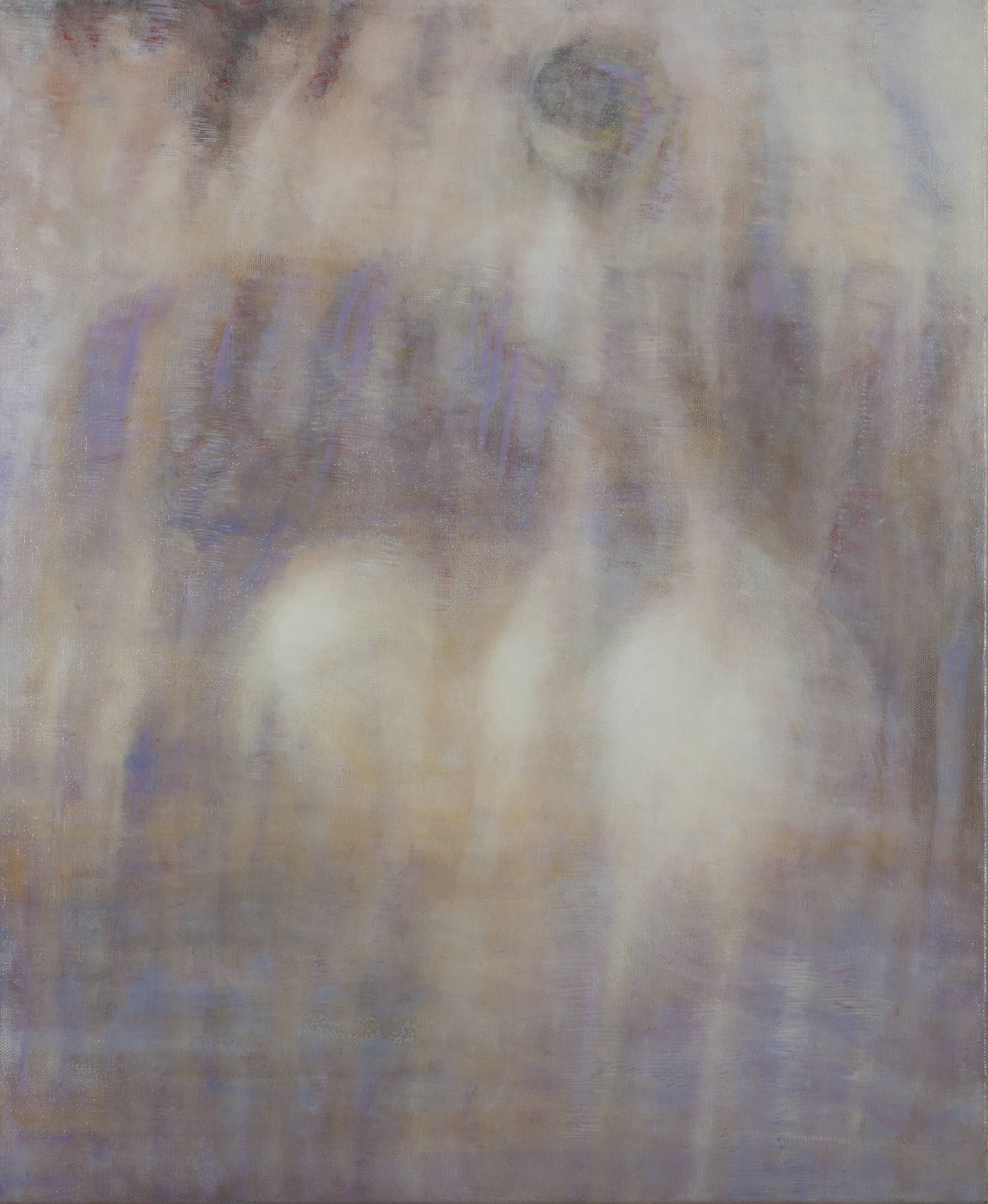
Bracha L. Ettinger, Eurydice, The Graces, Medusa. Oil painting, 2006–2012

From 1981 to 1992, her principal artwork consisted of drawing and mixed media on paper as well as notebooks and artist's books, where alongside theoretical work and conversations she made ink and wash painting and drawing. Since 1992, apart from her notebooks, most of her artwork consists of mixed media and oil paintings, with a few parallel series that spread over time like "Matrix — Family Album", "Autistwork" and "Eurydice", with themes of transgenerational transmission of personal and historical trauma, traces of memory and remnants of oblivion, the passage from pain to beauty Shoah and the World Wars, the gaze, light, color and the space, female body, womanhood and maternality, inspired by classical painting and creating an abstract space where the questions of beauty and sublime are renewed for our time.

According to Griselda Pollock, Catherine de Zegher and Chris Dercon, director of the Tate Modern who had chosen her work for the contemporary art section of the Pompidou Center's major exhibition of 20th Century art Face à l'Histoire, Ettinger has become one of the major artists of the New European Painting and a major feminist thinker. Along with painting she has worked on installations, theoretical research, lectures, video works, and "encounter events". Her paintings, photos, drawings, and notebooks have been exhibited at the Pompidou Centre, and the Stedelijk Museum in 1997. In the last decade, Ettinger's oil on canvas paintings involve figures like Medusa, Demeter and Persephone, and Eurydice, and the subject matter of the Pietà, the Kaddish, Eros, and Chronos. From 2010 onward, her work still consists mainly of oil paintings, notebooks (artist's books) and drawings, she is doing new media digitally animated video films where the images are multi-layered like her painting. In 2015, she participated with a solo show in the 14th Istanbul Biennial drafted and curated by Carolyn Christov-Bakargiev. In 2018-19 she participated with a solo show at the Kochi-Muziris Biennale 2018 in India.2019. Bracha L. Ettinger is represented by Andrew Kreps, New York and High Art, Paris.

=== Solo exhibitions ===
A selection:

- Bracha L. Ettinger: Eurydice - Kaddish – Medusa, Pompidou Centre, Paris (2024)
- Bracha Lichtenberg Ettinger. Radicants, Paris (2022).
- Bracha L. Ettinger. Andrew Kreps Gallery NY (2022).
- Bracha L. Ettinger: BRACHA's Notebooks. Castello di Rivoli Museum, Torino (2021–2023).
- Soloshow at Kochi Biennale, 2018.
- UB Anderson Gallery, Buffalo, 2018.
- Silesian Museum (Muzeum Śląskie w Katowicach), Katowich, 2017.
- Galería Polivalente in Guanajuato (Universidad de Guanajuato), Mexico (2015).
- Museo Leopoldo Flores. Univ. Autonóma del Estado de México, Toluca, Mexico (2014).
- Illuminations Gallery, Maynooth University, Ireland (2014).
- Freud's Dream Museum, St. Petersburg, Russia (2013).
- The State Museum of the History of St. Petersburg, Russia (2013).
- Casco, Utrecht (2012).
- Musée des Beaux-Arts d'Angers, France (2011).
- Fundació Antoni Tàpies, Barcelona (2010). (Alma Matrix. Bracha L. Ettinger and Ria Verhaeghe)
- Kuvataideakatemia / Finnish Academy of Fine Arts, Helsinki (2009).
- Freud Museum, London (2009).
- The Drawing Center, New York (2001).
- Centre for Fine Arts (The Palais des Beaux Arts), Brussels (2000).
- Pori Art Museum, Finland (1996), (Doctore and Patient. Bracha L. Ettinger and Sergei "Africa" Bugayev).
- Israel Museum, Jerusalem (1995).
- The Museum of Modern Art (MOMA), Oxford (1993).
- Galerie d'Art Contemporain du Centre Saint-Vincent, Herblay, France (1993).
- The Russian Ethnography Museum in St. Petersburg, Russia (1993).
- Le Nouveau Muséem, IAC — Institut d'art contemporain, Villeurbanne, France (1992).
- Goethe Institute, Paris (1990).
- Musée des Beaux-Arts et de la Dentelle de Calais, Calais (1988).
- The Pompidou Centre, Paris (1987).

=== Group exhibitions ===
A selection:

- Castello di Rivoli, Turin (Artists in a Time of War 2023).
- Castello di Rivoli, Turin (Espressioni Con Frazioni 2022).
- Castello di Rivoli, Turin (Espressioni. The Proposition 2020–2021).
- The Warehouse, Dallas (Psychic Wounds: Trauma in Art since 1945, 2020).
- Kochi-Muziris Biennale (2018–2019).
- Ekaterina Institute. Moscow (The Human Condition - The Hunted House, 2017–2018). Curator: Viktor Misiano.
- Bonnier Konsthall, Stockholm. (The Image of War, 2017). Curator: Theodor Ringborg.
- Gladstone Gallery, NY (Lyric on a Battlefield, 2017).
- MAS/KMSKA, Antwerpen (Encounters/Ontmoetingen. About art and emotion, 2017). Curator: Paul Vandenbroeck.
- GAM, Turin. (Colori, 2017). Curator: Carolyn Christov-Bakargiev with Marcella Beccaria, Elena Volpato.
- 14th Istanbul Biennial (Saltwater, 2015). Curator: Carolyn Christov-Bakargiev.
- Museum of Modern Art, Warsaw (In the Heart of the Country, 2013–2014).
- The Pompidou Centre Paris (ELLES@centrepompidou, 2010–2011).
- Herzliya Museum of Contemporary Art (Eventually we'll Die. Young Art of the Nineties, 2008). Curator: Doron Rabina.
- The Royal Museum of Fine Arts, Antwerp (Gorge(l), 2006–2007).
- Kiasma Museum of Contemporary Art, Helsinki (ARS 06 Biennale, 2006).
- Gothenburg Museum of Art (Aletheia, 2003).
- Villa Medici, Rome, (Memory, 1999). Curators: Laurence Bosse, Carolyn Christov-Bakargiev, Hans-Ulrich Obrist.
- Israel Museum, Jerusalem (Voices from Here and There [Mar'ee Makom, Mar'ee Adam], 1999). Curator: Meira Peri.
- Stedelijk Museum, Amsterdam (Kabinet, 1997).
- The Pompidou Centre (Face à l'Histoire, 1996). Curator Chris Dercon.
- Art Gallery of New South Wales, Sydney (Body, 1997).
- Art Gallery of Western Australia, Perth (Inside the Visible, 1997).
- Museum for Israeli Art, Ramat-Gan (Oh Mama, 1997).
- Institute of Contemporary Art (ICA) Boston, (Inside the Visible, 1996). Curator: Catherine de Zegher.
- National Museum of Women in the Arts, Washington, (Inside the Visible, 1997).
- Whitechapel Gallery, London (Inside the Visible, 1996).
- Israel Museum, Jerusalem (Routes of Wandering, 1992), Curator: Sarit Shapira.
- Tel Aviv Museum of Art (Israeli Art Now, 1991).
- Tel Aviv Museum of Art (Feminine Presence, 1990). Curator: Ellen Ginton.

== Reception ==
Ettinger's work consists mostly of oil painting and writing. Ettinger is now considered to be a prominent figure among both the French painters' and the Israeli art's scenes. Her art was analysed at length in the book Women Artists at the Millennium, in Griselda Pollock's Encounters in the Virtual Feminist Museum and in Catherine de Zegher's anthology Women's Work is Never Done. Her ideas in cultural theory, psychoanalysis, and French feminism (see Feminist theory and psychoanalysis) achieved recognition after the publication of Matrix and Metramorphosis (1992), fragments from her notebooks (Moma, Oxford, 1993) and The Matrixial Gaze (1995). Ettinger established a new area of studies in psychoanalysis, art and feminism. Over the last three decades, her work has been influential in art history.

== Psychoanalyst ==
Ettinger is a theoretician who invented and developed a language for a feminine-maternal-'matrixial' (matricial) dimension in artistic creativity and in ethics of care and responsibility. She coined the concept of matrixial (matricial) space and matrixial gaze first in her artistic Notebooks from 1985 onward, and in academic publications from 1992 onward.

Ettinger's 'matrixial theory' articulating transjectivity and transubjectivity in the subject and in human relationships had proposed an unconscious feminine/maternal and pre-maternal/prenatal time-space of feminine sexuality and femininity in all genders, which go together with ethics of care and wonder, 'seduction-into-life' and responsibility, where trans-subjectivity is in an ontology of string-like subject-subject (trans-subjective) and subject-object (transjective) transmissivity and affective co-emergence, transformed the way to think both the feminine and the human subject, both the analyst in transference relation and the analysant in its relation to her, in psychoanalysis. Working on the question of trauma, memory and oblivion at the intersections of human subjectivity, feminine sexuality, maternal subjectivity, psychoanalysis, art and aesthetics, she contributed to psychoanalysis the idea of a feminine-maternal sphere of sexuality and ethics, function, and structure where symbolic and imaginary dimensions are based on femaleness in the real (the meaning of matrix is womb). This dimension, as symbolic, contributes to ethical thinking about human responsibility to one another and to the world. The French philosopher Jean-Francois Lyotard related to Ettinger's writing and painting in two famous articles written in 1993 and 1995, Anima Minima (Diffracted Traces) andL'anamnese (anamnesis). She is a senior clinical psychologist, and a supervising and training psychoanalyst. Her artistic practice and her articulation, since 1985, of what has become known as the matrixial theory of trans-subjectivity have transformed contemporary debates in contemporary art, psychoanalysis, women's studies, and cultural studies. Ettinger was an analysand of Ronald Laing in London and of Piera Aulagnier in Paris. She is member of the Tel Aviv Institute for Contemporary Psychoanalysis (TAICP), the New Lacanian School (NLS) and the World Association of Psychoanalysis (AMP / WAP).

For Ettinger, the Freudian attitude to psychoanalysis is crucial as it emphasizes the phantasmatic value of materials that arise during regression. To Freud and Lacan she adds, however, a feminine-maternal space-time with its particular structures, functions, Eros, Aesthetic, Ethics and ethical potentiality (she names matrixial proto-ethics) and dynamics in the unconscious. She claims that, in a similar way, when seduction is assigned to the paternal figure during regression, it is recognized in most cases as a result of the therapeutic process itself. The analyst therefore must become aware to her capacity for a 'seduction into life' as well as for retraumatizing the analysand. A matrixial ethical countertransference can be worked-through only in 'empathy within compassion' in where therapist avoids parent-blaming. The analyst develops her psychic womb-space to be able to work with the matrixial sphere for the directing of healing. Therapists must likewise realize that during regression phantasmatic maternal "not-enoughness" appears and must also be recognized as the result of the process itself, and be worked-through without the mother-hating that Ettinger considers contributes to a "psychotization" of the subject, which blocks the passage from rage to sorrow and from there to compassion. To be able to recognize the phantasmatic status of the psychic material arising during therapy, the Lacanian concepts of the Symbolic, the Imaginary and the Real are useful to her. Ettinger works between the fields of psychoanalysis and philosophy to change Ethics according to the feminine-maternal-matrixial source after Levinas and Lacan. She is also rethinging and gives new meaning the concepts of beauty and of the sublime.

=== Psychoanalytic theory ===
==== Major concepts ====
Ettinger revolutionized the field of psychoanalysis and cultural studies when she coined in artist's books (Notebooks) that she exposed publicly starting from 1985 and in a long series of articles published since 1991 the concept of the matrixial (matricial) space and proposed the feminine matrixial time-space of feminine/prenatal encounter-event as source of human aesthetics and proto-ethics, and femininity as the deep core of ethics, which enters the human subjectivity via the maternal.

Ettinger invented and developed the matrixial trans-subjectivity theory, or simply "The Matrixial", with original concepts like matrixial gaze, borderlinking, borderspacing, matrixial time-space, copoiesis, wit(h)nessing, co/in-habit(u)ation, transubjectivity, transjectivity, fascinance, seduction-into-life and carriance. She named the processes of transformation in a matrixial sphere: metramorphoses, and proposed the coemergnce of partial-subjects of I and non-I, female-prematernal-prenatal encounter, Encounter-event, ethical seduction into life, uncanny compassion and uncanny awe (that supplement the uncanny anxiety), fascinance, proto-ethics, being-toward-birth with being-toward-birthing, seduction into life, empathy within compassion, carriance (caring-carrying in the unconscious space of psychic pregnancy) and the matricial feminine-maternal Eros.

==== The early theory: from 1985 through the 1990s ====
Ettinger invented the concept 'matrixial space' ('matricial space' from etymology of 'womb'), matrixial gaze, matrixial sphere, a feminine-maternal and feminine-prematernal transjective dimension, space, function, Eros and dynamics in the human Unconscious that as the source of humanized ethics and aesthetics, and developed a theoretical philosophical field in her artist's books and notebooks starting 1985, and in books and journals printed in academic journals from 1991 onwards. She had suggested that pre-natal impressions, connected to the phantasmatic and traumatic real of the pregnant becoming-mother, are trans-inscribed in the emerging subject and form the primary phase and position of the human psyche. "I" and "non-I", without rejection and without symbiotic fusion, conjointly inscribe memory traces that are dispersed asymmetrically but in a trans-subjective mode. Trans-subjective mental and affective unconscious "strings", connecting the prenatal emerging subject to the archaic m/Other, open unconscious routes ("feminine", non phallic, in both males and females) that enable subjectivizing processes all throughout life whenever a new matrixial encounter-event takes place. The matrixial encounter-event forms specific aesthetical and ethical accesses to the Other. Ettinger articulated the 'matrixial gaze' and the process of 'metramorphosis' and 'co-poiesis'. This allows new understanding of trans-generational transmission, trauma and artistic processes. Ettinger formulates the woman(girl)-to-woman(mother) difference as the first sexual difference for females to be viewed first of all according to the matrixial parameters. The feminine-maternal Eros informs also the father/son and mother/son relations. According to Ettinger, in parallel but also before expressions of abjection (Julia Kristeva) or rejection (Freud on Narcissism) of the other, primary compassion, awe and fascinance (which are unconscious psychic affective accesses to the other, and which join reattunement and differentiating-in-jointness by borderlinking) occur. The combination of fascinance and primary compassion does not enter the economy of social exchange, attraction and rejection; it has particular forms of Eros and of resistance that can inspire the political sphere and reach action and speech that is ethical-political without entering any political institutional organization. The infant's primary compassion is a proto-ethical psychological means that joins the aesthetical fascinance and creates a feel-knowing that functions at best within maternal (and also parental) compassionate hospitality. Awareness to the matrixial time-space, pre-maternal com-passion and maternal compassion together with the ethical 'seduction-into-life' it involves, is source of responsibility. Here, one witnesses in jointness: The I wit(h)ness while borderlinking (bordureliance) to the non-I and borderspacing (bordurespacement) from the other. Ettinger calls for the recognition of the matrixial transference as a dimension in the transferential relationships in psychoanalysis. They must entail besideness to (and not a split from) the archaic the m/Other (Autremere) and parental figures; jointness-in-differentiation rather than their exclusion. She sees in the trans-subjectivity a distinct dimension of human specific linkage and shareability, different from, and supplementary to "inter-subjectivity" and "self" psychology. Her most prominent and comprehensive book regarding this theory is "The Matrixial Borderspace" (reprint of essays from 1994 to 1999) published in French in 1999 and in English in 2006, but her most recent concepts are mainly elaborated in the different essays printed in 2005–2006.

==== The theory in the 2000s ====
Her more recent artistic and theoretical work centers around the spiritual in art and ethics. In the domain of psychoanalysis, around the question of same-sex differences, the primary feminine difference is the difference opened between woman (girl) and woman (m/Other), maternal subjectivity, maternal/pregnance Eros of com-passion, the effects of compassion and awe and the passion for borderlinking and borderspacing and the idea that three kinds of fantasy (that she names Mother-fantasies) should be recognized, when they appear in a state of regression aroused by therapy itself, as primal: Mother-fantasies of Not-enoughness, Devouring and Abandonment. Their mis-recognition in psychoanalysis (and analytical therapy), together with the ignorance of maternal Eros of com-passion leads to catastrophic blows to the matrixial daughter-mother tissue and hurts the maternal potentiality of the daughter herself, in the sense that attacking the "non-I" is always also attacking the "I" that dwells inside an "I"-and-"non-I" trans-subjective matrixial (feminine-maternal) tissue. Contributing to Self psychoanalysis after Heinz Kohut, Ettinger articulated the difference between com-passionate borderlinking, compassion (as affect) and empathy, and between "empathy without compassion" and "empathy within compassion", claiming that the analyst's empathy without compassion harms the matrixial psychic tissue of the analysand, while empathy within compassion leads to creativity and to the broadening of the ethical horizon. Ettinger explains how by empathy (toward the patient's complaints) without compassion (toward the patient's surrounding past and present family figures, no less than toward the patient itself), the therapist "produces" the patient's real mother as a "ready-made monster-mother" figure, that serves to absorb complaints of all kinds, and thus, a dangerous splitting is induced between the "good" mother figure (the therapist) and a "bad" mother figure (the real mother). This splitting is destructive in both internal and external terms, and mainly for the daughter-mother relations, since the I and non-I are in any case always trans-connected, and therefore any split and projected hate (toward such figures) will turn into a self-hate in the woman/daughter web. Such a concept of subjectivity, where "non-I" is trans-connected to the "I", has deep ethical implications as well as far-reaching sociological and political implications that have been further developed by Griselda Pollock in order to rethink modern and postmodern art and History. Ettinger's recent theoretical proposals starting around 2008 include the three Shocks of maternality and the paternal infanticide impulses (Laius Complex) Carriance and the Demeter–Persephone Complex, working around Greek Mythology and the Hebrew Bible, the woman artists Eva Hesse, Hilma af Klint and Emma Kunz and the poets and writers Sylvia Plath, Marguerite Duras and Alejandra Pizarnik.

== Other activities ==
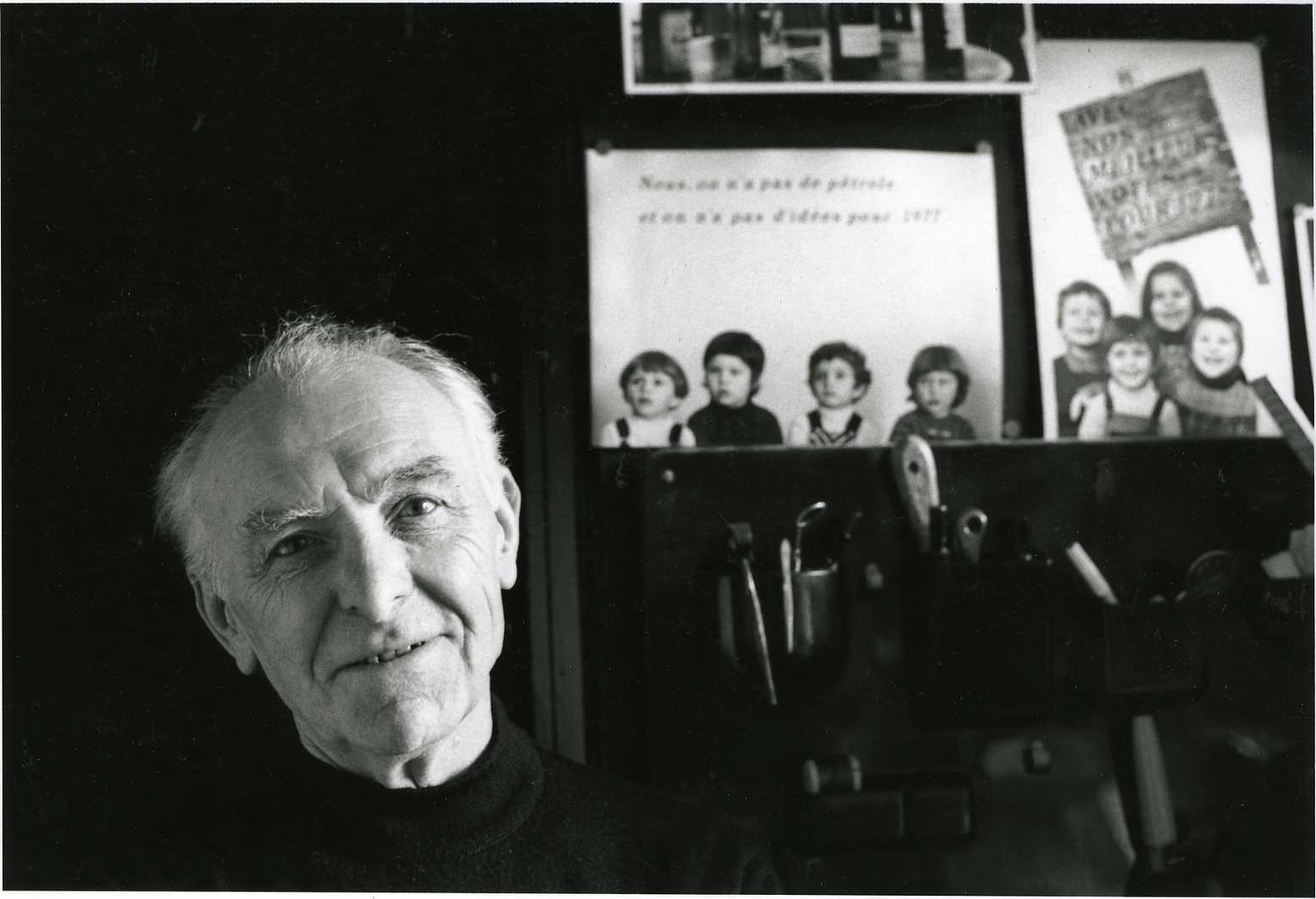
Robert Doisneau photographed by Ettinger in his studio in Montrouge, 1992

Ettinger led the biggest rescue, evacuation and saving operation in the history of the Middle East: saving the drowning young men of the Eilat shipwreck (in 1967), when she was 19 years old. She was wounded during the operation and suffered shell-shock after it. More than a half-century later, the details of this event were declassified, and she was awarded the highest Air-Force Medal for Heroism.

Ettinger is a supporter of human rights and stands for coexistence of two states, Israel and Palestine, side by side in mutual respect. She is feminist activist for peace and against the occupation for few decades, engaged in the efforts towards cohabitation in the frame of four different organizations of Israelis and Palestinians collaborating: "Women Make Peace", "Forum of Bereaved Families", "Combatants for Peace" and "Physicians for Human Rights" ("PHR-Israel"). Ettinger contributes to the organization as senior clinical psychologist, attending Palestinian patients in needed areas in the Palestinian territories.

Ettinger is known for her portrait photography, taken in the context of conversation projects. Some of her portraits, like those of Christian Boltanski, Jean-François Lyotard, Edmond Jabès, Emmanuel Lévinas, Robert Doisneau and Yeshayahu Leibowitz appear in several official publications and collections.

=== Fascinance: Forum for Ettinger Studies ===
The other and the earth need to be known through affective communicaring in self-fragilization. The knowledge revealed in this way, of the invisible chords to which our senses are not yet attuned, is at the basis of the ethical obligation to attend to the vulnerability of the other, human, animal, and even our shared earth, through care and compassion and in wonder and reverence. Lets work together against retraumatization and toward an understanding of a human subject which is informed by feminine transubjectivity in all genders, and become sensitive to the particular Eros of borderlinking between each I and non-I, which is a kind of love...

— Bracha L. Ettinger on launch of Fascinance: Forum for Ettinger Studies started by Srishti Madurai

Fascinance is forum which was started by Srishti Madurai in South India on 24 December 2013 which offers Introductory Course in Ettingerian Psychoanalysis

The aims of the forum are:

- To Read, Study and Discuss the works of Bracha L. Ettinger.
- To apply the matrixial theory in arts, philosophy, psychoanalysis and art criticism.
- To Find the possible implications of the concept of "non-life" of Bracha Ettinger in conjunction with the knowledge from various branches of biology such as clinical embryology, nenonatal immunology and developmental biology etc.
- To elaborate on the works on Matrixial Thanatos and Matrixial Eros and how Ettinger's approach differs from the traditional views on death drive.
- To identify how the Ettingerian theory differs from other psychoanalytic tradition and to discuss the philosophical aspects of matrixial borderspace.
- To identify the possible connections of Ettinger's works with natural sciences and social sciences.

== Publications ==
Ettinger is author of several books and more than eighty psychoanalytical essays elaborating different aesthetical, ethical, psychoanalytical and artistic aspects of the matrixial. She is co-author of volumes of conversation with Emmanuel Levinas, Edmond Jabès, Craigie Horsfield, Félix Guattari and Christian Boltanski. Her book Regard et Espace-de-Bord Matrixiels (essays 1994–1999) appeared in French in 1999 (La lettre volée), and has been published in English as The Matrixial Borderspace (2006, University of Minnesota Press, edited by Brian Massumi and foreword by Judith Butler and Griselda Pollock). Ettinger is one of the leading intellectuals associated with contemporary French feminism and feminist psychoanalytical thought alongside Julia Kristeva and Luce Irigaray. The journal Theory Culture & Society dedicated an issue to her work [TC&S, Vol.21, n.1] in 2004.

=== Selected books ===
- Matrixial Subjectivity, Aesthetics, Ethics. Vol 1: 1990-2000. Selected papers edited with Introduction by Griselda Pollock. Pelgrave Macmillan 2020; ISBN 978-1-137-34515-8
- And My Heart Wound-space. On the occasion of Bracha's Soloshow at The 14th Istanbul Biennial "Saltwater" curated by Carolyn Christov-Bakargiev. The Wild Pansy Press, University of Leeds, 2015; ISBN 978-1-900687-55-3 (with 4 essays by Bracha L. Ettinger, foreword by Carolyn Christov-Bakargiev, and texts by, among others, Griselda Pollock, Nicolas Bourriaud, and Christine Buci-Glucksmann)
- The Matrixial Borderspace. (Essays from 1994 to 1999). University of Minnesota Press (2006); ISBN 0-8166-3587-0
- Proto-ética matricial. Spanish Edition translated and Introduced by Julian Gutierrez Albilla (Gedisa 2019); ISBN 978-84-17690-86-1
- Yhdessatuotanto. Translated by Akseli Virtanen et al. Helsinki: Tutkijaliitto (Polemos-sarja), 2009.
- Thrown. Poems by James Wagner to Paintings by Bracha L. Ettinger. There Press (2014)
- Regard et Espace-de-bord matrixiels. Brussels: La lettre volee (1999); ISBN 2-87317-102-2
- Matrix et le Voyage à Jerusalem de C.B. [Conversation with Christian Boltanski 1989, portrait photographs of C.B in his studio, by BRACHA, 1990, notebook fragments 1985-1989]. Artist's book. Paris: BLE Atelier (1991)
- Matrix. Halal(a) – Lapsus. Notes on Painting, 1985–1992. Translated by Joseph Simas. Oxford: MOMA (1993)
- The Matrixial Gaze (1994)
  Feminist Arts & Histories Network – Dept. of Fine Art, Leeds University (1995)
- Artworking 1985-1999 (2000)

=== Selected publications ===
- "What is Intelligence". Spike Art Magazine, vol 77: 36-37 (2023)
- "Beyond the Death-drive, Beyond the Life-drive—Being-toward-Birthing with Being-toward-Birth. Copoiesis and the Matrixial Eros—Metafeminist Notes", Aberrant Nuptials. Leuven University Press (2019).
- "Translucent Fore-images. Glowing through Painting." Colori. Torino: Castello di Rivoli & GAM, SilvanaEditorials (2017)
- "Laius Complex and Shocks of Maternality. Reading Franz Kafka and Sylvia Plath", Interdisciplinary Handbook of Trauma and Culture, eds. Y. Ataria et al., NY & Heidelberg: Springer (2016).
- "And My Heart, Wound-Space With-in Me. The Space of Carriance", And My Heart Wound-Space. 14th Istanbul Biennial. Leeds: Wild Pansy Press (2015)
- "Carriance, Copoiesis and the Subreal", Saltwater. 14th Istanbul Biennial Catalogue. Ed. by Carolyn Christov Bokargiev (2015)
- "The Sublime and Beauty beyond Uncanny Anxiety". In: Intellectual Birdhouse. Artistic Practice as Research. Edited by F. Dombois, U. M. Bauer, C. Marais and M. Schwab. London: Koening Books (2011);ISBN 978-3-86335-118-2
- "Antigone With(out) Jocaste". In: Interrogating Antigone. Edited by S. E. Wilmer and A. Zukauskaite. Oxford University Press, 2010 (189–214);ISBN 978-0-19-955921-3
- "Communicaring: Reflexion around Hiroshima mon amour". In: PostGender: Sexuality and Performativeivity in Japanese Culture. Edited by Ayelet Zohar. Newcastle upon Tyne: Cambridge Scholars Publishing, 2010;ISBN 965-7067-61-8
- "Diotima and the Matrixial Transference: Psychoanalytical Encounter-Event as Pregnancy in Beauty", Across the Threshold (Explorations of Liminality in Literature). Edited by C. N. van der Merwe and H. Viljoen. New York: Peter Lang. 2007; ISBN 978-1-4331-0002-4
- "Fragilization and Resistance". In: Bracha L. Ettinger: Fragilization and Resistance. Edited by Tero Nauha and Akseli Virtanen. Finnish Academy of Fine Arts with Aivojen yhteistyo, Helsinki, 2009. Maternal Studies
- "From Proto-ethical Compassion to Responsibility: Besidedness, and the three Primal Mother-Phantasies of Not-enoughness, Devouring and Abandonment", Athena: Philosophical Studies. Nr. 2 (Vilnius: Versus). 2006; ISSN 1822-5047
- "Com-passionate Co-response-ability, Initiation in Jointness, and the link x of Matrixial Virtuality". In: Gorge(l). Oppression and Relief in Art. Edited by Sofie Van Loo. Royal Museum of Fine Art. Antwerpen, 2006; ISBN 90-76979-35-9
- "Gaze-and-touching the Not Enough Mother", Eva Hesse Drawing. Edited by Catherine de Zegher, NY/New Haven: The Drawing Center/Yale University Press. 2006; ISBN 0-300-11618-7
- "Matrixial Trans-subjectivity". Theory Culture & Society – TCS, 23:2–3. 2006; ISSN 0263-2764
- "Art and Healing Matrixial Transference Between the Aesthetical and the Ethical." In Catalogue: ARS 06 Biennale. 68–75; 76–81. Helsinki: Kiasma Museum of Contemporary Art (2006)
- "Fascinance. The Woman-to-woman (Girl-to-m/Other) Matrixial Feminine Difference". In: Psychoanalysis and the Image. Edited by Griselda Pollock. Oxford: Blackwell (2006); ISBN 1-4051-3461-5
- "Art-and-Healing Oeuvre." 3 X Abstraction. Edited by Catherine de Zegher and Hendel Teicher, 199–231. NY/New Haven: The Drawing Center/Yale University Press (2005); ISBN 0-300-10826-5
- "Trenzado y escena primitiva del ser-de-a-tres" (7 June 2000). In: Jacques-Alain Miller, Los usos del lapso, Los cursos psicoanaliticos de Jacques-Alain Miller. Buenos Aires: Paidos. 2004, pp. 466–481; ISBN 950-12-8855-2
- "Copoiesis", Ephemeraweb.org (2005)
- "Re - In - De - Fuse", Othervoices.org (1999)
- Weaving a Woman Artist With-in the Matrixial Encounter-Event", Theory, Culture and Society Journal, No. 21 (2004)
- "Trans-subjective transferential borderspace" (1996). Reprinted in Brian Massumi (ed.), A Shock to Thought. (Expression after Deleuze and Guattari). London & NY: Routledge, 2002, pp. 215–239; ISBN 0-415-23804-8
- "The Red Cow Effect" (First printed in 1996 in: Act 2, ISSN 1360-4287). Reprinted in: Mica Howe & Sarah A. Aguiar (eds.), He Said, She Says. Fairleigh Dickinson University press & London: Associated University Press, 2001, pp. 57–88; ISBN 0-8386-3915-1
- "Matrixial Gaze and Screen: Other than Phallic and Beyond the Late Lacan." In: Laura Doyle (ed.) Bodies of Resistance. Evanston, Illinois: Northwestern University Press, 2001, pp. 103–143; ISBN 0-8101-1847-5
- "Art as the Transport-Station of Trauma", Bracha Lichtenberg Ettinger: Artworking 1985–1999, Ghent-Amsterdam: Ludion & Brussels: Palais des Beaux-Arts, 2000, pp. 91–115. (ISBN 90-5544-283-6) Extract in
- "Transgressing with-in-to the feminine." (1997) Reprinted in: Penny Florence & Nicola Foster (eds.), Differential Aesthetics, London: Ashgate, 2000, pp. 183–210; ISBN 0-7546-1493-X
- "Trauma and Beauty." In: Kjell R. Soleim [ed.], Fatal Women. Journal of the Center for Women's and Gender Research, Bergen Univ., Vol. 11: 115–128 (1999)
- "The Feminine/Prenatal Weaving in the Matrixial Subjectivity-as-Encounter." Psychoanalytic Dialogues, VII:3, The Analytic Press, New York, 1997, pp. 363–405; ISSN 1048-1885
- "Metramorphic Borderlinks and Matrixial Borderspace." In: John Welchman (ed.), Rethinking Borders, Minnesota University Press, 1996. 125–159; ISBN 0-333-56580-0
- The Matrixial Gaze. (1994), Feminist Arts & Histories Network, Dept. of Fine Art, Leeds University, 1995; ISBN 978-0-9524899-0-0. Reprinted as Ch. I in The Matrixial Borderspace.
- "The Becoming Threshold of Matrixial Borderlines.". In: Robertson et als. (eds.) Travelers' Tales. Routledge, London, 1994, pp. 38–62; ISBN 0-415-07016-3
- Matrix . Halal(a) — Lapsus. Notes on Painting, 1985–1992. Translated by Joseph Simas. Museum Of Modern Art, Oxford, 1993; ISBN 0-905836-81-2. (Reprinted in Artworking 1985–1999. Ghent: Ludion, 2000; ISBN 90-5544-283-6)
- "Matrix and metramorphosis". Differences: A Journal of Feminist Cultural Studies. 4 (3). Indiana University Press: 176–208. 1992.

=== Conversations ===
- "From transference to the aesthetic paradigm: a conversation with Felix Guattari" (1989). Reprinted in Brian Massumi (ed.), A Shock to Thought. London & NY: Routeledge, 2002; ISBN 0-415-23804-8.
- Matrix et le voyage à Jérusalem de C.B. (1989). Artist book, limited edition, with 60 photos of Christian Boltanski by Ettinger, and Conversation between Ettinger and Boltanski. 1991.
- Edmond Jabès in conversation with Bracha Ettinger (1990, selection). "This is the Desert, Nothing Strikes Root Here", Routes Of Wandering. The Israel Museum, Jerusalem, 1991, pp. 246–256; ISBN 965-278-116-9.
- Edmond Jabès in conversation with Bracha L. Ettinger (1990, selection). A Threshold Where We are Afraid. Translated by Annemarie Hamad and Scott Lerner. MOMA, Oxford, 1993; ISBN 0-905836-86-3
- Emmanuel Levinas in conversation with Bracha L. Ettinger (1991–93, selection). Time is the Breath of the Spirit. Translated by C. Ducker and J. Simas. MOMA (Museum of Modern Art), Oxford, 1993; ISBN 0-905836-85-5
- Emmanuel Levinas in conversation with Bracha L. Ettinger (1991–93, selection). "What would Eurydice Say?"/ "Que dirait Eurydice?" Reprint of Le féminin est cette différence inouïe (livre d'artiste, 1994 that includes the text of Time is the Breath of the Spirit). Trans. C. Ducker and J. Simas. Reprinted to coincide with the Kabinet exhibition, Stedelijk Museum, Amsterdam, Paris: BLE Atelier, 1997; ISBN 2-910845-08-7. Reprinted in: Athena: Philosophical Studies. Vol. 2 (Vilnius: Versus); ISSN 1822-5047.
- "Working-Through." A conversation between Bracha Lichtenberg Ettinger and Craigie Horsfield. In: Bracha Lichtenberg Ettinger: Eurydice Series. Drawing Papers, n.24. NY: The Drawing Center. 2001, pp. 37–62.
- "Conversation: Craigie Horsfield and Bracha L. Ettinger". September 2004. In: Craigie Horsfield, Relation. Edited by Catherine de Zegher. Paris: Jeu de Paume, 2006.
- Conversation between Bracha L. Ettinger and Akseli Virtanen, "Art, Memory, Resistance." In Framework: The Finnish Art Review 4: Permanent Transience and in Web Journal Ephemera, vol. 5, no. X.

=== Lectures and seminars ===
- Bracha L. Ettinger. Beyond Uncanny Anxiety. Lecture at ICI Berlin, 12 November 2010.
- Bracha L. Ettinger. Inspiration, Inspiriting and Transpiriting. Fragilization and Resistance in Art(). Lecture in: The Old Brand New Series: New Knowledge. De Appel at the City Theatre, Amsterdam. 10 February 2009.
- Bracha Ettinger. Feminine and the Maternal in the Matrixial Transference, Lecture at the University of Puerto Rico, Río Piedras (2008)
- Bracha Ettinger. On the Matrixial Borderspace, Lecture at European Graduate School (2007)
- Bracha Ettinger. Psychoanalysis and Aesthetics. Lecture at AHRB Centre CATH (July 2004)

== See also ==
- New European Painting
- Feminist Psychoanalysis
- French Feminism
- The Sublime (Jean-François Lyotard)
- 20th century Women Artists
- Écriture féminine
- Gender studies
- Feminist film theory
