= Pam Cook =

British academic

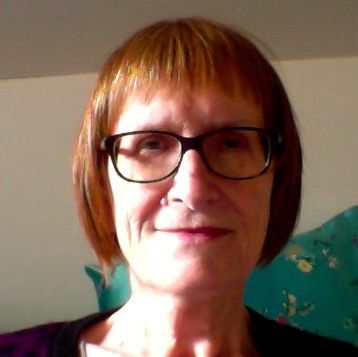
- Born: 6 January 1943 (age 83); Farnborough, Hampshire, UK
- Occupations: Writer, historian, academic
- Writing career
- Period: 1974–present

Pam Cook (born 6 January 1943) is Professor Emerita in Film at the University of Southampton. She was educated at Sir William Perkins's School, Chertsey, Surrey and Birmingham University, where she was taught by Stuart Hall, Richard Hoggart, Malcolm Bradbury, and David Lodge. Along with Laura Mulvey and Claire Johnston, she was a pioneer of 1970s Anglo-American feminist film theory. Her collaboration with Claire Johnston on the work of Hollywood film director Dorothy Arzner provoked debate among feminist film scholars over the following decades.

In the mid-1980s, Cook co-authored and edited the leading film studies textbook The Cinema Book for the British Film Institute (BFI). From 1985 to 1994, she was Associate Editor and contributor to the BFI magazines Monthly Film Bulletin and Sight and Sound, before becoming a lecturer at the University of East Anglia. In 1998, she was appointed the first Professor of European Film and Media at the University of Southampton.

Since her retirement in 2006, she continues to publish books and articles on moving image history and culture. In 2007, she set up the independent campaigning blog bfiwatch to monitor developments at the BFI, and she has extended her work to scholarly videography.

== Publications ==
=== Books ===
- Dancing with Pixels: Undoing Representation, London: Open Book, 2019.
- Nicole Kidman, London: BFI Publishing/Palgrave, 2012. Nicole Kidman
- Baz Luhrmann, London: BFI Publishing/Palgrave, 2010. Baz Luhrmann
- The Cinema Book, Third Edition, London: British Film Institute, 2007.
- Screening the Past: Memory and Nostalgia in Cinema, Oxford and New York: Routledge, 2005.
- I Know Where I'm Going!, BFI Film Classics, London: British Film Institute, 2002. (on I Know Where I'm Going!)
- The Cinema Book, Second Edition, London: British Film Institute, 1999. With Mieke Bernink.
- Gainsborough Pictures, London and Washington: Cassell, 1997. Gainsborough Pictures
- Fashioning the Nation: Costume and Identity in British Cinema, London: British Film Institute, 1996.
- Women and Film: A Sight and Sound Reader, London: Scarlet Press/Philadelphia: Temple University Press, 1993. With Philip Dodd.
- The Cinema Book, London: British Film Institute, 1985. The Cinema Book

=== Selected articles ===
- 'Revisiting Performance: Nicole Kidman's Enactment of Stardom', in Sabrina Qiong Yu and Guy Austin (eds). Revisiting Star Studies: Cultures, Themes and Methods, Edinburgh: Edinburgh University Press, 2017. Nicole Kidman
- 'Because She's Worth It: The Natural Blonde from Grace Kelly to Nicole Kidman', Celebrity Studies 2015, special dossier on Blondes in Cinema. Grace Kelly; Nicole Kidman; Grace of Monaco
- 'Picturing Natacha Rambova: Design and Celebrity Performance in the 1920s', Screening the Past 40, September 2015, special dossier on Women and the Silent Screen. Natacha Rambova; Rudolph Valentino; Salome; Alla Nazimova
- 'Text, Paratext and Subtext: Reading Mildred Pierce as Maternal Melodrama', SEQUENCE: Serial Studies in Media, Film and Music, 2.2, 2015. Mildred Pierce (miniseries); Mildred Pierce; Mildred Pierce; Todd Haynes; Videography
- 'Dancing with Pixels: Digital Artefacts, Memory and the Beauty of Loss', The Cine-Files 7, Fall 2014. In the Mood for Love; Videography
- 'Sweetie′, Metro [Australia] 181, Winter 2014. Sweetie (film); Jane Campion; Cinema of Australia
- 'History in the Making: Sofia Coppola's Marie Antoinette and the New Auteurism', in Tom Brown and Belen Vidal (eds). The Biopic in Contemporary Film Culture (AFI Readers), New York: Routledge, 2013. Sofia Coppola; Marie Antoinette; Biopics
- 'Beyond Adaptation: Mirrors, Memory and Melodrama in Todd Haynes's Mildred Pierce, Mildred Pierce dossier, Screen 54:3, Autumn 2013. Mildred Pierce (miniseries); Mildred Pierce; Mildred Pierce; Todd Haynes
- 'Labours of Love: In Praise of Fan Websites', Frames 1 (1), July 2012.
- 'Another Story: Myth and History in Bonnie and Clyde (1967)', in Tom Brown and James Walters (eds), Film Moments: Criticism, History, Theory, London: BFI/Palgrave Macmillan, 2010. Bonnie and Clyde
- 'Sofia Coppola', in Yvonne Tasker (ed.), Fifty Contemporary Film Directors, Oxford and New York: Routledge, 2010. Sofia Coppola
- ‘Transnational Utopias: Baz Luhrmann and Australian Cinema’, Transnational Cinemas 1 (1), 2010. Baz Luhrmann; Cinema of Australia
- ‘On Memorialising Gainsborough Studios’, Journal of British Cinema and Television 6 (2), 2009. Gainsborough Pictures
- ‘Whatever Happened to BFI Publishing?’, Cinema Journal 47 (4), Summer 2008. The Cinema Book
- ‘An American in Paris’, in Mandy Merck (ed.), America First: Naming the Nation in US Film, Oxford and New York: Routledge, 2007. An American in Paris
- ‘Portrait of a Lady: Sofia Coppola’, Sight and Sound vol. 16, no. 11, November 2006. Sofia Coppola
- 'Rethinking Nostalgia: In the Mood for Love and Far from Heaven', in Screening the Past: Memory and Nostalgia in Cinema, Oxford and New York: Routledge, 2005. Wong Kar-wai; Todd Haynes
- ' "Sean Connery Is James Bond": Re-fashioning British Masculinity in the 1960s', in Rachel Moseley (ed.), Fashioning Film Stars: Dress, Culture, Identity, London: British Film Institute, 2005. With Claire Hines. Sean Connery
- ‘The Trouble with Sex: Diana Dors and the Blonde Bombshell Phenomenon’, in Bruce Babington (ed.), British Stars and Stardom: From Alma Taylor to Sean Connery, Manchester: Manchester University Press, 2001. Diana Dors
- 'No Fixed Address: The Women's Picture from Outrage to Blue Steel', in Steve Neale and Murray Smith (eds), Contemporary Hollywood Cinema, London and New York: Routledge, 1998. Ida Lupino; Kathryn Bigelow
- 'Neither Here Nor There: National Identity in Gainsborough Costume Drama', in Andrew Higson (ed.), Dissolving Views: Key Articles on British Cinema, London and Washington: Cassell, 1996.
- 'Outrage (1950)', in Annette Kuhn (ed.), Queen of the 'B's: Ida Lupino Behind the Camera, Trowbridge: Flicks Books, 1995. Ida Lupino; Outrage
- 'Border Crossings: Women and Film in Context', in Pam Cook and Philip Dodd (eds), Women and Film: A Sight and Sound Reader, London: Scarlet Press/Philadelphia: Temple University Press, 1993.
- 'Women in the Western', in Edward Buscombe (ed.), The BFI Companion to the Western, London: British Film Institute/André Deutsch, 1988. Reprinted in Jim Kitses and Gregg Rickman (eds), The Western Reader, New York: Limelight, 1998.
- 'Mandy: Daughter of Transition', in Charles Barr (ed.), All Our Yesterdays: 90 Years of British Cinema, London: British Film Institute, 1986. Mandy (film)
- 'Melodrama and the Women's Picture', in Sue Aspinall and Robert Murphy (eds), BFI Dossier 18: Gainsborough Melodrama, London: British Film Institute, 1983. Gainsborough melodramas
- 'Masculinity in Crisis? Tragedy and Identification in Raging Bull', Screen vol. 23, no. 3/4, Sept/Oct 1982. Raging Bull; Martin Scorsese
- 'Duplicity in Mildred Pierce', in E. Ann Kaplan (ed.), Women in Film Noir, London: British Film Institute, 1978. Revised edition 1998. Mildred Pierce
- 'Exploitation Films and Feminism', Screen vol.17, no. 2, Summer 1976. Stephanie Rothman
- 'Approaching the Work of Dorothy Arzner', in Claire Johnston (ed.), Dorothy Arzner: Towards a Feminist Cinema, London: British Film Institute, 1975. Dorothy Arzner
- 'The Place of Woman in the Cinema of Raoul Walsh', in Phil Hardy (ed.), Raoul Walsh, Edinburgh: Edinburgh Film Festival, 1974. With Claire Johnston. Reprinted in Barry Keith Grant (ed.), Auteurs and Authorship: A Reader, Oxford: Blackwell, 2008. Raoul Walsh; The Revolt of Mamie Stover
