= List of murals by Luc Tuymans =

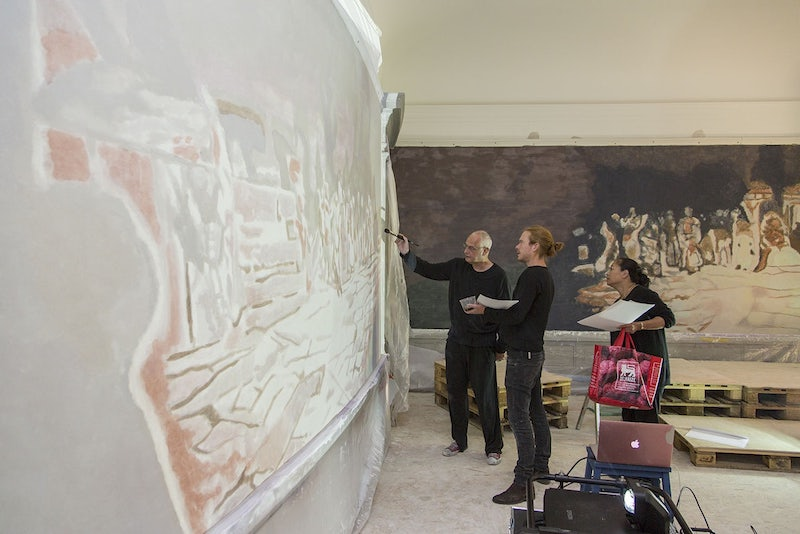
Luc Tuymans painting a fresco mural in 2017 at the Museum of Fine Arts, Ghent.

List of Murals by Luc Tuymans is a list of mural paintings and other murals by the Belgian artist Luc Tuymans (born June 14, 1958). Tuymans is best known for his paintings which explore our relationship with history and confront our seeming ability to ignore it. World War II is a recurring theme in his work. He is a key figure of the generation of European figurative painters who gained renown at a time when many believed the medium had lost its relevance due to the new digital age. Much of Tuymans’ work deals with moral complexity, specifically the coexistence of ‘good’ and ‘evil’. His subjects range from major historical events such as the Holocaust to the seemingly inconsequential or banal: wallpaper, Christmas decorations or everyday objects for example.

Tuymans has made about fifty site-specific murals since the mid-1990s, five permanent and the rest temporarily created for exhibitions. The type of mural techniques used is either acrylic paint or fresco mural applied directly on the existing wall surfaces. On rare occasions, he also made fabric murals, which are based on drawings that are scanned and mechanically produced.

The listing is ordered by type of mural and then by year. Most of the references come from the comprehensive catalogue raisonné edited by German art historian Eva Meyer-Hermann and published by the David Zwirner Gallery and Yale University Press (2018–2019).

== Permanent mural paintings ==
Image (sort by size of the original)	Details (sort by location)	Notes	Date (sort by earliest)
	Café Alberto Mural, acrylic on wall Antwerp, Belgium	This mural was destroyed when Café Alberto closed. It featured a larger version of the painting Superstition (1994).	1995
	Ballroom of the former Ringtheater Mural, acrylic on wall Antwerp, Belgium	In 2007 Tuymans executed a permanent mural based on his painting Bloodstains (1993) on the ceiling of the ballroom of the former Ringtheater. This same year, the building was taken over by Troubleyn/Laboratorium, the performance company run by the Belgian playwright and artist Jan Fabre.	2007
	Concertgebouw Brugge Mural, acrylic on wall Bruges, Belgium	In February 2012, Tuymans used the motif of his painting Angel (1992) for a permanent mural created in the second balcony foyer of the Concertgebouw Brugge.	2012
	Staatsschauspiel Dresden Mural, acrylic on wall Dresden, Germany	Tuymans gave the Staatsschauspiel Dresden two permanent murals created for the main staircases of the building on Theaterstrasse in 2013. These two murals are based on Tuymans' paintings Peaches (2012) and Technicolor (2012).	2013
	Museum of Fine Arts in Ghent Fresco mural Ghent, Belgium	Arena (2017) is the most recent permanent mural created for the Museum of Fine Arts in Ghent. This work is a fresco mural that consists of three panels located at the end of a curved gallery in the museum’s hall.	2017

== Temporary mural paintings ==
Image (sort by size of the original)	Details (sort by location)	Notes	Date (sort by earliest)
	Statiekwartier district in Antwerp near the Central Station Mural, acrylic on wall Antwerp, Belgium	In 1997, Tuymans made four temporary murals for the show Ons Geluk: Luc Tuymans, Danny Devos. The motifs were taken from two paintings and two drawings: Pillows (1997) and J. W. Gacy (1997), Traces (1997), and Missing Persons (1997). This show was staged in the Statiekwartier district in Antwerp near the Central Station. The exhibition space itself was inaccessible, so visitors experienced the installation through a window.	1997
	Fundação de Serralves Mural, acrylic on wall Porto, Portugal	In 1998, Tuymans created three temporary murals based on the works Wandeling (Walk) (1989) and Rotlicht (Red Light) from the triptych Heillicht (Curing Light) (1991), and the painting The Flag (1995) which were incorporated in the exhibition Privacy: Luc Tuymans, Mirosław Bałka at the Fundação de Serralves in Porto in 1998.	1998
	Poëziezomer (Poetry Summer) Watou Mural, acrylic on wall Watou, Belgium	In the summer of 2001, Tuymans contributed two murals to the art and poetry exhibition Poëziezomer (Poetry Summer) in Watou. The first was a temporary mural based on The Heritage IV (1996) executed on floral wallpaper in a private house. The second involved the application of grey paint to the cobbled street and pavement in front of a row of houses, in shapes that mimicked the shadows of their gables.	2001
	Ruimte Morguen Mural, acrylic on wall Antwerp, Belgium	In 2002, Tuymans created four murals based on drawings including Antichambre (1985), Study for Leaf (1986), and Hotel Room (1987). These were created for the group exhibition Kamers which he curated for the twentieth anniversary of Ruimte Morguen in Antwerp.	2002
	Künstlerverein Malkasten in Düsseldorf Mural, acrylic on wall Düsseldorf, Germany	In 2002, Tuymans created four murals based on the paintings Gold (1999), Portrait (2000), and Eyes (2001), and the multipart drawing Missing Persons (1993). These were executed for his solo show Wandmalerei at the Künstlerverein Malkasten in Düsseldorf.	2002
	FRAC Auvergne – Fonds régional d’art contemporain Auvergne in Clermont-Ferrand Mural, acrylic on wall Clermont-Ferrand, France	In June 2003, for the exhibition Curtains, Reconstitution at FRAC Auvergne – Fonds régional d’art contemporain Auvergne in Clermont-Ferrand, Tuymans created five temporary murals which related to the paintings The Rumour (2001), Morning Sun (2003), Navy Seals (2003), Plant (2003), Easter (2006), and three temporary murals that were not based on existing artworks, entitled Eurodisney, Imam, and Supreme Court.	2003
	Witte de With in Rotterdam Mural, acrylic on wall Rotterdam, the Netherlands	Tuymans’ contribution to the group show Monopolis at Witte de With in Rotterdam in 2005 consisted of the temporary mural Twins and the painting Ballroom Dancing (2005).	2005
	Artetage – Museum of Modern Art in Vladivostok Mural, acrylic on wall Vladivostok, Russia	In 2006, Tuymans contributed two temporary murals based on Dracula (2001) and Evidence (2005) to the group show Extremities: Flemish Art in Vladivostok at the Artetage – Museum of Modern Art in Vladivostok.	2006
	Mute Mural, acrylic on wall Antwerp, Belgium	In autumn of 2006, Tuymans co-curated the exhibition Mute in reaction to the political situation in Belgium prior to the 2006 elections. At that time the far-right populist political party Vlaams Belang (the successor to Vlaams Blok, a far-right secessionist political party dissolved in 2004 due to its xenophobic activities) looked set to gain the majority vote in Antwerp and Flanders. The exhibition venue was close to the location where, in May that year, eighteen-year-old Hans Van Themsche shot three people. Tuymans’ contribution to the show was a temporary mural in charcoal that recalled the motif of Heart (1987).	2006
	Kabinett für aktuelle Kunst in Bremerhaven Mural, acrylic on wall Bremerhaven, Germany	In 2007, for his second exhibition Ende (The End) at Kabinett für aktuelle Kunst in Bremerhaven, Tuymans created a site-specific work in the form of an ‘expanded’ mural. Eva Meyer-Hermann described the way Tuymans first painted the floor, walls, and ceiling with grey paint and how on this base, which changed tone depending on the time of day, he then painted geometric shapes in a lighter colour, which corresponded to the changing pattern of light that filtered through the windows. According to her, in art-historical terms, the mural evokes ancient traditions of painting windows and 'played with the concept of an open image that is not fixed in form but subject to change over time'.	2007
	Antwerp (inner-city location) Mural, acrylic on wall Antwerp, Belgium	In spring 2008, the Belgian radio broadcaster Klara initiated an experiment which aimed to discover how many people would notice or recognize a work by an internationally renowned artist outside of a museum. For this experiment, Tuymans painted a temporary mural based on Exhibit #1 (2002) on the facade of a house in an unremarkable inner-city location in Antwerp. The mural could only be seen by the public for a few days, and over forty-eight hour period a hidden camera filmed passers-by. Only four percent of people filmed glanced at the artwork or stopped to look at it.	2008
	Haus der Kunst in Munich Mural, acrylic on wall Munich, Germany	In 2008, the motif of Wonderland was used for a temporary mural created for the exhibition Wenn der Frühling kommt at the Haus der Kunst in Munich, and Church inspired the mural executed for the exhibition Idź i patrz (Come and See) held at Zachęta – National Gallery of Art in Warsaw.	2008
	MCA Museum of Contemporary Art in Chicago Mural, acrylic on wall Chicago, Illinois, United States	In 2010, the painting S. Croce (2005) and two works on paper, S. Croce 1 and S. Croce 2 (both 2010) formed the basis of the temporary mural created for Tuymans’ solo exhibition at MCA Museum of Contemporary Art in Chicago.	2010
	Meštrović Pavilion in Zagreb Mural, acrylic on wall Zagreb, Croatia	In April 2012, for the exhibition Luc Tuymans: Allo!, the prints Plates (2012) inspired the temporary mural he created at the Meštrović Pavilion, a cultural venue and the official seat of the Croatian Association of Artists (HDLU) in Zagreb. In October, Die Nacht was created as part of the site-specific installation project Luc Tuymans: Die Nacht, Ten, Otwock: Season Two in Otwock in Poland. After the opening of the exhibition Constable, Delacroix, Friedrich, Goya at Staatliche Kunstsammlungen. In October, Die Nacht was created as part of the site-specific installation project Luc Tuymans: Die Nacht, Ten, Otwock: Season Two in Otwock in Poland. After the opening of the exhibition Constable, Delacroix, Friedrich, Goya at Staatliche Kunstsammlungen.	2012
	M HKA Museum van Hedendaagse Kunst Antwerpen Mural, acrylic on wall Antwerp, Belgium	In 2014, Tuymans executed two temporary murals, one drawn from Simulation (2007) for the exhibition El Hotel Eléctrico at the M HKA Museum van Hedendaagse Kunst Antwerpen, and one based on Antichambre for the group exhibition De. Fi. Cien. Cy: Andrzej Wróbleswski, René Daniëls, Luc Tuymans at the Art Stations Foundation in Poznań.	2014
	Moscow Biennale of Contemporary Art Mural, acrylic on wall Moscow, Russia	The motif of The Worshipper (2004) was used for a temporary mural created for the 6th Moscow Biennale of Contemporary Art in 2015.	2015
	QM Gallery Al Riwaq in Doha Mural, acrylic on wall Moscow, Russia	For his solo exhibition Intolerance at QM Gallery Al Riwaq in Doha in 2015, Tuymans executed six temporary murals based on Navy Seals (2003), Egypt (2003), Oostende (2003), Demolition (2005), Nuclear Plant (2006), and Silence (1991). The latter was later used for an outdoor mural in Antwerp shown from July 2016 to July 2017.	2015
	Museo Municipal de Arte Moderno in Cuenca Mural, acrylic on wall Cuenca, Ecuador	In 2018, the motif of The Return formed the basis of a temporary mural created for the XIV Bienal de Cuenca, Museo Municipal de Arte Moderno in Cuenca, 2018–19 and Twenty Seventeen inspired a temporary mural created for the Jakarta Biennale.	2018
	Mausoleum of Emperor Ferdinand II nearby the Graz Cathedral Fresco mural Graz, Austria	For the exhibition Last und Inspiration/Burden and Inspiration in 2018, the curator Johannes Rauchenberger invited Tuymans to show his work at a location of his choice in Graz. Tuymans chose an empty room in the crypt of the city’s mausoleum as the site for his second fresco mural, an image of a genetically modified crop, entitled Gene. This fresco was based on the existing artwork Plant (2003).	2018

== Textile murals ==
Image (sort by size of the original)	Details (sort by location)	Notes	Date (sort by earliest)
	Museum Boijmans Van Beuningen in Rotterdam Textile mural Rotterdam, the Netherlands	In 1998, Chris Dercon, the then director of Museum Boijmans Van Beuningen in Rotterdam, invited Tuymans to participate in a project for the Rijksgebouwendienst (the Dutch Government Buildings Agency) with, among others, Jan Dibbets, Marlene Dumas, Ludger Gerdes, Giulio Paolini, and Jeff Wall. The artists were to design textile wall hangings for the courtrooms at the new Paleis van Justitie in ’s-Hertogenbosch. Their drawings were scanned and mechanically produced. The wall hangings were shown at Museum Boijmans Van Beuningen before being permanently installed at the Charles Vandenhove–designed building in the summer of 1998. Tuymans developed concepts for two rooms. The first is a ground floor room which features hangings on three sides based on Recherches (1989) and Illegitimate IV (1997). The second room, on the upper floor, features hangings based on At Random (1994), and Cindy (1996), that cover two opposite walls.	1998
	Town hall in Ridderkerk Textile mural Ridderkerk, the Netherlands	In 2004, Tuymans was invited to design textile wall hangings for the council chamber at the new town hall in the Dutch town of Ridderkerk. Similar to those he created in 1998 for the courtrooms at the Paleis van Justitie in ’s-Hertogenbosch, the monumental wall hangings in Ridderkerk cover three sides of the room. Their designs were inspired by motifs from drawings by the artist and by the silhouettes of the buildings in Ridderkerk.	2004

== See also ==
- List of Belgian painters
- New European Painting
