= Jackie Stacey =

Jackie Stacey is a feminist film theorist. She has contributed to the fields of cultural studies, ethnography, and feminist film theory, particularly in regards to star studies and examining the spectatorial response to film. She is a currently professor of Media and Cultural Studies and the director of the Centre for Interdisciplinary Research in Arts and Languages (CIDRAL) at the University of Manchester. She previously worked in the Department of Sociology at Lancaster University as a professor of women's studies and cultural studies. She has served as co-editor of Screen since 1994. As an author, she has been largely collected by libraries.

== Education ==
Stacey received a Bachelor of Arts degree in European Studies in 1982 from the University of Sussex and a Master of Arts degree in Women's Studies in 1985 from the University of Kent. She received her doctorate in 1992 from the University of Birmingham.

== Theory and thought ==
=== Female spectatorship and Homoerotic Desire ===
In her 1987 article "Desperately Seeking Difference," Stacey posits that there is a very strong connection between lesbian films and films that feature female bonding and friendship. She argues that there is inherently a "homoerotic component" in films about women with intimate friendships, even if there is no explicit homosexual contact between the female characters. Stacey links this argument to her work in spectatorial theory by comparing the homoerotic way in which the female characters on screen interact with one another to the way the female spectators in the audience form a connection with the films' female stars. Stacey suggests that the way female spectators view the stars they see on screen must pertain to some element of desire, as their idealisation of the stars negates the concept of purely narcissistic identification. Rather than viewing the female spectatorial experience through the lens of either male desire or female identification, Stacey calls for a deconstruction of the binary and a more nuanced spectrum with which to explore female spectatorship.

Jackie Stacey's theory of female spectatorship's relation with homoerotic desire has stemmed much academic debate. Opposition to Stacey's theory has been most notably come from Teresa de Lauretis. In contrast to Stacey, de Lauretis, a proponent of orthodox Freudianism, claims that the dichotomy between object libido and the desexualised ego libido that centres on narcissistic identification can not be combined or otherwise dismantled. While Stacey argues for the eroticisation of identification, de Lauretis very staunchly insists that the dichotomy be maintained.

=== The future of women's studies ===
In 1992, along with Hilary Hinds and Ann Phoenix, Jackie Stacey co-edited Working Out: New Directions for Women's Studies, an anthology that attempted to answer the question of where women's studies belonged. Stacey and her co-editors were especially interested in addressing the ambiguities and uncertainties that exist in the field. The title reflects their claim that women's studies is still "working out" how to respond negotiate its marginal standing inside mainstream academia.

In her written and editorial work, Stacey has expressed concern over whether or not women's studies's pursuit of academic legitimacy would diminish open political feminist debate. In regards to selecting texts to form a feminist canon, Stacey has warned that doing so runs the risk of creating a "hierarchy of knowledge" that may exclude the voice of the Other.

== Summary of academic work ==
Stacey is noted for her work in film spectatorship analysis. In her book, Stargazing: Hollywood Cinema and Female Spectatorship (1993), Stacey surveyed the responses women had to the Hollywood starlets of the 1940s and 1950s, such as Doris Day and Rita Hayworth. Through examining letters the respondents sent to her, she examined the spectatorial reaction of the female viewers, an area of inquiry she claims has been much neglected in feminist film theory. With this study's focus on the female spectatorial experience to film and Hollywood mythology, Stacey pushes against the traditional cine-psych mode of analysis (using psychoanalysis as a tool for interpreting the text), a mode of analysis that emphasises meaning as exclusively governed by the text.

Along with Annette Kuhn, Stacey co-edited Screen Histories: A "Screen" Reader (1999), an anthology of essays that address the concept of "history" in screen studies. The essays were originally published in academic journal of film and television studies Screen over the preceding twenty years.

In Global Nature, Global Culture (2000), Stacey, along with Sarah Franklin and Celia Lury, addresses the problematic inherent masculinity of the theory of globalisation. Their argument against this gendered imbalance and their proposition for a field of globalist feminist cultural studies is situated around three case studies. The authors include and analyse cultural images, references, texts, and artworks that are widely distributed to Western audiences, such as The Body Shop, Benetton commercials, and Jurassic Park. While other works in globalisation theory have indeed touched on "how global forces shape and reshape landscapes of culture and nature," few have engaged with it so extensively.

== Selected bibliography ==
=== Books ===
- Stargazing: Hollywood Cinema and Female Spectatorship (1993)
- Teratologies: A Cultural Study of Cancer (1997)
- Gender, Theory and Culture series : Global Nature, Global Culture (2000) (co-authored with Sarah Franklin and Celia Lury)
- The Cinematic Life of the Gene (2010)

=== Anthologies ===
- Working Out: New Directions for Women's Studies (1992) edited by Hilary Hinds, Ann Phoenix, and Jackie Stacey
- Romance Revisited (1995) edited by Lynne Pearce and Jackie Stacey
- Screen Histories: A "Screen" Reader (1999) edited by Jackie Stacey and Annette Kuhn
- Queer Screen: The Queer Reader (2007) edited by Jackie Stacey and Sarah Street

=== Notable critical articles ===
- "Dyketactics for Difficult Times: A Review of the 'Homosexuality, Which Homosexuality?' Conference, Amsterdam, 15–18 December 1987" (1988) (co-written with Sarah Franklin) in Feminist Review
- "Masculinity, Masquerade, and Genetic Impersonation: Gattaca's Queer Visions" (2005) in Signs
- "Crossing over with Tilda Swinton–the Mistress of 'Flat Affect'" (2015) in the International Journal of Politics, Culture, and Society
