= Feminist film theory =

Theoretical film criticism derived from feminist theory and politics

Feminist film theory is a theoretical film criticism derived from feminist politics and feminist theory influenced by second-wave feminism and brought about around the 1970s in the United States. With the advancements in film throughout the years feminist film theory has developed and changed to analyse the current ways of film and also go back to analyse films past. Feminists have many approaches to cinema analysis, regarding the film elements analyzed and their theoretical underpinnings.

== History ==
The development of feminist film theory was influenced by second wave feminism and women's studies in the 1960s and 1970s. Initially, in the United States in the early 1970s, feminist film theory was generally based on sociological theory and focused on the function of female characters in film narratives or genres. Feminist film theory, such as Marjorie Rosen's Popcorn Venus: Women, Movies, and the American Dream (1973) and Molly Haskell's From Reverence to Rape: The Treatment of Women in Movies (1974) analyze the ways in which women are portrayed in film, and how this relates to a broader historical context. Additionally, feminist critiques also examine common stereotypes depicted in film, the extent to which the women were shown as active or passive, and the amount of screen time given to women.

In contrast, film theoreticians in England concerned themselves with critical theory, psychoanalysis, semiotics, and Marxism. Eventually, these ideas gained hold within the American scholarly community in the 1980s. Analysis generally focused on the meaning within a film's text and the way in which the text constructs a viewing subject. It also examined how the process of cinematic production affects how women are represented and reinforces sexism.

British feminist film theorist, Laura Mulvey, best known for her essay, "Visual Pleasure and Narrative Cinema", written in 1973 and published in 1975 in the influential British film theory journal, Screen was influenced by the theories of Sigmund Freud and Jacques Lacan. "Visual Pleasure" is one of the first major essays that helped shift the orientation of film theory towards a psychoanalytic framework. Prior to Mulvey, film theorists such as Jean-Louis Baudry and Christian Metz used psychoanalytic ideas in their theoretical accounts of cinema. Mulvey's contribution, however, initiated the intersection of film theory, psychoanalysis and feminism.

In 1976, the journal Camera Obscura was published by beginning graduate students Janet Bergstrom, Sandy Flitterman, Elisabeth Lyon, and Constance Penley. They discussed how women were portrayed in films, but excluded from the development process. Camera Obscura is still published to this day by Duke University Press and has moved from just film theory to media studies.

Other key influences come from Metz's essay The Imaginary Signifier, "Identification, Mirror," where he argues that viewing film is only possible through scopophilia (pleasure from looking, related to voyeurism), which is best exemplified in silent film. Also, according to Cynthia A. Freeland in "Feminist Frameworks for Horror Films," feminist studies of horror films have focused on psychodynamics where the chief interest is "on viewers' motives and interests in watching horror films".

Beginning in the early 1980s, feminist film theory began to look at film through a more intersectional lens. The film journal Jump Cut published a special issue about titled "Lesbians and Film" in 1981 which examined the lack of lesbian identities in film. Jane Gaines's essay "White Privilege and Looking Relations: Race and Gender in Feminist Film Theory" examined the erasure of black women in cinema by white male filmmakers. While Lola Young argues that filmmakers of all races fail to break away from the use to tired stereotypes when depicting black women. Other theorists who wrote about feminist film theory and race include bell hooks and Michele Wallace.

From 1985 onward the Matrixial theory of artist and psychoanalyst Bracha L. Ettinger revolutionized feminist film theory. Her concept, from her book, The Matrixial Gaze, has established a feminine gaze and has articulated its differences from the phallic gaze and its relation to feminine as well as maternal specificities and potentialities of "coemergence", offering a critique of Sigmund Freud's and Jacques Lacan's psychoanalysis, is extensively used in analysis of films, by female directors, like Chantal Akerman, as well as by male directors, like Pedro Almodovar. The matrixial gaze offers the female the position of a subject, not of an object, of the gaze, while deconstructing the structure of the subject itself, and offers border-time, border-space and a possibility for compassion and witnessing. Ettinger's notions articulate the links between aesthetics, ethics and trauma.

Recently, scholars have expanded their work to include analysis of television and digital media. Additionally, they have begun to explore notions of difference, engaging in dialogue about the differences among women (part of movement away from essentialism in feminist work more generally), the various methodologies and perspectives contained under the umbrella of feminist film theory, and the multiplicity of methods and intended effects that influence the development of films. Scholars are also taking increasingly global perspectives, responding to postcolonialist criticisms of perceived Anglo- and Eurocentrism in the academy more generally. Increased focus has been given to, "disparate feminisms, nationalisms, and media in various locations and across class, racial, and ethnic groups throughout the world". Scholars in recent years have also turned their attention towards women in the silent film industry and their erasure from the history of those films and women's bodies and how they are portrayed in the films. Jane Gaines's Women's Film Pioneer Project (WFPP), a database of women who worked in the silent-era film industry, has been cited as a major achievement in recognizing pioneering women in the field of silent and non-silent film by scholars such as Rachel Schaff.

As of recent years many believe feminist film theory to be a fading area of feminism with the massive amount of coverage currently around media studies and theory. As these areas have grown the framework created in feminist film theory have been adapted to fit into analysing other forms of media.

== Key themes ==
=== The gaze and the female spectator ===
Considering the way that films are put together, many feminist film critics have pointed to what they argue is the "male gaze" that predominates classical Hollywood filmmaking. Budd Boetticher summarizes the view:

"What counts is what the heroine provokes, or rather what she represents. She is the one, or rather the love or fear she inspires in the hero, or else the concern he feels for her, who makes him act the way he does. In herself, the woman has not the slightest importance."

Laura Mulvey expands on this conception to argue that in cinema, women are typically depicted in a passive role that provides visual pleasure through scopophilia, and identification with the on-screen male actor. She asserts: "In their traditional exhibitionist role women are simultaneously looked at and displayed, with their appearance coded for strong visual and erotic impact so that they can be said to connote to-be-looked-at-ness," and as a result contends that in film a woman is the "bearer of meaning, not maker of meaning." Mulvey argues that the psychoanalytic theory of Jacques Lacan is the key to understanding how film creates such a space for female sexual objectification and exploitation through the combination of the patriarchal order of society, and 'looking' in itself as a pleasurable act of scopophilia, as "the cinema satisfies a primordial wish for pleasurable looking."

While Laura Mulvey's paper has a particular place in the feminist film theory, her ideas regarding ways of watching the cinema (from the voyeuristic element to the feelings of identification) are important to some feminist film theorists in terms of defining spectatorship from the psychoanalytical viewpoint.

Mulvey identifies three "looks" or perspectives that occur in film which, she argues, serve to sexually objectify women. The first is the perspective of the male character and how he perceives the female character. The second is the perspective of the spectator as they see the female character on screen. The third "look" joins the first two looks together: it is the male audience member's perspective of the male character in the film. This third perspective allows the male audience to take the female character as his own personal sex object because he can relate himself, through looking, to the male character in the film.

In the paper, Mulvey calls for a destruction of modern film structure as the only way to free women from their sexual objectification in film. She argues for a removal of the voyeurism encoded into film by creating distance between the male spectator and the female character. The only way to do so, Mulvey argues, is by destroying the element of voyeurism and "the invisible guest". Mulvey also asserts that the dominance men embody is only so because women exist, as without a woman for comparison, a man and his supremacy as the controller of visual pleasure are insignificant. For Mulvey, it is the presence of the female that defines the patriarchal order of society as well as the male psychology of thought.

Mulvey's argument is likely influenced by the time period in which she was writing. "Visual Pleasure and Narrative Cinema" was composed during the period of second-wave feminism, which was concerned with achieving equality for women in the workplace, and with exploring the psychological implications of sexual stereotypes. Mulvey calls for an eradication of female sexual objectivity, aligning herself with second-wave feminism. She argues that in order for women to be equally represented in the workplace, women must be portrayed as men are: as lacking sexual objectification.

Mulvey proposes in her notes to the Criterion Collection DVD of Michael Powell's controversial film, Peeping Tom (a film about a homicidal voyeur who films the deaths of his victims), that the cinema spectator's own voyeurism is made shockingly obvious and even more shockingly, the spectator identifies with the perverted protagonist. The inference is that she includes female spectators in that, identifying with the male observer rather than the female object of the gaze.

=== Realism and counter cinema ===
The early work of Marjorie Rosen and Molly Haskell on the representation of women in film was part of a movement to depict women more realistically, both in documentaries and narrative cinema. The growing female presence in the film industry was seen as a positive step toward realizing this goal, by drawing attention to feminist issues and putting forth an alternative, true-to-life view of women. However, Rosen and Haskell argue that these images are still mediated by the same factors as traditional film, such as the "moving camera, composition, editing, lighting, and all varieties of sound." While acknowledging the value in inserting positive representations of women in film, some critics asserted that real change would only come about from reconsidering the role of film in society, often from a semiotic point of view.

Claire Johnston put forth the idea that women's cinema can function as "counter cinema." Through consciousness of the means of production and opposition of sexist ideologies, films made by women have the potential to posit an alternative to traditional Hollywood films. Initially, the attempt to show "real" women was praised, eventually critics such as Eileen McGarry claimed that the "real" women being shown on screen were still just contrived depictions. In reaction to this article, many women filmmakers integrated "alternative forms and experimental techniques" to "encourage audiences to critique the seemingly transparent images on the screen and to question the manipulative techniques of filming and editing".

=== Additional theories ===
B. Ruby Rich argues that feminist film theory should shift to look at films in a broader sense. Rich's essay In the Name of Feminist Film Criticism claims that films by women often receive praise for certain elements, while feminist undertones are ignored. Rich goes on to say that because of this feminist theory needs to focus on how film by women are being received.

Coming from a black feminist perspective, American scholar, bell hooks, put forth the notion of the "oppositional gaze," encouraging black women not to accept stereotypical representations in film, but rather actively critique them. The "oppositional gaze" is a response to Mulvey's visual pleasure and states that just as women do not identify with female characters that are not "real," women of color should respond similarly to the one denominational caricatures of black women. Janet Bergstrom's article "Enunciation and Sexual Difference" (1979) uses Sigmund Freud's ideas of bisexual responses, arguing that women are capable of identifying with male characters and men with women characters, either successively or simultaneously. Miriam Hansen, in "Pleasure, Ambivalence, Identification: Valentino and Female Spectatorship" (1984) put forth the idea that women are also able to view male characters as erotic objects of desire. In "The Master's Dollhouse: Rear Window," Tania Modleski argues that Hitchcock's film, Rear Window, is an example of the power of male gazer and the position of the female as a prisoner of the "master's dollhouse".

Carol Clover, in her popular and influential book, Men, Women, and Chainsaws: Gender in the Modern Horror Film (Princeton University Press, 1992), argues that young male viewers of the Horror Genre (young males being the primary demographic) are quite prepared to identify with the female-in-jeopardy, a key component of the horror narrative, and to identify on an unexpectedly profound level. Clover further argues that the "final girl" in the psychosexual subgenre of exploitation horror invariably triumphs through her own resourcefulness, and is not by any means a passive, or inevitable, victim. Laura Mulvey, in response to these and other criticisms, revisited the topic in "Afterthoughts on 'Visual Pleasure and Narrative Cinema' inspired by Duel in the Sun" (1981). In addressing the heterosexual female spectator, she revised her stance to argue that women can take two possible roles in relation to film: a masochistic identification with the female object of desire that is ultimately self-defeating, or an identification with men as the active viewers of the text. A new version of the gaze was offered in the early 1990s by Bracha Ettinger, who proposed the notion of the "matrixial gaze".

== List of select feminist film theorists and critics ==
- Carol J. Clover
- Pam Cook
- Elizabeth Cowie
- Barbara Creed
- Mary Ann Doane
- Bracha L. Ettinger
- Miriam Hansen
- Molly Haskell
- Maggie Humm
- Dai Jinhua
- Claire Johnston
- E. Ann Kaplan
- Gertrud Koch
- Annette Kuhn
- Teresa de Lauretis
- Tania Modleski
- Laura Mulvey
- Griselda Pollock
- B. Ruby Rich
- Ella Shohat
- Kaja Silverman
- Jackie Stacey
- Gaylyn Studlar
- Linda Williams

== See also ==
- Bechdel test
- Cinesexuality
- Film theory
- List of female film and television directors
- List of lesbian filmmakers
- List of LGBT films directed by women
- Misogyny in horror films
- Women's cinema
- Camera Obscura (journal)
