= The Matrixial Gaze =

1995 book by Bracha L. Ettinger

The Matrixial Gaze is a 1995 book by artist, psychoanalyst, clinical psychologist, writer and painter Bracha L. Ettinger. It is a work of feminist film theory that examines the gaze as described by Jacques Lacan, criticises it, and offers an original theory concerning feminine and female gaze. Beginning in 1985, Ettinger's artistic practice and her theoretical invention of a matrixial space (matricial space) articulated around her proposal of a feminine-maternal sphere of encounter that begins in the most archaic (pre-maternal-prenatal) humanised encounter-event, led her to publish a long series of academic articles starting 1992, articulating and developing for some decades what she has called the matrixial (matricial, matrixiel) theory of trans-subjectivity. The matrixial (matricial, matriciel, matrixiel) theory formulates Aesthetics and artistic creativity in terms of withnessing, compassion, wondering and 'fascinance', as well as Ethics of witnessing, responsibility, respect, compassion and care, and the passage from co-response-ability to responsibility and from com-passion to compassion. Bracha L. Ettinger invented a field of concepts that have influenced debates in contemporary art, psychoanalysis, women's studies, film studies, feminism, gender studies and cultural studies.

== Publication and response ==
Ettinger's work follows the Freudian and Lacanian traditions of psychoanalysis and challenges their phallocentric conceptualizations. Her book also examines Emmanuel Levinas, "Object-relations" theory and Gilles Deleuze/Félix Guattari and also critiques them, reformulating matrixial subjectivity, aesthetics and ethics in light of a feminine difference. Ettinger's book is considered the initiator of the Matrixial Trans-subjectivity theory, or simply "The Matrixial". Her book The Matrixial Borderspace that contains collected papers from the 1990s and includes a reprint of The Matrixial Gaze influenced discussions of subjectivity reviewed as an encounter-event, the matrixial gaze (matricial gaze), matrixial time, matrixial space (matricial space), co-poiesis, borderlinking, borderspacing, co-emergence in differentiating and differentiating, transsubjectivity, transconnectivity, matrixial com-passion, primary compassion, compassionate hospitality, wit(h)nessing, co-fading, severality, matrixial transformational potentiality, matrixial/matricial transference, archaic m/Other, fascinance, encounter-event, besideness, primal Mother-phantasies of Not-enoughness, devouring and abandonment, empathy within compassion, empathy without compassion, the passage from withnessing to witnessing, the passage from response-ability to responsibility, feminine-maternal seduction into life, and metramorphosis. Her conversation with Emmanuel Levinas in 1991, where she proposes that the feminine-matrixial is the source of ethics has become a cornerstone in feminist ethics study.

Scholar Griselda Pollock writes, "The matrixial gaze emerges by a simultaneous reversal of with-in and with-out (and does not represent the eternal inside), by a transgression of borderlinks manifested in the contact with-in/-out and art work by a transcendence of the subject–object interval which is not a fusion, since it is based on a-priori shareability in difference." Scholar Lone Bertelsen has analyzed the claims Ettinger's work makes on behalf of the "feminine", especially the "existential ethic in the feminine". Pat Paxson writes that it approximates the Lacanian gaze, "but from a different angle", adding that it is "pushed by a desire for linking and relationships". Ettinger continued to explore this concept in her published work, including her 2006 book (essays from 1994 to 1999), The Matrixial Borderspace, Matrixial Subjectivity, Aesthetics, Ethics. Vol I: 1990-2000 (2020) and Proto-ética matricial. Film specialist Julian Gutierrez-Albilla systematically analyses Pedro Almodovar's films through different concepts invented by Ettinger in her presentation of the Matrixial gaze and time-space in relation to Ettingerian understanding of trauma, witnessing and healing.

== The matrix and the phallus ==
The matrixial gaze uses the matrix as a symbol to counter Lacan's phallic gaze. Similar to Lacan's formulation, which is a metaphorical reference to anatomy to discuss symbolic masculine power, the matrix is a metaphorical reference to the uterus (matrix - womb) in order to discuss the origins of human ethics and relationality. This shift was "not just to exchange an organ (penis) and its image for another (womb), but to conceive of an alternative to the phallus in terms of structure, mechanism, functions, logic". According to Pollock, Ettinger's matrixial sphere allows us to escape the "notion of the discrete and singular subject formed by the establishment of the boundaries that distinguish it from an oceanic or undifferentiated otherness of the world or the maternal body". Pollock notes that thinking in terms of the phallus and castration anxiety casts subjects in terms of "separations, splits, cuts, and cleavages". Venn adds that the matrix allows the concept of the gaze to extend beyond the visual realm to touch, sound, and movement.
