= Popcorn Venus =

Women, Movies & the American Dream

Popcorn Venus: Women, Movies & the American Dream (Popcorn Venus) is a book written by Marjorie Rosen, published in 1973. Considered one of the first books written by a woman exploring film from a feminist perspective, Rosen's study covers women's roles in movies from the 1900s into the 1960s and early 1970s in the form of reflection theory. Popcorn Venus explores the changing characterization of women in film throughout the decades, with Rosen emphasizing an unrealistic and stereotypical portrayal depending on the social and political climate of the time. Rosen outlines different archetypes of cinematic female characters in her book, from "Vamp(s)" and "Pin-up(s)" to "Spinsters" and "Fatal Women".

== Overview of book contents ==
- Preface
- One: Emerging from Victorianism
  - A Victorian Primer
  - The Moving Pitcha Show Begins
  - Mary's Curls, Griffith's Girls
  - Old Mores for New
- Two: The Twenties- Wet Dreams in a Dry Land
  - Delineating the Flapper
  - Revamping the Vamp
  - The Love Parade Limps Along
- Three: The Thirties- Sacrificial Lambs and the Politics of Fantasy
  - The Whole Town's Talking
  - Gentlemen Prefer Blondes
  - Ah, Sweet Mystery of Womanhood Goes Sour
  - The Landscape of Social Fantasy
- Four: The Forties- Necessity as the Mother of Emancipation
  - The Rise and Fall of Rosie the Riveter
  - Pin the Tail on the Pin-up
  - Suspicion Stalks!
  - Fantastic On-Screen is Fanatic Off
  - The Birth of the Bobby-soxer
- Five: The Fifties- Losing Ground
  - I Do! I Do?
  - Mammary Madness
  - Allredrn Venus
- Six: The Sixties Into Seventies- Revolution & Renaissance?
  - Sing a Song of Single Scenes
  - Flower Children
  - Clinicians of Decadence
  - Changing- Breakthrough or Backlash?
- Epilogue: Feminist Footholds in Filmmaking
- References
- Bibliography
- Index
- Illustrations

== Summary ==
=== Part One: Emerging from Victorianism ===
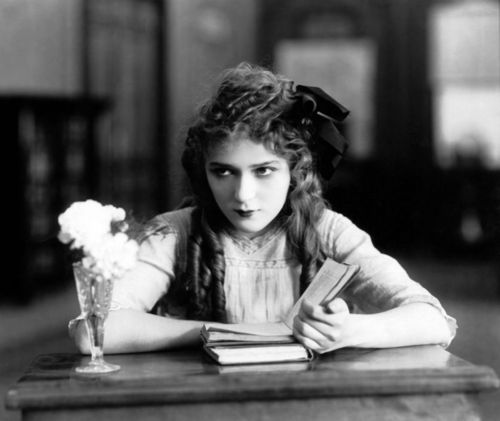
Rosen's example of the Eternal Child, Mary Pickford in the film The Poor Little Rich Girl (1917)

The first part of the book discusses films before and into the early 20th century. Marjorie Rosen notes that Victorian values for women such as domesticity and innocence affected the content of initial films heavily as people were worried about the influential effects films might have.

This part also explains the types of characters who appeared frequently in early films. Female stars of the silent films in this era were said to be typically portrayed as very youthful, innocent, and fun. Rosen writes about actresses such as Mary Pickford, Lillian Gish, and Mae Marsh who are all emblematic of the Eternal Child character who emerged from Victorian morals, the women playing youthful roles well into their 30s. Responsible for their fame was David Wark Griffith, a director at the time who, as Rosen explains, was known for his arsenal of young female stars and his upholding of puritan Victorian morals. Griffith was considered one of the first female-centric directors, yet his portrayal of women on screen was troublesome and infantilizing according to Rosen.

As a contrast to the innocent child character of Pickford, there was Theda Bara's Vamp character who was an overly sexual and evil extreme depiction of women. Both the Eternal Child and Vamp tropes are extreme and unrealistic depictions of women from Rosen's perspective. Rosen notes that there was some exploration of controversial topics such as adultery in films of this time, but these films were cautionary tales in favor of marriage.

=== Part Two: The Twenties- Wet Dreams in a Dry Land ===
Part two explores women in films of the 1920s, a time when women had recently gained the right to vote and slightly more freedom alongside it. Rosen paints a picture of the Flapper with dresses becoming shorter and looser and women beginning to live more independently. While hemlines became higher, Rosen writes that women still were not allowed to act on their sexual desires openly without consequence, and marriage was still the end goal.

This part continues to discuss the Vamp character, who, according to the book, became slightly more developed (such as when played by Pola Negri) and less of a caricature. Leaning more towards the Femme Fatale trope, Rosen explains that film Vamps at the time used their sexuality for power over men. Rosen explains that to avoid breach of censorship rules at the time, sexual Vamp characters often suffered or died in their films as a warning against promiscuous behavior.

Rosen emphasizes the importance of youth and beauty during the time, describing movies as their own form of a pageant. For Rosen, Chorus Girls emulate the beauty ideal- happy, youthful, flirty Flappers. Despite being the object of desire, Rosen notes that Chorus Girls of course still obeyed the moral laws.

Author Eleanor Glyn was discussed in this part as an author of romance novels who also wrote for films. Rosen explains that she wrote a lot about adultery and even showed women in unhappy marriages, but loyalty always prevailed in the end. Then, Rosen discusses Ernst Lubitsch, who wrote a lot of comedies where women could be more sexual, however, she notes that it was played for laughs and so unrealistic that it was unrelatable.

=== Part Three: The Thirties- Sacrificial Lambs and the Politics of Fantasy ===
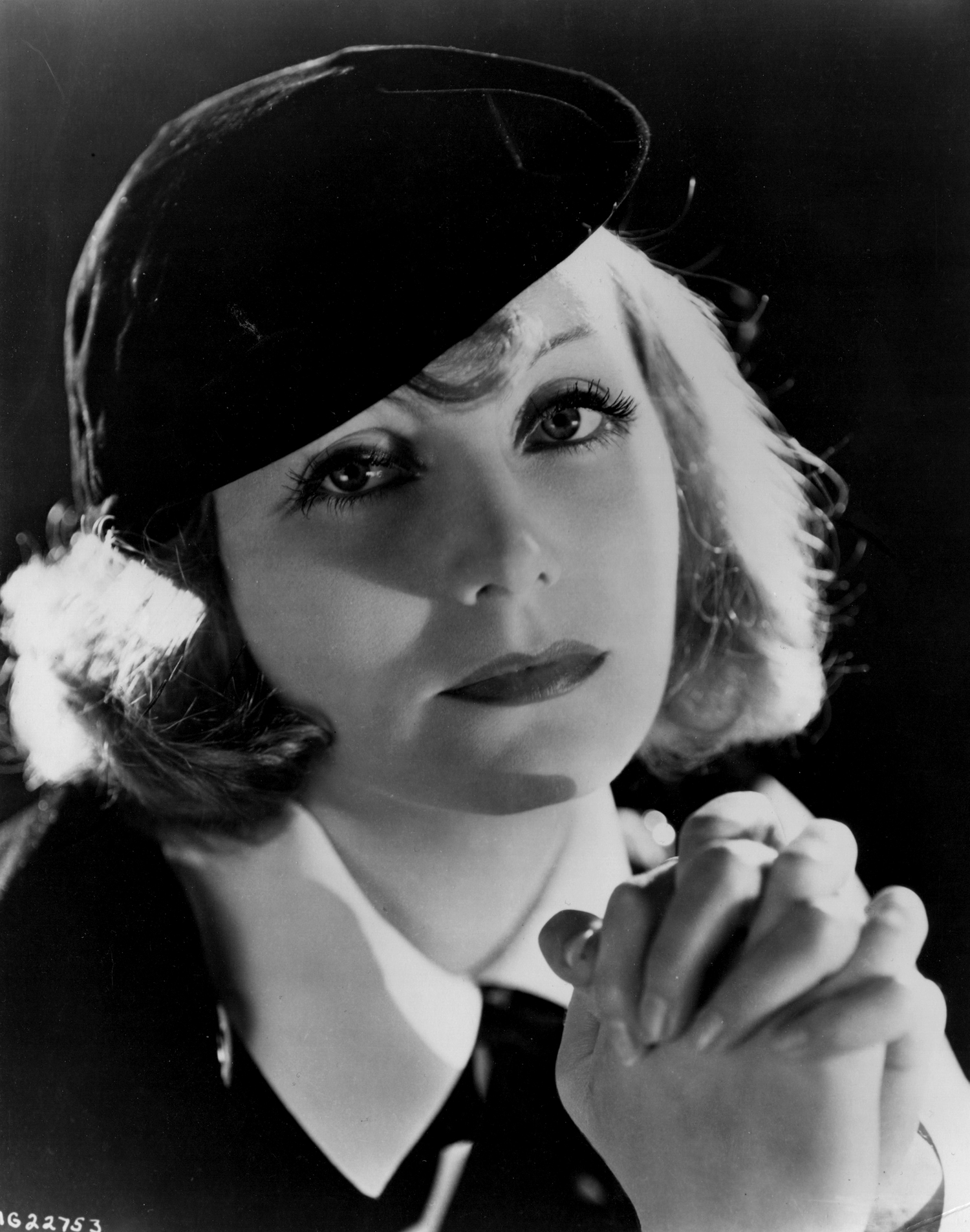
Rosen's example of the Mysterious Woman, Greta Garbo in the film Susan Lennox- Her Rise and Fall (1931)

The third part examines films during The Great Depression in the 1930s. Rosen explains how sound was introduced to films, leading to more realistic characters. She emphasizes a new type of female character, the Mysterious Woman, who was often a journalist or detective, using her wits in the workplace. Rosen finds this ironic because during the depression women were unemployed and even getting fired upon marriage, the Mysterious Woman existed as a form of escapism.

Rosen notes that Greta Garbo was one of the first to portray the Mysterious Woman trope, working alongside the men onscreen and challenging or seducing them. Another actress Rosen refers to is Marlene Dietrich, who was described as more sultry and deadly than Garbo. Dietrich's characters are said in this part to be wanted by every man and always resistant on screen, but then they would give in eventually. For Rosen, this resulted in a fantasy of weaponized sexuality for women, but submission always came so men could still identify with the films. Rosen explains that the feminist movement lost some traction during the depression, so these onscreen women were a fantasy of power.

Another female character trope introduced by Rosen in part three is the Blonde Bombshell, exemplified by actresses such as Mae West and Jean Harlow. The Blonde Bombshell, according to Rosen, represented sex and gold-digging, using sex as an economic power tool.

Rosen says the portrayal of rich women was more frequent during the 30s and that onscreen wealthy women had lots of free leisure time which led to adultery, emphasizing the idea of women's inherently sexual nature. These wealthy women always returned to their husbands, Rosen explains.

For Rosen, child stars in this time play some of the only female characters with true personality and depth. She describes Shirley Temple, whose characters were allowed to be adventurous and play active roles.

=== Part Four: The Forties- Necessity as the Mother of Emancipation ===
Part four explores the cinema women of the 1940s, and films during World War II. Rosen explains this time period by discussing how women took over men's jobs during the war and films became more female-centric as there were fewer male actors. This lack of male actors led to films featuring more complex female characters and stories about women, Rosen describes. Sometimes, according to Rosen, portrayals were overexaggerated and the onscreen women working in men's roles would be comically hyperbolic. Rosen highlights how when men returned from war, women were expected to go back to not having jobs and became side characters in films once again.

A new female character type described by Rosen is the sexualized Pinup woman, played by actresses such as Rita Hayworth and Jane Russel. Their bodies and physical appearance were highlighted in films, according to Rosen.

This part explores the ways women were often portrayed onscreen as psychologically damaged or hysterical. Rosen discusses the framing of women as either evil or victims of violence- the Evil Woman and the Fatal Woman.

As movie stars' lives became more public, Rosen notes that celebrity gossip was popular and celebrities' personal lives were affected. Exemplary of this is Ingrid Bergman, Rosen explaining how her career ended because of the birth of an illegitimate child becoming public.

Rosen also talks about the portrayal of teenage girls in this part. She describes how beauty advertisements focus on them more. Teenagers in films attended school, but Rosen emphasizes that school acted only as a backdrop for women to find husbands and that their education was ignored.

=== Part Five: The Fifties- Losing Ground ===
The fifth part discusses the 1950s post-war era of film. Marriage became really important again and Rosen thinks this is a backward movement in terms of feminism. Women outnumbered men after the war, Rosen explains, so it was more competitive to find a man. Rosen emphasizes that in movies, middle-aged single women were categorized as spinsters who were depicted as pathetic and pitiful cautionary tales. Rosen describes this as the woman alone trope, a place women did not want to be with so much focus on marriage as a happy ending.

Part five describes a shift in focus to sex symbols onscreen, as feminine curvy figures became popular such as Marilyn Monroe. Corsets and girdles were once again marketed to women according to Rosen. Rosen describes Monroe's desire to be a serious actress, but her inability to be taken seriously because of the focus on her figure. Another actress, Brigitte Bardot, knew she was being exploited for her body and was angry about it which Rosen describes as refreshing.

Rosen notes a problem with movie attendance, where movies needed to attract teens again because they were more prone to watch television and loved music like Elvis Presley's. Actors like Natalie Wood and Audrey Hepburn played more youthful, innocent characters with a thrill for life according to Rosen. She describes this type of female character as a Popcorn Venus who teens could identify with more.

=== Part Six: Sixties into Seventies- Revolution and Renaissance ===
The final part of the book explores the 1960s and very early 1970s. Rosen talks about the in-between stage of sex in movies, and how censorship was becoming more lenient as the idea that women might enjoy sex was considered. The period where women were single, but not teens and not spinsters is explored here by Rosen, who emphasized films focus on more independent women who were college-educated. Rosen explains that beauty was still a primary focus, but that films such as Darling explored the idea of women being accepted despite lacking conventional beauty.

Rosen explains the backdrop of the flower child hippy movement, where youth culture preferred avoiding political life and experimenting with drugs. Rosen describes how movies did not represent this new youth culture, as they stuck with the girl next door image instead. She says this resulted in film attendance being lower than in previous years. Rosen says the end of this youth culture came as the youths aged and returned to the conventional life.

Rosen focuses heavily in this part on women's newfound sexual independence and how it led to them being reduced to sex objects in films. She explains that sex became clinical in films, as it lacked romance and intimacy. Women were sexually objectified whereas men were not as much, Rosen notes. She details how female gay sex was shown onscreen but male gay sex was not shown. Similar patterns emerged with onscreen sexual assault according to Rosen, as sexual violence was frequent for women in films but edited out when it was inflicted on men. For Rosen, the sexual revolution of this time depicts a male fantasy in films rather than female-centric explorations of sex.

== Feminist Impact ==
Popcorn Venus is known for its historical exploration of women's changing stereotypical roles in American films, determined by the assumed patriarchal structure of Hollywood. Rosen's second-wave feminist analysis in Popcorn Venus is heavily influenced by the works of Simone de Beauvoir, such as her book The Second Sex, which is referenced throughout Popcorn Venus. The patriarchal categorization of women in films outlined by Rosen is said to promote an unrealistic and false idea of women which plays into male desires.

Feminist criticisms of Popcorn Venus complain that Rosen does not offer enough basis in social theory to support her claims and that she does not touch enough on the roles of Black women in films.

Despite criticism, Rosen's early work is considered an important and contextually comprehensive early feminist film theory contribution.

== Reception ==
Popcorn Venus is generally applauded for its style but critiqued for its lack of theoretical depth. Marilyn Mitchell concludes in her 1974 review that Popcorn Venus "entertains" but "only occasionally enlightens", commending Rosen's style of writing but criticizing her lack of support for claims. Claire Johnston writes in her 1975 review that Rosen's book suffers from "amateurism and subjective response". E. Ann Kaplan writes positively of Rosen's wit and in-depth descriptions in Popcorn Venus but also critiques that "her insights remain underdeveloped".

== Miscellaneous ==
Morrissey, the lead singer of British rock band The Smiths, credits the book as inspiration for the title of their seminal track "How Soon Is Now?" (1984) – known for its distinctive tremolo guitar riff, melancholic lyrics, and themes of loneliness and yearning for connection, it is often cited as a classic.
