= Christine Buci-Glucksmann =

French philosopher

Christine Buci-Glucksmann

Christine Buci-Glucksmann (née Christiane Pierrette Andrée Lecocq) (December 9, 1936 – September 28, 2026) was a French philosopher and Professor Emeritus from University of Paris VIII specializing in the aesthetics of the Baroque, of Japan, of digital art and of virtuality. She cited Gilles Deleuze and Jean-François Lyotard as being most influential in guiding her research into aesthetics. Her best-known works are La Folie du voir : Une esthétique du virtuel (1986), Esthétique de l'éphémère (2003), Baroque Reason: The Aesthetics of Modernity (1994) and The Madness of Vision: On Baroque Aesthetics (2013) which integrated the work of Maurice Merleau-Ponty, Jacques Lacan's psychoanalysis, Renaissance optics and twentieth-century mathematics. She died aged 90 on September 28, 2026 in Paris and is buried at the Cimetière de Gentilly in the 13th arrondissement of Paris.

== Background ==
The daughter of Lucien-Pierre Lecocq, a self-taught proofreader of Oriental languages, Buci-Glucksmann attended the École Normale Supérieure of Fontenay (class of 1957), Buci-Glucksmann passed the agrégation in philosophy and taught preparatory classes for the École Normale Supérieure at the Lycée Lakanal in Sceaux. She married the philosopher André Glucksmann in 1958; and they divorced in 1974. She joined the French Communist Party in 1965 and was editor of a collection of Fidel Castro's speeches in 1966. She also was a member of the editorial board of the monthly La Nouvelle Critique.

Christine Buci-Glucksmann began her career as a philosopher in the 1970s with studies of Friedrich Engels and Antonio Gramsci. Subsequently, she turned her attention in the 1980s to the philosophy of perception and aesthetics, particularly through the work of Walter Benjamin, as well as to Baroque art and literature, producing the texts La Raison baroque (1984) and La folie du voir – une esthétique du virtuel (1986). This research led her to posit a link between the Baroque and postmodernism: a connection reflecting the dual influence of Gilles Deleuze and Jean-François Lyotard.

Her interest in literature and painting was complemented by an interest in cinema, and she devoted a book to the filmmaker Raoul Ruiz, examining his work through the lens of Baroque aesthetics.

Later she investigated the aesthetics of the virtual with two books: La folie du voir: Une esthétique du virtuel and Esthetique De L'ephemere. She has written numerous books and articles about digital art (for example L'art à l'époque virtuel (Art in the Age of Virtuality)) and new media art. She has also written extensively on artists from China, for in example in Les modernités chinoises.

In her late works, Buci-Glucksmann focused on the concept of melancholy, revisiting Walter Benjamin's writings on the subject, specifically his The Origin of German Tragic Drama.

== Bibliography ==
=== Books ===
In translation:

- Baroque Reason: The Aesthetics of Modernity (translated by Patrick Camiller). London / Thousand Oaks, Calif., Sage, 1994. ISBN 0-8039-8976-8
- Gramsci and the State (translated by David Fernbach). London, Lawrence and Wishart, 1980. ISBN 0-85315-483-X
- The Madness of Vision: On Baroque Aesthetics (translated by Dorothy Z. Baker). Athens, Ohio, Ohio University Press, 2013. ISBN 9780821444375

In French:

- L'art à l'époque virtuel, Arts 8, L'Harmattan, 2004
- Esthetique de l'éphemère, Galilée, 2003, ISBN 2-7186-0622-3
- La folie du voir: Une esthétique du virtuel, Galilée, 2002
- Histoire Florale De La Peinture: Hommage à Steve Dawson, Galilée, 2002, ISBN 2-7186-0594-4
- L'esthétique du Temps au Japon: Du Zen au Rituel, Galilée, 2000, ISBN 2-7186-0555-3
- Peinture, Trois Regards (Christine Buci-Glucksmann, Eric De Chassey, Catherine Perret), Ėditions du Regard, 2000, ISBN 2-84105-122-6
- Les Frontières Esthétiques de l'Art, L'Harmattan, 1999, ISBN 2-7384-8262-7
- L'Oeil Cartographique de L'art, Galilée, 1996, ISBN 2-7186-0467-0
- L'enjeu du Beau: Musique et Passion, Galilée, 1992, ISBN 2-7186-0405-0
- Tragique de l'Ombre: Shakespeare et le Maniérisme, Galilée, 1990, ISBN 2-7186-0352-6
- (with Fabrice Revault d'Allonnes) Raoul Ruiz, Dis Voir, 1987, ISBN 2-906571-02-4
- Imaginaires de L'autre: Khatibi et la Mémoire Littéraire, L'Harmattan, 1987, ISBN 2-85802-783-8
- La Folie du Voir: De L'esthétique Baroque, Galilée, 1986, ISBN 2-7186-0306-2
- La Raison Baroque: De Baudelaire à Benjamin, Galilée, 1984, ISBN 2-7186-0269-4
- Ouverture d'une Discussion: Dix Interventions à La Rencontre des 400 Intellectuels à Vitry, F. Maspero, 1978, ISBN 2-7071-1084-1
- Gramsci et l'Ėtat: Pour Une Théorie Materialiste de la Philosophie, Fayard, 1975, ISBN 2-213-00151-0

=== Essays ===
- "Eurydice et les scènes de la peinture." Verso No. 8 (1997).
- "The Eurydices." Parallax Parallax No.10 (1999).
- "Images d'absence." Les Cahiers des Regards (1993).
- "Images of Absence in the Inner Space of Painting," in Inside the Visible. Ed. C. De Zegher. (MIT Press, 1996).
- "Inner Space of Painting," in Bracha L. Ettinger: Halala—Autistwork. (The Israel Museum, 1995).
- "L'oeil nomade et critique," in L'oeil cartographique de l'art. (Galilée, 1996).
