= The Cinema Book =

Film studies textbook edited by Pam Cook

- Editor: Pam Cook
- Language: English
- Genre: Non-fiction
- Publisher: British Film Institute
- Publication date: 1985
- Publication place: United Kingdom

The Cinema Book is a film studies textbook edited by Pam Cook and first published by the British Film Institute (BFI) in 1985 as a resource for teachers. The first edition was based on the BFI Education Department's collection of film clips for use as study guides. However, at the time there were few film textbooks, and The Cinema Book was an unexpected success. Over the next decade it was adopted by many film studies courses around the world and translated into several languages.

By the time of the second edition in 1999, co-edited with Mieke Bernink, the film clip collection was deemed redundant, and the book was transformed into an in-depth guide to film history and updated to include recent theoretical developments. A third revised edition appeared in 2007.

The Cinema Book was one of the last books to be published by BFI Publishing as an integral part of the British Film Institute. Amid some controversy, the institute entered into a partnership deal with global publishers Palgrave Macmillan and BFI Publishing staff were relocated to Macmillan's offices in London's King's Cross in January 2008.
