= Cinesexuality =

Cinesexuality is a concept in film philosophy by feminist film theorist Patricia MacCormack which attempts to explain why people sometimes feel an intense attraction towards film.

== Origins ==
MacCormack coined the term and used it as the title of her 2008 essay to describe her philosophical speculation about film, which is similar in some respects to the poststructuralist philosophy of desire by contemporary philosophers Gilles Deleuze and Félix Guattari.

== Meaning ==
While the term is somewhat vague, she uses it to describe why there is a "desire which flows through all who want cinema as a lover," why film can feel erotic, whether such intense feelings may be explained by a psychic model of "tension and release," and why there is this "physical pleasure of cinema" which sometimes manifests itself in an "erotic and subversive" way.

== Analysis ==
Catherine Grant suggested that MacCormack has essentially reformulated the term cinephilia, a term in film criticism which denotes passionate interest in film.

Two reviewers suggest that MacCormack explores the "inherent queerness of film," in the sense that the relation between spectators and a film is "inherently queer." According to reviewer Jill Crammond Wickham in Poets Quarterly, cinesexuality can explain not only why film audiences feel such a strong desire for what they see on screen, but why "our culture is so obsessed with movie stars."

== Examples of cinesexuality ==
- Hellraiser II (1988)
- Alien (1979)
- The films of Mario Bava
- Flesh for Frankenstein (1974)
- Suspiria (1977)
- Dimensions of Dialogue (1982)
- Bollywood cinema

== See also ==
- Sex in film
- Feminist film theory
- 2008 in film
