= New European Painting =

Artistic movement

New European Painting emerged in the 1980s and reached a critical point of major distinction and influence in the 1990s with painters like Gerhard Richter, Sigmar Polke, Georg Baselitz, Anselm Kiefer and Bracha L. Ettinger whose paintings have established and continue to create a new dialogue between the historical archive, American Abstraction and figuration. The major new European painters of this era show strong engagements with painful personal and general history, as well as shared history; its memory and its oblivion; and with life under the shadow of World War II, utilizing research in new and old materials, photography and oil painting.

== Development ==
These were followed by painters like Luc Tuymans, Marlene Dumas and Miriam Cahn. A third wave came with artists like Neo Rauch, Michaël Borremans and Chris Ofili. Neo-expressionism and other related movements in painting have emerged in the final two decades of the 20th century in Europe and in the United States, but this New Painting is not expressionist. Rather it is a renovative kind of abstraction and figuration that relates to the parallel practice of a turning into art of personal and historical photographic archives.

== Concerns ==
New European Painting relates to the post-traumatic traces of war and it involves working oil painting and drawings with new media like photography, xerox and digital media to create and develop a postmodern archive "fever". This painting relates through this aspect to the post-World War II "archive" art with artists like Christian Boltanski and Jochen Gerz, and it is often a part of this tendency. Yet, though this painting has a clear figurative stroke it is strongly connected to Lyrical Abstraction to contemporary reconsiderations of the Sublime in art while creating a new inner space in painting and in the series of paintings.

== Bibliography ==
- Hans-Ulrich Obrist, Laurence Bosse and Carolyne Christove-Bakargiev, La Ville, le Jardin, la Memoire / City, Garden, Memory. Villa Medici, Rome, 1999.
- Michael Ann Holley and Keith Moxey, Art History, Aesthetics, Visual Studies. Clarck Art Institute, Studley Press 2002.
- Chris Dercon, Face a l'Histoire / In Front of History. Pompidou Centre, Paris, 1996.
- Griselda Pollock, Encounters in the Virtual Feminist Museum: Time, Space and the Archive. Routledge, 2007.
- Patrick Le Nouene and Jochen Gerz, Gerz: L'oeuvres sur papier photographique 1983-86. Musee des Beaux-Arts de Calais, 1986.

== See also ==
- Neo-expressionism
- Lyrical Abstraction
- Postmodern art
- Late Modernism
- Modernism
- Digital painting
- Intermedia
