= Emma Kunz =

Swiss healer and artist

- Kunz c. 1920
- Born: Emma Kunz; 23 May 1892; Brittnau, Switzerland
- Died: 16 January 1963 (aged 70); Waldstatt, Switzerland
- Movement: Abstractism
- Memorials: Emma Kunz Center (Waldstatt)
- Website: emma-kunz.com

Emma Kunz, also nicknamed Penta (Swiss Standard German: [ˈɛmə kʊnts]; 23 May 1892 - 16 January 1963), was a Swiss healer, researcher, artist, and author. She published three books on poetry, telepathy and prophetry and geometrical drawings. The Emma Kunz Center in Waldstatt, Switzerland houses her collections.

== Early life ==
Kunz was born 23 May 1892 in Brittnau, Switzerland to Stephan Oswald Kunz, a destitute hand weaver, and Rosina Kunz (née Gubelmann). Three of her siblings died during childhood. When she was 17 years old, her brother and father committed suicide.

== Career ==
Kunz was not a trained artist; she is characterized as an outsider artist. Inspired by spiritual evolution, she divined with a pendulum and created her drawings by radiesthesia. Kunz did not intend for her images to be seen in a fine arts context; none of her works were titled or dated. Kunz instead recorded the medical meanings of her works in books.

In 1938, Kunz began creating large scale drawings on graph paper with pencil, colored pencil and oil pastels. She considered her drawings to be holograms that could be experienced multidimensionally.

In 1942 in Würenlos, Kunz discovered a rock in a Roman quarry that she called "AION A," and attributed it with healing and therapeutic properties.

Kunz produced a substantial body of work of 400 drawings. The first exhibition of Kunz's work was in the early 1970s, posthumously.

== Legacy ==
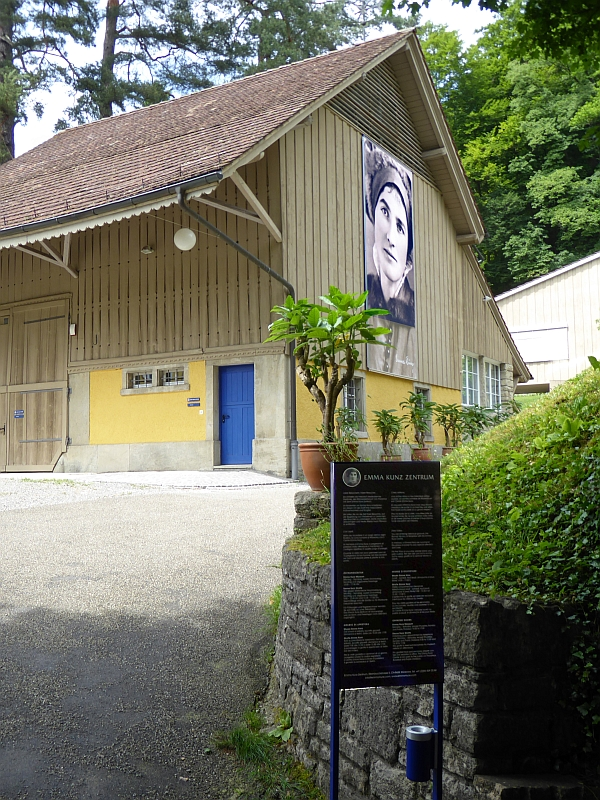
The Emma Kunz Zentrum, Würenlos.

Art historian Catherine de Zegher, in comparing Kunz to other women artists, wrote: "Hilma af Klint, Agnes Martin, and Emma Kunz approached geometric abstraction not as formalism, but as a means of structuring philosophical, scientific, and spiritual ideas. Using line, geometry, and the grid, each of these artists created diagrammatic drawings of their exploration of complex belief systems and restorative practices."

The Emma Kunz Centre was founded in 1986 by Anton C. Meier, a relative of Kunz's, to preserve Kunz's research findings and art. The Emma Kunz Museum opened in 1991.

== Exhibitions ==
- Der Fall von Emma Kunz (The Case of Emma Kunz), 1973
- 3 x Abstraction: New Methods of Drawing by Hilma af Klint, Emma Kunz, and Agnes Martin, Santa Monica Museum of Art (2005). ISBN 9780300108262.
- 55th Venice Biennale, 'The Encyclopedic Palace' Central Pavilion curated by Massimiliano Gioni
- Emma Kunz: Visionary Drawings, Serpentine Galleries, 2019
- Emma Kunz Cosmos - A Visionary in Dialogue with Contemporary Art, Aargauer Kunsthaus, 2021

== Publications ==
- Leben (Life) (1930) - Poetry by Emma Kunz
- The Miracle of Creative Revelation (1953, self-published) - by Emma Kunz
- New Methods of Drawing (1953, self-published) - by Emma Kunz
- Emma Kunz (1976) - by Heini & Harald Szeemann & Thomas Ring. Widmer
- Emma Kunz 1892-1963. Forscherin, Naturheilpraktikerin, Künstlerin (1994) - by Anton C. Meier
- Emma Kunz. Artist, Researcher, Healer (1998)
- 3 x An Abstraction: New Methods of Drawing by Hilma Af Klint, Emma Kunz and Agnes Martin (2005) - by Catherine De Zegher
- World Receivers: Georgiana Houghton - Hilma af Klint - Emma Kunz (2019)
- Zahl, Rhythmus, Wandlung : Emma Kunz und Gegenwartskunst (2020) - by Régine Bonnefoit
- Emma Kunz A Visionary in Dialogue With Contemporary Art (2021) - Edited by Yasmin Afschar
