= Claire Johnston (film theorist) =

British feminist film theoretician (1940–1987)

Claire Johnston (1940–1987) was a feminist film theoretician. She wrote seminal essays on the construction of ideology in mainstream cinema (Hollywood and European auteur cinema).

== Writings ==
- "Women's Cinema as Counter-Cinema" (1973) in: Claire Johnston (ed.), Notes on Women's Cinema, London: Society for Education in Film and Television, reprinted in: Sue Thornham (ed.), Feminist Film Theory. A Reader, Edinburgh University Press 1999, pp. 31–40
- "Feminist Politics and Film History", Screen 16, 3, pp. 115–125
- (Editor), The work of Dorothy Arzner: Towards a Feminist Cinema, London: British Film Institute, 1975

== See also ==
- Feminist film theory
