= Craigie Horsfield =

Craigie Horsfield (born 1949 in Cambridge) is an English artist. In 1996 he was nominated for the annual Turner Prize.

Horsfield described his work (photographs of the environments and people around him) as, "intimate in scale but its ambition is, uncomfortable as I find it, towards an epic dimension, to describe the history of our century, and the centuries beyond, the seething extent of the human condition." He often prints the photographs many years after they were first taken, bringing into contrast memory and the present reality.

His work was shown in Documenta XI, Kassel in 2002 and the Whitney Biennial in 2003.

He lives and works in London and New York.

== See also ==
- Turner Prize
