= Marjorie Rosen =

American author, journalist, screenwriter

Marjorie Rosen is an American author, journalist, screenwriter, and professor best known for her 1973 book Popcorn Venus: Women, Movies and the American Dream. Rosen currently teaches Journalism at Lehman College in New York.

== Career ==
Holding both a Bachelor's and Master's degree from the University of Michigan and New York University respectively, Rosen has worked for a multitude of companies as a journalist including The Los Angeles Times, Glamour, and Film Comment as well as many others.

Rosen has written four books throughout her career, the first being her most well-known feminist film work Popcorn Venus (1971), followed by a mystery novel titled What Nigel Knew (1981) which was written under the alias Evan Field. Rosen's next book is Mia & Woody: Love and Betrayal (1994), which was written about Mia Farrow and Woody Allen's relationship, with the help of Mia Farrow's past nanny, Kristi Groteké. Marjorie Rosen's most recent book is Boom Town: How Wal-Mart Transformed an All-American Town into an International Community (2009), which examines Walmart's influence on a small town in Arkansas.

Rosen has also worked as a screenwriter on projects such as The Alfred G. Graebner Handbook of Rules and Regulations with CBC, and First the Egg with ABC. Additionally, she worked as a screenwriter on an Emmy award-winning special for ABC, Read Between the Lines: Starring the Harlem Globetrotters.

For her screenwriting, Rosen has earned two fellowships throughout her career.

Now, Rosen is a professor of Journalism at Lehman College.

== Role in Feminist Film Theory ==
Marjorie Rosen's novel Popcorn Venus: Women, Movies & the American Dream is one of the first feminist film theory books. In Rosen's own words, Popcorn Venus is the "first major retrospective on women in films". The book is comprehensive coverage of films from the early to later 20th century, focusing primarily on women's problematic characterization on-screen. Despite some criticism of Rosen's lack of emphasis on diverse women in film, Rosen laid much of the groundwork for feminist film analysis with her book.
