= Sarah Franklin =

American anthropologist

- Born: November 9, 1960 (age 65); Cambridge, Massachusetts, U.S.
- Education: New York University (MA); Smith College (BA); University of Birmingham (PhD); University of Kent (MA)
- Scientific career
- Fields: Anthropology; Cultural theory; Gender studies; Feminism
- Workplaces: London School of Economics; Lancaster University; University of Manchester; University of Cambridge
- Website: www.christs.cam.ac.uk/content/professor-sarah-franklin; www.lse.ac.uk/sociology/whoswho/academic/franklin.aspx; sarahfranklin.com

Sarah Franklin (born 1960) is an American anthropologist who has substantially contributed to the fields of feminism, gender studies, cultural studies and the social study of reproductive and genetic technology. She has conducted fieldwork on IVF, cloning, embryology and stem cell research. Her work combines both ethnographic methods and kinship theory, with more recent approaches from science studies, gender studies and cultural studies. In 2001 she was appointed to a Personal Chair in the Anthropology of Science, the first of its kind in the UK, and a field she has helped to create. She became Professor of Social Studies of Biomedicine in the Department of Sociology at the London School of Economics in 2004. In 2011 she was elected to the Professorship of Sociology at the University of Cambridge.

== Education ==
Franklin is a graduate of Smith College (1982) from which she received a Distinguished Alumnae Award in 2011. She has an MA in Women's Studies from the University of Kent (1984), an MA in Anthropology from New York University (1986) and a PhD from the University of Birmingham's Centre for Contemporary Cultural Studies (1992). She is one of the first anthropologists to undertake ethnographic research on new reproductive technologies.

== Research ==
She has written and edited numerous books on reproductive and genetic technologies, as well as more than 150 articles, chapters, and reports. She has designed and led several major research projects addressing the social and cultural dimensions of new reproductive and genetic technologies with funding from the Wenner Gren Foundation for Anthropological Research, The Wellcome Trust, the Leverhulme Trust, the European Commission, the Economic and Social Research Council (UK) the British Academy, the Philomathia Foundation, and the Medical Research Council (UK). In 2010 she was elected as a Fellow of the Society of Biology.

On 12 October 2017 she became a Fellow of the Academy of Social Sciences, while in 2021 she was elected a Fellow of the British Academy.

== Selected publications ==
- Biological Relatives: IVF, stem cells and the future of kinship, Duke University Press, 2013.
- Dolly Mixtures: the remaking of genealogy, Duke University Press, 2007.
- Born and Made: an ethnography of preimplantation genetic diagnosis, (co-authored with Celia Roberts), Princeton University Press, 2006.
- Remaking Life and Death: towards an anthropology of the biosciences, (co-edited with Margaret Lock), SAR Press, 2003
- Relative Values: reconfiguring kinship studies, Duke 2001 (co-edited with Susan McKinnon).
- Global Nature, Global Culture, (co-authored with Celia Lury and Jackie Stacey), Sage, 2000.
- Reproducing Reproduction: Kinship, Power and Technological Innovation, (co-edited with Helena Ragone), UPenn Press, 1998
- Embodied Progress: a cultural account of assisted conception, Routledge, 1997.
- The Sociology of Gender, Edward Elgar, 1996.
- Technologies of Procreation: kinship in the age of assisted conception, (co-authored with Jeanette Edwards, Eric Hirsch, Frances Price and Marilyn Strathern), Manchester University Press, 1993. Second Edition, Routledge, 1999.
- Off-Centre: feminism and cultural studies, (co-edited with Celia Lury and Jackie Stacey), Harper Collins, 1991.
