= Daniel Drache =

Canadian political scientist

Daniel Drache is a scholar in Canadian and international political economy, globalization studies, communication studies, and cultural studies. He is recognized as having made important contributions to comparative and interdisciplinary debates on policy, globalization, border security, and the impact of new information and communication technologies on political mobilization and citizenship. He is also known for his critique of market fundamentalism. In Canada he is also credited with reviving the work of foundational political economist Harold Innis within the academy. Drache is a professor emeritus political science and senior research scholar of the Robarts Centre for Canadian Studies at York University in Toronto, Canada.

== Biography ==
Drache previously directed the Robarts Centre for Canadian Studies, a York University research center from 1994 to 2003. At York, Prof. Drache was appointed to graduate programs in Political Science, Communication and Culture, and Environmental Studies, where he supervised numerous graduate students.

Drache is also frequent lecturer and visiting scholar. For example, in 2003–04 he was a senior resident of Massey College at the University of Toronto, and in 2009, he was the Distinguished Shastri-Indo Canadian Institute Visiting Professor, lecturing at universities in New Delhi, Indore, Mumbai, Bangalore, and Chennai. Drache returned to India from August to December 2010 as a Ford Foundation visiting professor at the Centre for the Study of Law and Governance at Jawaharlal Nehru University in New Delhi, where he served as their resident visiting scholar on WTO, trade, and global governance issues. Recently, Drache has been a visiting scholar at Wuhan University, Beihang University, and Fudan University in China.

Born in Toronto in 1941, Drache earned his BA in political science from the University of Toronto in 1963, and his MA in the same field from Queen's University in 1971. He is a rare example of someone who had a successful academic career without ever acquiring a PhD. Following work as a social movement activist, he was appointed to York University as an assistant professor of political science in 1974. Four years later, he was tenured and promoted to the rank of associate professor. From 1988 to 1991, he served as chair of Atkinson Political Science at York, and in 1993, he attained the rank of full professor.

== Research and publications ==
Prof. Drache's diverse research constitutes a critical body of interdisciplinary work reflecting his expertise in international political economy. Since 1995, he has edited Routledge’s book series, Studies in Governance and Change in a Global Era, which includes texts on topics such as the impact of globalization, international development, the environment, markets, new citizenship practices, global public health, and information and communication technologies. Some of Drache’s writings have been translated into Spanish, French, and Portuguese, as the select bibliography below attests. Additionally, he has received grants from the Social Sciences and Humanities Research Council of Canada (SSHRC), the Canadian Department of Foreign Affairs and International Trade (DFAIT), the Canadian International Development Agency (CIDA), and York University in support of his work.

=== Markets and globalization ===
Drache’s 1996 book, States Against Market (co-edited with Robert Boyer of Le Centre national de la recherche scientifique in Paris), is regarded by experts as one of the first texts of globalization studies to reassess empirically as well as analytically market fundamentalism. It challenges the assumption that globalization was equally beneficial to all countries, a position that was used by some economists to reduce the role of the nation-state as a regulator of markets from what it had been under Keynesianism.

In 1995, Drache co-authored (with Harry Glasbeek) The Changing Workplace, an interdisciplinary analysis of the impact of new technology on work and employment. Their book is an examination of the restructuring of the workplace and the new and complex challenges it poses for organized and non-organized labour.

Additionally, Drache's monograph, Borders Matter: Homeland Security and the Search for North America (Fernwood Press: 2004), is a study of the effects of post-9/11 US security measures on the management of the Canada-US border. Within, Drache argues that the Canada-US border has become more intrusive or "thicker" post-9/11, and that the seamless border of NAFTA is now a thing of the past. Paradoxically, the border has become more important for Canadians, a country founded on immigration and modern notions of citizenship. Effectively, it has become a priority to protect Canada's national identity at a time of heightened US security concerns.

In a related work, The Market or the Public Domain: Global Governance and the Asymmetries of Power (2001), Drache analyzes the reconstitution of the public domain as a sphere of public policy both contested by the market and championed by new citizen practices. He focuses especially on the prospect of an international order requiring governance in the post-Washington Consensus environment, which values institution building rather than the self-regulating market. Overall, the disjunction between the economic side of globalization and its social impact has gradually broken-down, and the public domain has become the public space to defend society from powerful market actors and renew the public interest.

In 2014, Drache co-edited Linking Global Trade and Human Rights: New Policy Space in Hard Economic Times with York University Law Professor Lesley A. Jacobs, which examined the major reconfigurations of social and economic policy spaces for national governments on the international landscape during the hard economic times that follow global financial crises. Recently, Drache and Jacobs have co-edited a follow up volume entitled Grey Zones in International Economic Law and Global Governance Crises and Resilience, from the University of British Columbia Press, 2018.

=== New technologies and the public sphere ===
The latest of Drache’s published books, Defiant Publics: The Unprecedented Reach of the Global Citizen (Polity Press: 2008), focuses on how information technologies transfer power to the user and, as a result, have extended and deepened the global public sphere in new and unanticipated ways.

Grounded primarily in the work of Habermas and Innis, this text challenges the deterministic assumption of the Frankfurt School that information-based technologies are captured by powerful elites for their own corporate uses. Instead, Drache argues from the Innisian perspective that "Web 2.0" and the Internet have transferred power downwards, enabling discursive social networking across the globe to a greater degree.

Because of the number of users who are now online, Drache attributes the rise of micro-activism and user empowerment as a direct result of these activist discursive networks. This text uses political theory framed around "old media" broadcast models to illuminate the potential of new media in an internet age. As a specific case study, Drache offers a theoretical framework to understand Barack Obama’s victory in the 2008 US Presidential Election by leveraging social media networks.

=== Harold Innis and Canadian political economy ===
A political scientist by training, Drache is mainly recognized for his foundational work in Canadian political economy, specifically in the fields of resource capitalism and Harold Innis's Staples thesis of capitalist development. According to noted political economist Mel Watkins, he is partially credited with the revival of political economy as a field of study and research within Canadian political science, particularly after it had fallen out of fashion in 1974.

Notably, Prof. Drache published The New Era of Global Competition (McGill-Queen’s University Press: 1991), a study of state policy and market power and the new phenomenon of globalization. It also identifies alternative routes for Canadian industry under pressure from global competition. As this text was published before globalization was as widely recognized and examined as it is today (it was written prior to the publication of the field's first seminal text, Hirst & Thompson's Globalization in Question from 1996), it can be regarded as one of the first major Canadian analytical examinations of the impact of global capitalism on states and markets.

Drache also edited a new collection of Innis’ own work, published by McGill-Queen’s in 1995 as Staples, Markets and Cultural Change: the Centenary Edition of Harold Innis’ Collected Essays. Drache’s volume presents Innis’ scholarship on political economy, economic geography, communications theory to the public as an integrated whole, and re-introduces his work to a new generation of scholars within the emerging context of globalization.

== Select bibliography ==
Books or book chapters (written or edited):

Drache, D. and Lesley A. Jacobs, Crises and Resilience in International Economic Law: Global Governance and Policy Spaces, Vancouver: University of British Columbia Press, forthcoming.

Drache, D. and Lesley A. Jacobs, Linking Global Trade and Human Rights: New Policy Space in Hard Economic Times. Cambridge, UK: Cambridge University Press, 2014.

Defiant Publics: The Unprecedented Reach of the Global Citizen. (Polity Press, 2008).

Big Picture Realities: Canada and Mexico at the Crossroads, Daniel Drache, ed. (Wilfrid Laurier University Press, 2008).

La Ilusión Continental: Seguridad fronteriza y la búsqueda de una identidad Norteamericana. Translation with new introduction and material. (Siglo XXI, 2007).

L’Illusion continentale: Securité et nord-américanité. (Montreal: Athéna éditions, 2006).

Borders Matter: Homeland Security and the Search for North America. (Fernwood Publishing, 2004).

The Market or the Public Domain: Global Governance and the Asymmetry of Power, Daniel Drache, ed. (Routledge, 2001).

Health Reform: Public Success, Private Failure, Daniel Drache and Terry Sullivan, eds. (Routledge, 1999).

States Against Markets: The Limits of Globalization, Daniel Drache and Robert Boyer, eds. (Routledge, 1996).

Warm Heart, Cold Country: Fiscal and Social Policy Reform in Canada, Daniel Drache and Andrew Ranachan, eds. (Caledon Institute, 1995).

Staples, Markets and Cultural Change: The Centenary Edition of Harold Innis’ Collected Essays, Daniel Drache, ed. (McGill-Queen’s University Press, 1995).

Canada and the Global Economy. (University of Athabasca, 1994).

The Changing Workplace: Reshaping Canada’s Industrial Relations System, Daniel Drache and Harry Glasbeek. (James Lorimer, 1992).

Getting On Track: Social Democratic Strategies for Ontario, Daniel Drache and John O’Grady, eds. (McGill-Queen’s, 1992).

Negotiating with a Sovereign Quebec, Daniel Drache and R. Perin, eds. (James Lorimer, 1992).

The New Era of Global Competition: State Policy and Market Power, Daniel Drache and Meric Gertler, eds. (McGill-Queen’s, 1991).

Politique et Régulation Modele de Développement et Trajectoire Canadienne, Daniel Drache et Gérard Boismenu. (Méridien/L’Harmattan, 1990).

The Other Macdonald Report The Consensus on Canada's Future That The Macdonald Commission Left Out, Daniel Drache and Duncan Cameron, eds. (James Lorimer, 1985).

The New Practical Guide to Canadian Political Economy, Daniel Drache and Wallace Clement, eds. (James Lorimer, 1985).

"Debates and Controversies", from the pages of This Magazine, Daniel Drache, ed. (Toronto, 1979).

A Practical Guide to Canadian Political Economy, Daniel Drache and Wallace Clement, eds. (James Lorimer, 1978).

Quebec. Only the Beginning. (New Press, 1972).
