= Paul Hirst =

British sociologist and political theorist

- Born: Paul Quentin Hirst; 20 May 1946; Holbeton, England
- Died: 17 June 2003 (aged 57); London, England

Academic background
- Education: University of Leicester; University of Sussex
- Academic advisor: Thomas Bottomore
- Influences: Louis Althusser; John Neville Figgis; Michel Foucault

Academic work
- Discipline: Political science; sociology
- Sub-discipline: Political theory; social theory
- School or tradition: Associationalism; pluralism; structural Marxism (early)
- Institutions: Birkbeck College, London
- Influenced: Keith Jenkins

Paul Quentin Hirst (Note: Pronounced /hɜːrst/.) (20 May 1946 – 17 June 2003) was a British sociologist and political theorist. He became Professor of Social Theory at Birkbeck College, London, in 1985 and held the post until his death from a stroke and brain haemorrhage.

== Biography ==
Hirst was born in Holbeton, Devon. His father was in the armed forces and part of his childhood was spent in Germany. He went to grammar school in Plymouth, studied social science at the University of Leicester, where he was taught by Sami Zubaida, and took his master's in sociology at the University of Sussex.

Hirst took up a lectureship at Birkbeck College in 1969. In 1972, he was one of the founding members of the Department of Politics and Sociology at Birkbeck. He was appointed Reader in Social Theory in 1978 and Professor seven years later.

During the 1970s he became well known (along with Barry Hindess) as the main figure in British structural Marxism. By the late 1970s and 1980s, however, Hirst had become a critic of Louis Althusser's brand of Marxism. Drawing upon Michel Foucault but also W. V. O. Quine and Ludwig Wittgenstein, he criticised essentialism, epistemological discourses and the possibility of any general theory, in a move against careless sociological constructionist imperialism. In his work on democratic governance, he turned towards the ideas of the English political pluralists: John Neville Figgis, G. D. H. Cole, and Harold Laski. During the late 1980s and early 1990s, Hirst developed a theory of associationalism which attempted to revive social democracy by providing an alternative to state socialism and free-market liberalism. He also made important contributions to critical legal theory.

His later work, with Grahame Thompson resulted in an influential criticism of fashionable theories of economic globalisation, demonstrating the continued importance of the nation-state. His book 'War and Power' is a historical-sociological analysis of the development of the modern state and state system and addresses some of current political challenges including climate change. His last book 'Space and Power' clearly demonstrated his intellectual scope. In the book he investigates the relationship between space and power, arguing that the exercise of power is both constrained by and shapes the character of the built environment.

With Mark Cousins, Colin MacCabe, and Richard Humphreys, he founded the London Consortium in 1993. He chaired the executive committee of Charter 88 and was an early and regular contributor to openDemocracy.

He died on 17 June 2003 in London.

== Selected bibliography ==
- Hirst, P. and Hindess, B. Pre-Capitalist Modes of Production. London: Routledge & Kegan Paul, 1975.
- Hirst, P. On Law and Ideology. London: MacMillan, 1979.
- Hirst, P. and Woolley, P. Social Relations and Human Attributes. London: Routledge, 1982.
- Hirst, P. Law, Socialism and Democracy. London: HarperCollins, 1986.
- Hirst, P. “Carl Schmitt's Decisionism”. Telos 72 (Summer 1987). New York: Telos Press.
- Hirst, P. Representative Democracy and its Limits. Cambridge: Polity, 1990.
- Hirst, P. Associative Democracy. Cambridge: Polity, 1993.
- Hirst, P. From Statism to Pluralism. London: UCL Press, 1997.
- Hirst, P. and Thompson, G. Globalisation in Question. Cambridge: Polity, 1999.
- Hirst, P. War and Power in the 21st Century. Cambridge: Polity, 2001.
- Hirst, P. Space and Power: Politics, War and Architecture. Cambridge: Polity, 2005.

=== Journals ===
- "Statism, Pluralism and Social Control", The British Journal of Criminology, Volume 40, Issue 2, (1 March 2000), pp 279–295
