= London Consortium =

Former graduate school in United Kingdom

The London Consortium
- Active: 1993–2012
- Affiliations: Birkbeck, University of London
- Chair: Anthony Julius
- Students: 125 (2011/12 total)
- Location: London, United Kingdom
- Campus: Urban
- Director: Paul Hirst, 1993–2002, Steven Connor 2002–2012

From 1993 to 2012, The London Consortium was a graduate school in the UK offering multidisciplinary Masters and Doctoral programs in the humanities and cultural studies at the University of London. It was administered by Birkbeck, University of London, one of the constituent colleges of the University of London, and fell under the Humanities list of courses at Birkbeck.

The London Consortium was a collaborative program composed of Birkbeck, the Architectural Association, Institute of Contemporary Arts, the Science Museum and the Tate Gallery. As of 2013, The London Consortium exists solely as a legacy partnership between the constituent institutions for the benefit of the remaining PhD students until the completion of their dissertations.

== History ==
The Consortium was founded in 1993 by the late social philosopher Paul Hirst (1947-2003), Mark Cousins, Richard Humphreys, and Colin MacCabe. Until 1999, the British Film Institute was part of the Consortium. After the BFI (British Film Institute) removed its involvement (due to policy changes and external pressures at that institution), it was replaced by the Institute of Contemporary Arts. In 2007, the Science Museum joined the collaboration, with its Head of Research, Peter Morris, contributing as a core faculty member.

== Faculty ==
The Consortium's permanent and adjunct faculty included figures such as the psychoanalytic theorist Parveen Adams, cultural theorist Steven Connor, architectural theorist and philosopher Mark Cousins, Tate curators Marko Daniel and Richard Humphreys, film theorist and producer Colin MacCabe, philosopher John Sellars, artist and writer Tom McCarthy, and film theorist Laura Mulvey. Past supervisors and visiting faculty have included cultural theorist Stuart Hall, psychoanalytic theorist Juliet Mitchell, writer Marina Warner, and psychoanalytic philosopher Slavoj Žižek. Its chairman was the lawyer and writer Anthony Julius.

== Academic programmes ==
The Consortium offered courses taught by faculty from across all five constituent institutions, including professors from Birkbeck and the Architectural Association, curators from the Tate and the Institute of Contemporary Arts, as well as external faculty drawn from various institutions in London and across the UK. Classes were taught in venues at Birkbeck, the Tate Modern and Tate Britain, the Institute of Contemporary Arts, and the Science Museum.

=== Masters ===
==== MRes Humanities and Cultural Studies ====
The Master of Research programme was available only as a one-year full-time course. It was a unique and challenging post-graduate introduction to theories, methods and knowledges in the humanities and cultural studies. Students combined coursework and research throughout, culminating in the production of a dissertation. The Master of Research was taken as a stand-alone degree in its own right, and also acted as a pathway into the Consortium PhD programme.

==== MA in Film Curating ====
The MA in Film Curating, which was offered for two years beginning in October 2010, was a collaboration between the London Consortium and the London Film School. Bringing together recent thinking about curating contemporary art with the constantly evolving world of film, film festivals, and the movie business, it offered a theoretical exploration into the role of film curating in an age in which digital distribution technologies have transformed both the traditional notion of curating and the commercial film distribution sector. Students also gained practical experience in curating, within the context of existing film festivals like Cannes and Rotterdam, both of which were visited, and through the practical curation of film or film/related events.

=== Doctoral ===
==== PhD Humanities and Cultural Studies ====
The Consortium PhD included a taught component. First year PhD students followed the same core courses as those studying towards the MRes, courses designed to give a grounding in multidisciplinary research. Previous core courses included 'Catastrophe', 'St. Paul', 'Godard's Contempt: Text and Pretext', 'Shit and Civilization', 'Metamorphosis', and 'Whiteness'. Through courses like these, the Consortium could be thought of as developing an original conception of Cultural Studies. While the Centre for Contemporary Cultural Studies at Birmingham University—founded by Richard Hoggart and for a long time the institutional home of Stuart Hall—conceived of Cultural Studies as the study of contemporary popular culture, the London Consortium has sought to develop a research and teaching climate where the study of older historical periods, on the one hand, and of 'high' culture on the other, can take its place alongside the more traditional foci of the discipline. This also entails a different approach to interdisciplinarity. Where interdisciplinary studies had often been content to merely ignore the traditional academic disciplines, and run roughshod over disciplinary boundaries, the London Consortium preferred to describe its activities as multidisciplinary, reflecting the belief that while the best research benefited from being approached from two or more disciplinary perspectives, it must also stand up to the most exacting standards of the disciplines.

== Notable alumni ==
- Thomas Altheimer, British artist
- Katie Kitamura, American novelist
- Brandon LaBelle, Sound Artist
- Markus Miessen, Architect, Theorist
- Richard Mosse, Photographer
- Aaron Schuman, photographer, writer, curator and educator
- Lee Scrivner, American novelist and cultural historian
- Shain Shapiro, Founder of music cities consultancy Sound Diplomacy.
- Christopher Turner, Editor of Icon Magazine
- Eyal Weizman, Architect, Director of Research Architecture, Goldsmiths College, University of London

== Bibliography ==
- Critical Quarterly 42, no. 2 (Summer 2000), special issue of Critical Quarterly on the London Consortium, Blackwell Publishers
- ICA page on the London Consortium
- Birkbeck College Academic Quality Assurance document for the London Consortium graduate programs
- Article by Mark Cousins on Paul Hirst and the London Consortium
- Article on the early years of The London Consortium
