= Colin MacCabe =

English academic, writer and film producer

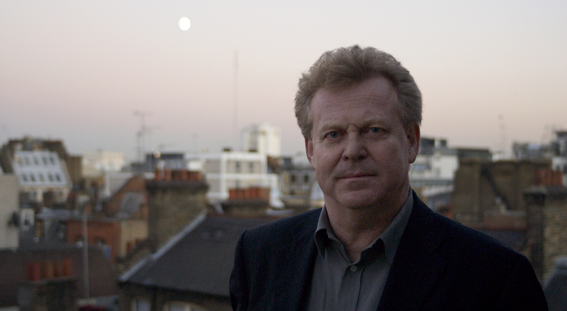
- MacCabe in Soho, London (January 2007)
- Born: 9 February 1949 (age 77); Essex, England
- Education: Trinity College, Cambridge
- Occupations: Academic, literary critic, film scholar, author, film producer
- Employer: University of Pittsburgh
- Known for: Work on James Joyce, literary criticism, film studies, cinema

Colin Myles Joseph MacCabe (born 9 February 1949) is an English academic, literary critic, film scholar, author, and film producer. He is currently a distinguished professor of English and film at the University of Pittsburgh. He has contributed on the Irish novelist James Joyce, including the books “'James Joyce and the Revolution of the Word'' and ''A Very Short Introduction to James Joyce''. He has also worked with the British Film Institute and the London Consortium.

== Early life and education ==
MacCabe attended St. Benedict's School in Ealing, London, from 1956 to 1966. He studied at Trinity College, Cambridge from 1967 to 1971.

From 1971 to 1974, MacCabe was a research student and Senior Scholar at Trinity College, Cambridge.

He subsequently became a Research Fellow at Emmanuel College, Cambridge, from 1974 to 1976. He completed his Ph.D. at the University of Cambridge in 1976. His doctoral thesis was titled ''James Joyce and the Revolution of the Word: an examination of James Joyce's practice of writing and its consequences for literary criticism''.

== Career ==
Maccabe as a graduate student attended the Ecole Normale Superieure in Paris (1972–73), following courses by Louis Althusser, Etienne Balibar, Roland Barthes and Jacques Derrida. In 1974 he was elected a research fellow at Emmanuel College, Cambridge, where he remained from 1976 until 1981 as a university assistant lecturer in the history of Modern and Early Modern English in relation to literature, and also became a teaching fellow of King's College, Cambridge.

=== University of Strathclyde ===
From 1981 to 1985, MacCabe was Professor of English at the University of Strathclyde. His work during this period continued to engage with literary theory and criticism while also expanding into questions concerning language, culture, and popular forms of representation.

=== British Film Institute ===
MacCabe joined the British Film Institute (BFI), where he held senior positions in film research and production. He served as Head of Production from 1985 to 1989 and Head of Research from 1989 to 1998.

=== University of Pittsburg ===
When MacCabe secured a contract at the BFI in 1985 he negotiated an unpaid leave of 3 months so that he could teach one semester each year at the University of Pittsburgh where he had been appointed to a Full Professorship. In 2001 Pittsburgh asked him to become the director of the Pitt in London program and, as part of his duties, to teach one semester a year in London. From then until his retirement in 2025 MacCabe was a full-time employee of the University of Pittsburgh who made him a Distinguished Professor in 2002.

=== University of Exeter ===
In 1998 MacCabe was appointed Professor of English at the University of Exeter. He also founded with Paula Jalfon, Minerva Pictures which produced documentaries for the New York based Independent Film Channel. At Exeter, MacCabe wrote books drawing on his experience of production: Performance (London BFI 1998) and Jean-Luc Godard: A Portrait of the Artist at 70 (Farrar, Strauss and Giroux 2004).

=== Birkbeck, University of London and London Consortium ===
MacCabe was Professor of English and Humanities at Birkbeck, University of London from 2006 to 2010. From 2006 to 2013, he served as Associate Director of the London Consortium, an interdisciplinary postgraduate program associated with Birkbeck.

His work with the London Consortium reflected his continuing interests in literature, film, cultural studies, and interdisciplinary research.

=== Film production ===
Alongside his academic career, MacCabe has worked as a film producer and executive producer. From 1998 to 2008, he was a producer with Minerva Pictures.

His film-related work has included collaborations with directors such as Jean-Luc Godard, Terence Davies, Isaac Julien, Derek Jarman and Peter Wollen. His production credits include ''Derek'' (2008), directed by Isaac Julien; ''Murder by Numbers'' (2004), directed by Mike Hodges and Paul Carlin; and ''Melancholia'' (1989), directed by Andi Engel.

=== SEFT ===
MacCabe became involved in Screen, a journal of film theory published by SEFT (Society for Education in Film and Television) becoming a member of its board in 1973–78 and contributing essays such as "Realism and Cinema: Notes on Some Brechtian Theses" (1974). This was a period that critic Robin Wood described as the "felt moment of Screen" – the time when critical theories emanating from Paris in the late 1960s began to intervene in Anglophone film culture. By releasing the energy and intellectual debate associated with a major paradigm shift, Screen posed a "formidable and sustained challenge to traditional aesthetics" and academia.

== Writing and academic interests ==
MacCabe has published widely on film and literature with particular emphasis on James Joyce, Jean-Luc Godard, and topics in the history and theory of language. He has served as chairman of the London Consortium, which he co-founded with Mark Cousins, Paul Hirst, and Richard Humphreys. He has edited Critical Quarterly.

Funded by the AHRC, the Colonial Film Project 2007-2010 was co-directed with Lee Grieveson. Following Raymond Williams's pioneering work in the 1980s on a historically founded etymology – Keywords: A Vocabulary of Culture and Society, which began in 2005 will be completed in 2017.
