= Mark Cousins (writer) =

British architect (1947–2020)

Mark Cousins (8 October 1947 – 26 September 2020) was a British cultural critic and architectural theorist. He studied Art History at Merton College, Oxford and was a research student at the Warburg Institute. From 1993 he was the director of general studies and head of the graduate programme in histories and theories at the Architectural Association. He was also visiting professor of architecture at Columbia University and at Southeast University in Nanjing, China.

He co-founded the London Consortium along with Paul Hirst, Colin MacCabe, and Richard Humphreys.

Cousins was the author of Michel Foucault, co-written with Athar Hussain (London: Macmillan, 1984); The Ugly, a series of articles published in AA Files (1995, 1996); the Introduction to the Penguin Edition of The Unconscious by Sigmund Freud (London: Penguin:2005). Cousins gave the Friday Lectures at the Architectural Association for more than thirty years.

== Selected articles ==
- "The Logic of Deconstruction". Oxford Literary Review, vol. 3, no. 2, 1978, pp. 70–77. ISSN 0305-1498
- "In the Midst of Psychoanalysis", New Formations 7, Spring 1989, pp. 77–87.
- "The Ugly", AA Files, 28, Autumn 1994, pp. 61–64. ISBN 978-1-907896-23-1
- "The Ugly", AA Files, 29, Summer 1995, pp. 3–6. ISBN 978-1-907896-23-1
- "The Ugly", AA Files, 30, Autumn 1995, pp. 65–68. ISBN 978-1-907896-23-1
- "Lo feo", Analysart, 17. Caracas: Instituto de Estudios Avanzados, 1999 (Spanish translation of "The Ugly").
- "The Insistence of the Image: Hitchcock's Vertigo", in Adams, Parveen (ed.), Art: Sublimation or Symptom. London: Karnac Books. 2003, pp. 3–26. ISBN 978-1855759145
- Introduction, The Unconscious by Sigmund Freud. London: Penguin Modern Classics, 2005. ISBN 978-0141183886.
- "Technology and Prosthesis", Hurly-Burly, Issue 5, March 2011, pp. 191–199. ISSN 2101-0307
- "La Arquitectura y sus Pasados", RevistArquis 2, Universidad de Costa Rica, 2012 (Spanish translation). ISSN 2215-275X
- "Paul Hirst and The London Consortium", openDemocracy, 15 July 2003.
