= Scrivner =

Scrivner is a surname. Notable people with the surname include:

- Errett P. Scrivner (1898–1978), American politician
- Lee Scrivner (born 1971), American writer and cultural theorist
