= Social equality =

Equality for all people within society

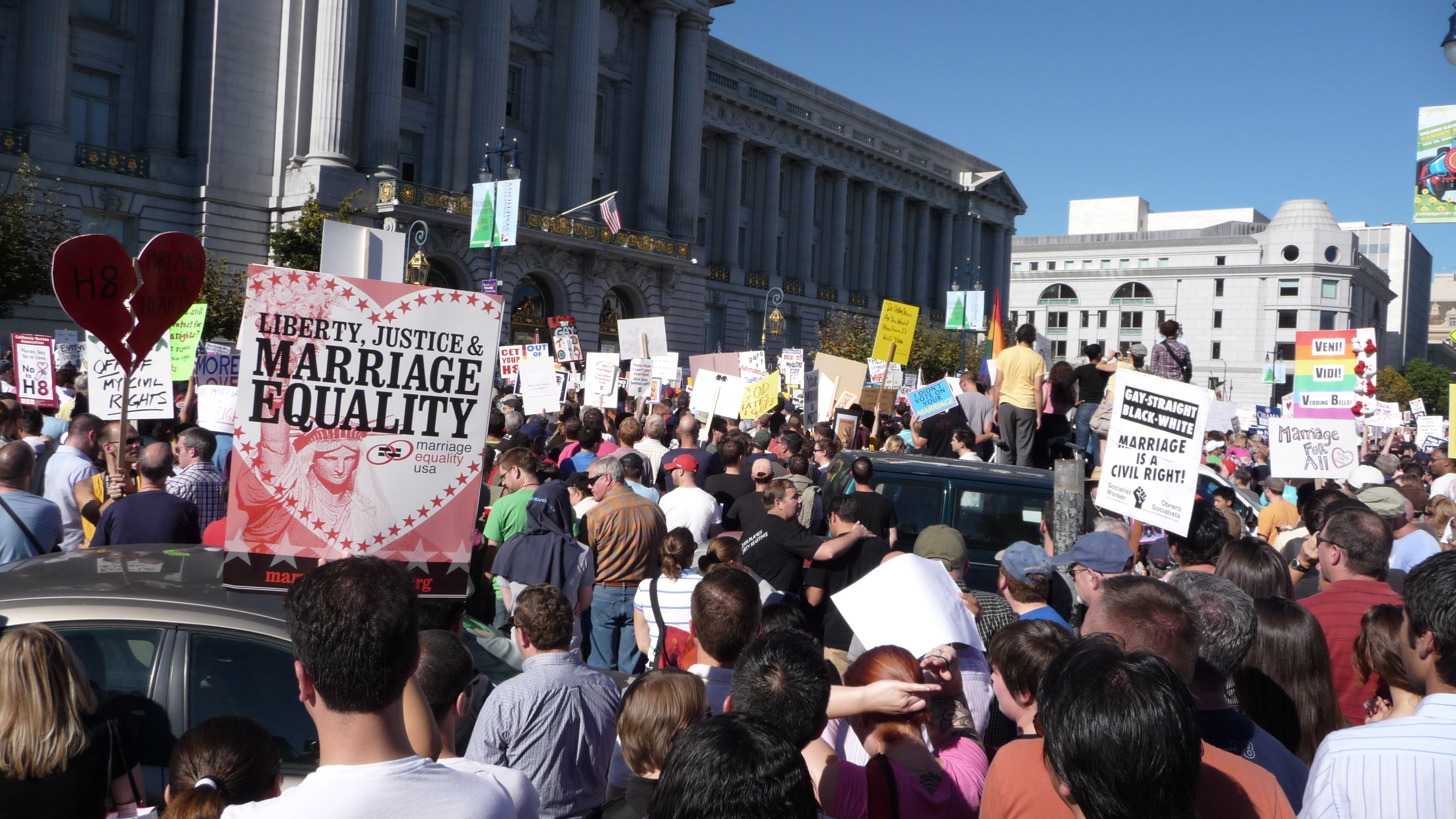
A pro-marriage equality rally in San Francisco, US

Equality symbol ⊜

Social equality is a state of affairs in which all individuals within society have equal rights, liberties, and status; possibly including civil rights, freedom of expression, autonomy, and equal access to certain public goods and social services.

Social equality requires the absence of legally enforced social class or caste boundaries, along with an absence of discrimination motivated by an inalienable part of an individual's identity. Advocates of social equality believe in equality before the law for all individuals regardless of many aspects. These aspects include but are not limited to, sex, gender, ethnicity, age, sexual orientation, origin, caste or class, income or property, language, religion, convictions, opinions, health, disability, trade union membership, political views, parental status, mores, family or marital status, and any other grounds. These are some different types of social equality:

- Formal equality: equal opportunity for individuals based on merit.
- Substantive equality: equality of outcomes for groups, also called social equity.

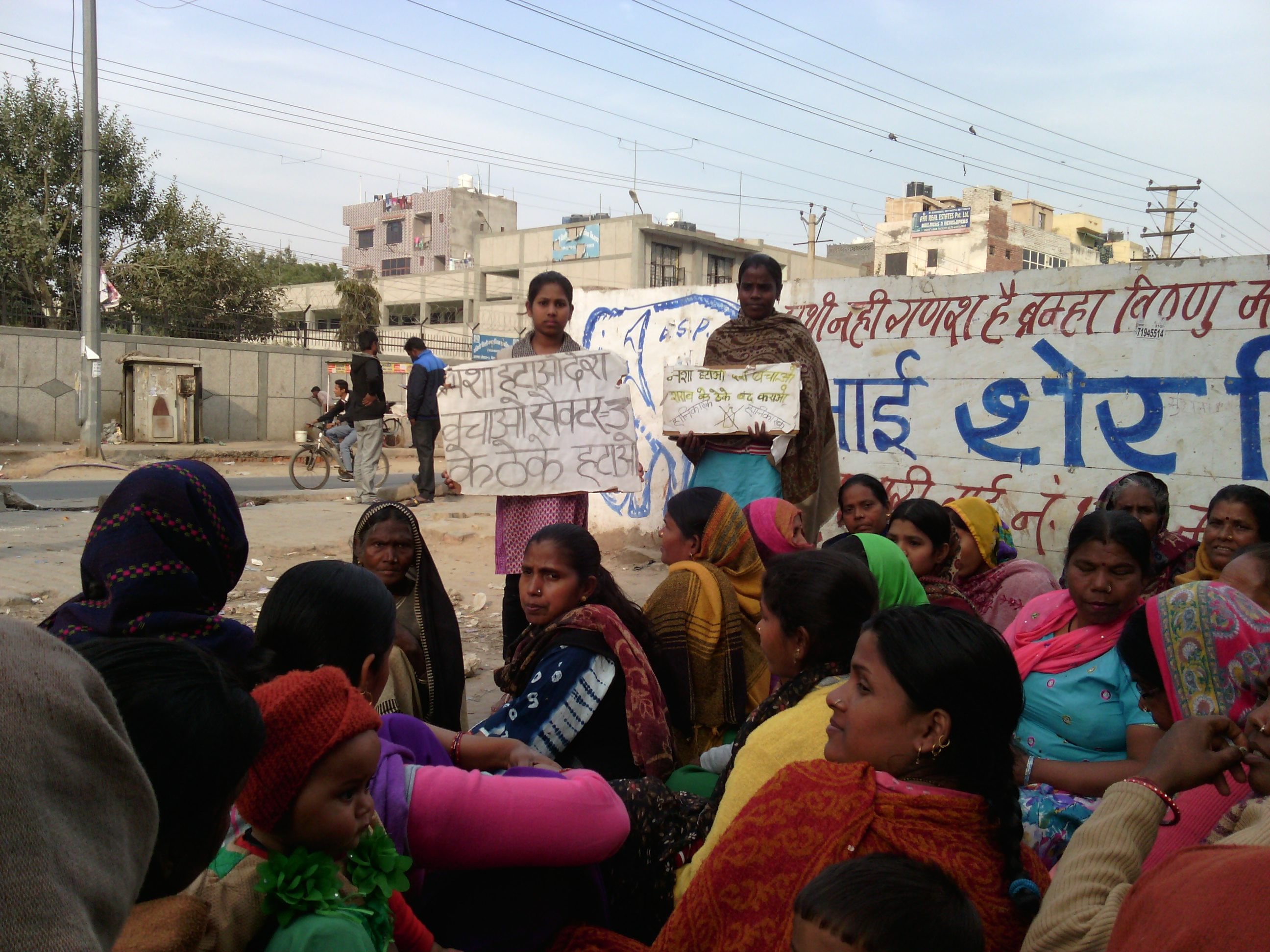
Women in Dwarka, New Delhi, line up in protest to get a local liquor shop moved to a different location, away from a school.

== Definition ==
Social equality is variously defined and measured by different schools of thought. These include equality of power, rights, goods, opportunities, capabilities, or some combination of these things. It may also be defined in comparison to distributive equality, power structures between individuals, or justice and political egalitarianism. Societies that promote social equality generally do not make distinctions of rank or social class. In addition to this, interpersonal relationships that exist within a system of social equality are generally based on the idea of mutual respect and equal value rather than hierarchy or honour. Many different ideologies draw from ideas of social equality, including communism, anarchism, multiculturalism, republicanism, democracy, socialism, and social democracy. The advocacy of social equality is egalitarianism. Social equality is distinct from alleviating suffering of the unfortunate in society. It is an expression of the ideal that any two individuals in society should be treated with equal respect and have an equal right to participate in society without regard for social status or hierarchy.

Social equality often pertains to how individuals relate to one another within a society, though it can also be considered in interactions between societies. Social hierarchies may form between states or their citizens when power disparities exist between them, particularly in the context of globalization. These disparities are often distinct in type as well as scope, as citizens in different states do not share a common community or social environment. As advances are made in social equality, both internationally and within a society, the scope of social equality expands as new forms of social inequality become apparent and new solutions become possible.

=== Historical examples ===
Illustrating the combat fought in favor of this application on many fronts are the following episodes:

- The Abolitionist Movement (1700s–1800s): Campaigns in Britain, the U.S., and elsewhere fought to end slavery, emphasizing the equal dignity of all humans.
- The Declaration of Independence (1776): Written by Thomas Jefferson; included his famous phrase “all men are created equal,” which became a foundational principle for later equality movements, even though its application was limited at the time.
- The French Revolution (1789): A period of political and societal change in France in view of the abolition of privileges.
- Women's Suffrage Movements (1848–1900s): From the Seneca Falls Convention in 1848 to suffrage victories in Britain and beyond, these movements secured women's right to vote and expanded civic equality.
- The Meiji Reforms in Japan (1868–1912): Abolished feudal hierarchies and introduced legal equality among citizens, modernizing Japanese society.
- Trade Union and Charitable Movements in France (1936 onward): Included labor rights campaigns and charitable initiatives such as those led by Abbé Pierre and the International Movement ATD Fourth World.
- The United Nations (1945 onward): Through its specialized institutions, sought to promote more stable and concrete dialogue and cooperation between its members.
- The Indian Independence Movement (1900s–1947): Gandhi used nonviolent resistance to challenge colonial rule and promote equality.
- The Bandung Conference (1955): Alongside other anti-colonialist movements, reclaimed a better sharing of the world than that realized between great powers at the Yalta Conference.
- The Civil Rights Movement (1950s–1960s): With leaders like Martin Luther King Jr., fought for racial equality and dismantling segregation laws.
- The Anti-Apartheid Movement in South Africa (1948–1994): Led by Nelson Mandela and others, this movement dismantled racial segregation and established equal citizenship.
- Disability Rights Movement (1970s–present): Advocated for equal access, legal protections, and inclusion, culminating in legislation like the Americans with Disabilities Act (1990).
- Microcredit Initiatives (1970s–present): Efforts such as those of Muhammad Yunus promoted equal opportunities by providing financial access to disadvantaged communities.
- LGBTQ+ Rights Movements (1970s–present): Fought for equality in marriage, employment, and social recognition for the LGBTQ+ community.

== Philosophical history ==
Early conceptions of social equality appear in Ancient Greek philosophy. The Stoic philosophers believed that human reason is universal. Plato considered the natures of equality when building society in the Republic, including both a monastic equality and equality in depravity. Aristotle also developed a conception of equality, particularly regarding citizenship, though he rejected the concept of total social equality in favour of social hierarchy. Social equality developed as a practicable element of society in Europe during the Reformation in which traditional religious hierarchies were challenged. The development of post-Reformation political philosophy provided a secular foundation for social equality and political science created empirical systems to analyze social equality in practice.

Social equality was further redefined through the secular and rational philosophies that emerged during The Enlightenment in the 17th and 18th century. Philosophers such as Locke and Rousseau argued that legitimate political authority must rest on the equal rights of citizens, while Montesquieu and Voltaire emphasized equality in governance and freedom of thought. Kant's moral philosophy reinforced the universal dignity of individuals, and Wollstonecraft extended these principles to women, challenging gender hierarchies. These Enlightenment ideas provided the intellectual foundation for modern democratic societies and the expansion of human rights.

The contemporary notion of social equality was developed in the 20th century by political philosophers such as John Rawls, Ronald Dworkin, and Amartya Sen. Rawls defined equality through primary goods like liberty, opportunity, respect, and wealth. Dworkin incorporated a concept of responsibility into Rawls' approach, saying that individuals are personally responsible for voluntary decisions but not natural talents or pre-dispositions. Sen rejected Rawls' measurement of resources in favour of the capability to function. Robert Nozick is known for rejecting Rawls' conception of social equality, arguing that the individual who produced a resource is entitled to it, even if this produces unequal results.

== Types ==
Social equality is a major element of equality for any group in society. Gender equality includes social equality between men, women, and intersex people, whether transgender or cisgender. Historically, women are harmed significantly more by a lack of gender equality, resulting in a higher risk of poverty along with violence, where women across all different countries face abuse or sexual assault. According to the World Health Organization, about every one in every three women face hardships with this. Racial equality and ethnic equality include social equality between people of different races and ethnic origins. Social equality can also be applied to belief and ideology, including equal social status for people of all political or religious beliefs.

The rights of people with disabilities pertain to social equality. Both physical and mental disabilities can prevent individuals from participating in society at an equal level, due to environmental factors as well as stigmas associated with disability. Social equality includes both the treatment of people with disabilities and the accommodation of those to facilitate equal participation in society. Laws are put in place to protect the rights of disabled people such as ADA (Americans with Disabilities Act), which prohibits discrimination in government services, employment, and any public accommodations.

Political and economic equality are commonly overlooked. The ability to participate in the political process is a right that any citizen holds. Movements such as the Voting Rights Act of 1965, and the publications of the 14th and 19th amendment expanded legal protections to insure political equality for all people. While these legal milestones strengthened political rights, true economic equality remains far more complicated. Economic systems often produce unequal access to resources, education, and opportunity, creating gaps that legislation alone cannot fully close. Because of this, the promise of equal participation can feel incomplete when economic barriers still limit many people's ability to thrive or to engage in civic life.

== Means ==
Economic development and industrialization are correlated with increased social equality, along with the idea of an evenly distribution of resources within societies. The industrialization process in which a developing country becomes a developed country corresponds to a significant increase in social equality, and further economic development and growth in developed countries corresponds with further increases in social equality. Education and social equality are also correlated, and increased access to education promotes social equality among individuals.

Other factors have also been correlated with increases in social equality. Access to healthcare and social protection systems is associated with reduced disparities in health and living standards. Democratic participation and civil rights protections are correlated with greater equality in political representation and legal status. Welfare policies and redistributive taxation have been linked to moderation of economic inequality. Together, these correlations suggest that economic development, education, healthcare, and democratic institutions are interconnected with the advancement of social equality.

== Standards ==
=== Ontological ===
The standard of equality that states everyone is created equal at birth is called ontological equality. This type of equality can be seen in many places like within Venezuela's Independence day, a day focused on celebrating their adopted Declaration of Independence. Inspired by The United States Declaration of Independence. This early document, which states many of the values of the United States of America, has this idea of equality embedded in it. It says "all men are created equal, that they are endowed by their Creator with certain unalienable Rights". The statement reflects the philosophy of John Locke and his idea that all are equal in terms of certain natural rights.

=== Opportunity ===
Another standard of equality is equality of opportunity, "the idea that everyone has an equal chance to achieve wealth, social prestige, and power because the rules of the game, so to speak, are the same for everyone". This concept can be applied to society by assuming that no one has a head start. This views society almost as a game and any of the differences in equality standards are due to luck and playing the "game" to one's best ability. Formal equality refers to equal opportunity for individuals based on merit while substantive equality reforms to equality of outcomes for groups.

Lesley A. Jacobs, the author of Pursuing Equal Opportunities: The Theory and Practice of Egalitarian Justice, talks about equality of opportunity and its importance relating to egalitarian justice. Jacobs states that: "at the core of equality of opportunity... is the concept that, in competitive procedures designed for the allocation of scarce resources and the distribution of the benefits and burdens of social life, those procedures should be governed by criteria that are relevant to the particular goods at stake in the competition and not by irrelevant considerations such as race, religion, class, gender, disability, sexual orientation, ethnicity, or other factors that may hinder some of the competitors' opportunities at success."

This concept points out factors like race, gender, class, etc. that should not be considered when talking about equality through this notion. Conley also mentions that this standard of equality is at the heart of a bourgeois society, such as a modern capitalist society, or "a society of commerce in which the maximization of profit is the primary business incentive". It was the equal opportunity ideology that civil rights activists adopted in the era of the civil rights movement in the 1960s. This ideology was used by them to argue that Jim Crow laws were incompatible with the standard of equality of opportunity.

=== Condition ===
Another notion of equality introduced by Conley is equality of condition. Through this framework is the idea that everyone should have an equal starting point. Conley goes back to his example of a game of Monopoly to explain this standard. If the game of four started with two players both having an advantage of $5,000 to start with and both already owning hotels and other property while the other two players both did not own any property and both started with a $5,000 deficit, then from a perspective of the standard of equality of condition, one can argue that the rules of the game "need to be altered to compensate for inequalities in the relative starting positions". From this policies are formed to even equality which in result bring an efficient way to create fairer competition in society. Here is where social engineering comes into play where society is altered to give an equality of condition to everyone based on race, gender, class, religion, etc. when it is made justifiable that the proponents of the society make it unfair for them.

Sharon E. Kahn, the author of Academic Freedom and the Inclusive University, talks about equality of condition in their work as well and how it correlates to freedom of individuals. Kahn claims that in order to have individual freedom there needs to be equality of condition "which requires much more than the elimination of legal barriers: it requires the creation of a level playing field that eliminates structural barriers to opportunity". Her work refers to academic structure and its problem with equalities and claims that to "ensure equity... we need to recognize that the university structure and its organizational culture have traditionally privileged some and marginalized other; we need to go beyond theoretical concepts of equality by eliminating systemic barriers that hinder the equal participation of members of all groups; we need to create and equality of condition, not merely an equality of opportunity". "Notions of equity, diversity, and inclusiveness begin with a set of premises about individualism, freedom and rights that take as given the existence of deeply rooted inequalities in social structure," therefore in order to have a culture of the inclusive university, it would have to "be based on values of equity; that is, equality of condition" eliminating all systemic barriers that go against equality.

=== Outcome ===
The fourth standard of equality is equality of outcome, which is "a position that argues each player must end up with the same amount regardless of the fairness". In this standard of equality, the idea is that "everyone contributes to society and the economy according to what they do best". Under this notion of equality, Conley states that "nobody will earn more power, prestige, and wealth by working harder". Equality of outcome is often falsely conflated with communism or Marxist philosophy, even though these ideologies promote the distribution of resources based on need or contribution (depending on the level of development of a society's productive forces), rather than equality. Vladimir Lenin stated that the "abolition of classes means placing all citizens on an equal footing about the means of production belonging to society as a whole. It means giving all citizens equal opportunities of working on the publicly-owned means of production, on the publicly-owned land, at the publicly-owned factories, and so forth".

When defining equality of outcome in education, "the goals should not be the liberal one of equality of access but equality of outcome for the median number of each identifiable non-educationally defined group, i.e. the average women, negro, or proletarian or rural dweller should have the same level of educational attainment as the average male, white, suburbanite". The outcome and the benefits from equality from education from this notion of equality promotes that all should have the same outcomes and benefits regardless of race, gender, religion etc. The equality of outcome in Hewitt's point of view is supposed to result in "a comparable range of achievements between a specific disadvantaged group – such as an ethnic minority, women, lone parents and the disabled – and society as a whole".

Information ethics is impartial and universal because it brings to ultimate completion the process of enlargement of the concept of what may count as a centre of a (no matter how minimal) moral claim. This now includes every instance of being understood informationally, no matter whether physically implemented or not. In this respect, information ethics holds that every entity, as an expression of being, has a dignity constituted by its mode of existence and essence (the collection of all the elementary properties that constitute it for what it is), which deserve to be respected (at least in a minimal and overridable sense), and hence place moral claims on the interacting agent and ought to contribute to the constraint and guidance of his ethical decisions and behaviour. Floridi goes on to claim that this "ontological equality principle means that any form of reality (any instance of information/being), simply for the fact of being what it is, enjoys a minimal, initial, overridable, equal right to exist and develop in a way which is appropriate to its nature." Values in his claims correlate to those shown in the sociological textbook You May Ask Yourself by Dalton Conley. The notion of "ontological equality" describes equality by saying everything is equal by nature. Everyone is created equal at birth. Everything has an equal right to exist and develop by its nature.
