= Epistemocracy =

The term epistemocracy has many conflicting uses, generally designating someone of rank having some epistemic property or other. Nassim Nicholas Taleb used it in 2007 to designate a utopian type of society where the leadership possesses epistemic humility. He claims the French writer Michel de Montaigne was a modern epistemocrat. He points out, however, that it is difficult to assert authority on the basis of one's uncertainty; leaders who are assertive, even if they are incorrect, still gather people together.

A. James Gregor used the term in reference to communism: "Maoism, like the Marxist-Leninist system upon which it modeled itself, was an `epistemocracy,' rule by those possessed of that infallible wisdom embodied in the `universal truth of Marxism'" J.R Simpson used it in terms of theocracy: "The model for this concentration of knowledge in the hands of a single group is the epistemocracy of the Old Testament priests..."

Another use is in relation to modern science or western technocracy: "...the social promotion and political em-powerment of a new class of experimental scientists ... what sociologists of science like Blumenberg call an epistemocracy."

== See also ==
- Skepticism
- Empiricism
- Steven Connor: A scholar critical of Epistemocracy
