= Scott Cohen =

Scott Cohen may refer to:

- Scott Cohen (actor) (born 1961), American actor
- Scott Lee Cohen (born 1965), American politician from Illinois
- Scott Cohen (music industry executive)

== See also ==
- Cohen (surname)
