= Grahame Thompson =

British academic

Grahame Thompson is Professor of Political Economy in the Department of Politics and International Studies (POLIS) at the Open University, and a visiting professor at Copenhagen Business School.

== Training and career ==
Thompson was educated at the University of Birmingham where he obtained his MA in economics. He also has a PhD from the University of Leicester.

Thompson trained as an economist and was originally employed by the Economics Department of the Open University. In 2000, he transferred to the Government and Politics department, which later became POLIS. He was head of department from 2001 to 2003 and for 2007.

His most notable work has been on globalization. In his book, Globalization in Question, written first with Paul Hirst and, in the 2009 new edition with Simon Bromley, he takes a basically sceptical position on globalization as being something which is substantially new.

== Articles ==
- "The fate of territorial engineering: mechanisms of territorial power and post-liberal forms of international governance", International Politics, vol.44, 2007.
- "Exploring sameness and difference: fundamentalisms and the future of globalization", Globalizations, vol.3, no.4, (2006)
- "Religious fundamentalisms, territories and 'globalization'", Economy and Society, vol.36, no.1, (2007)
