= The Orchard (company) =

American music and entertainment company

Orchard Enterprises NY, Inc.
- Trade name: The Orchard
- Formerly: The Orchard Enterprises Inc.
- Type: Subsidiary
- Industry: Music; Entertainment
- Founded: 1997; 29 years ago
- Founders: Scott Cohen; Richard Gottehrer
- Headquarters: New York City, U.S.
- Area served: Worldwide
- Key people: Brad Navin (CEO); Colleen Theis (President and COO)
- Parent: Sony Music Entertainment (2012–present)
- Website: theorchard.com

Orchard Enterprises NY, Inc., doing business as The Orchard, is a full-service global music distribution and artist services company headquartered in New York City. The world's largest independent music distributor, it specializes in digital and physical distribution and artist/label services. In addition to distribution, it offers clients marketing and advertising, publishing administration, rights management and royalty accounting, video monetization, data analytics, sync licensing, e-commerce, and other services. It is the U.S. market leader among distribution companies, with an 8.9% market share, and is a division of Sony Music Entertainment, which acquired The Orchard in a series of transactions between 2012 and 2015.

== History ==
The Orchard was founded in 1997 by Richard Gottehrer and Scott Cohen in New York City, as a distributor of independent music (then in the form of physical product) to online music stores. The company was a major early player in the shift to digital music distribution when it licensed a catalog of about 150,000 titles to iTunes at the launch of Apple's music platform.

Following an initial acquisition of The Orchard by Dimensional Associates in 2003, Sony Music in 2012 acquired a majority stake of 51% in the company in a cash and equity deal with an estimated total valuation of $100 million. At this time, Sony Music merged The Orchard with IODA (Independent Online Distribution Alliance), another independent distribution company in its portfolio. In 2015, the remaining equity in The Orchard was acquired by Sony Music for over $200 million.

Brad Navin was appointed CEO in 2010, a post he continues to hold. Under his tenure, the company adopted the business model of providing label services to independent label clients, digitizing their catalogs, and building in-house supply chain processes and technology, expanding into worldwide markets.

In 2012, Colleen Theis, who had served as managing director for the UK and Europe, was named The Orchard's chief operating officer. Today she serves as president as well as COO. As of 2023 the UK was The Orchard's second-largest market.

In 2017, Sony Music merged the Orchard and independent distributor RED Music, which at the time were two of the U.S.'s three largest independent distributors, into a single company operating under The Orchard brand. This followed Sony Music's acquisitions of UK distributor Essential, Germany's Finetunes, and Norway's Phonofile and merger of all three distributors into The Orchard. At this time The Orchard grew to more than 300 employees in 30 offices around the world. With revenue of about $500 million, it became the world's largest indie music distributor. By 2024 The Orchard had more than 700 employees operating in 48 cities, distributing 26,000 independent labels. In May 2026 Billboard estimated that The Orchard was approaching $2 billion in annual revenue and had a U.S. market share of about 10.75%.

=== RED Music ===
RED Music
- Formerly: Important Record Distributors; RED Distribution
- Founded: 1979; 47 years ago
- Defunct: June 5, 2017; 9 years ago
- Fate: Merged Into The Orchard
- Successor: The Orchard
- Headquarters: New York City, United States
- Key people: Bob Morelli (president)
- Parent: Sony Music

RED Music, stylized RED MUSIC, formerly RED Distribution, LLC (Relativity Entertainment Distribution) was a Sony-owned sales and marketing division that merged under The Orchard in 2017. RED previously handled releases for more than sixty independent record labels.

Founded in 1979 as mainly a hard rock music distributor called Important Record Distributors, which originally distributed Metallica's first two LPs in the US, it became RED Distribution in the 1990s. In October 1999, Sony Music Entertainment sold 80% of RED Distribution to Edel SE & Co. KGaA. In March 2016, Sony announced the acquisition of Essential Music and Marketing. As part of this deal, a new company was launched, Red Essential, which is based at the Cooking Vinyl Group's West London offices. The company is now located in Farringdon. This division had very little correlation to RED in the United States besides its name.

On June 1, 2017, Sony Music announced that it would merge RED's British affiliate, Red Essential, into The Orchard. On June 5, Sony also included the American RED Distribution in its merger with The Orchard. The "RED" name will remain active as a new entity named RED MUSIC, which will provide marketing, label services, and joint ventures between Sony's labels and independent labels. As of September 2019, RED MUSIC was completely shuttered and consolidated into The Orchard.

=== YouTube ===
The Orchard's YouTube multi-channel network has more than 8,000 channels and as of July 2026 was the No. 4 U.S. YouTube partner channel in terms of unique video viewers. The Orchard provides "technology, expertise, large scale [video] service and support" and fingerprinting services and monetization, "help[ing] artists and labels build a global fanbase and increase revenue via short-form video and user-generated content (UGC) platforms."

=== Owned repertoire ===
The Orchard owns the catalogues of TVT Records, Premium Latin Music (home to Aventura), Blind Pig Records, Frenchkiss Records, Shrapnel Records, Music of the World, Balcony TV, Metal Injection, and MetalSucks.

=== Film distribution ===
In 2019, the Orchard Film was sold and renamed 1091 Media.
