= David Nicholls (theologian) =

British political theologian (1936–1996)

The Reverend David Nicholls
- Born: David Gwyn Nicholls; Woking, England; 3 June 1936
- Died: 13 June 1996 (aged 60); Oxford, England
- Spouse: Gillian Sleigh (m. 1968)

Ecclesiastical career
- Religion: Christianity (Anglican)
- Church: Church of England
- Ordained: 1962 (deacon); 1963 (priest)

Academic background
- Education: London School of Economics; King's College, Cambridge; Yale University
- Thesis: Authority in Church and State (1962)
- Doctoral advisor: Alec Vidler
- Influences: John Neville Figgis; Cheslyn Jones

Academic work
- Discipline: Area studies; theology
- Sub-discipline: Caribbean studies; political theology
- Institutions: University of the West Indies; Exeter College, Oxford; St Antony's College, Oxford

David Gwyn Nicholls (3 June 1936 – 13 June 1996) was an English Anglican priest, theologian, and Caribbean studies scholar who authored more than one hundred publications in the fields of political theology and Caribbean studies.

Nicholls was born in Woking, Surrey. He was educated at Woking Grammar School (1947–54), the London School of Economics (1954–57, Lash Prize 1956, BScEcon in government (first-class honours) 1957, Gladstone Prize 1957), King's College, Cambridge (1957–60, PhD in history 1972), Yale Divinity School (Henry Fellow 1960–66, STM 1962) and Chichester Theological College (1961–62, ordained deacon 1962, priest 1963). He incepted as a Master of Arts of the University of Oxford by special decree (1973) and was awarded the degree of Doctor of Letters by leave of the faculties of history and social studies (1991).

Before studying for ordination, he was tutor at the University of Cambridge and the Workers' Educational Association (1958–60). He was assistant chaplain to the University of London (1962–66), a tutor at the London School of Economics and Regent Street Polytechnic (1963–65), lecturer in government at the University of the West Indies, Trinidad (1966–73), visiting research fellow at the Institute of Race Relations, London (1970–71), official fellow, chaplain, and tutor of Exeter College, Oxford (1973–78), a senior member of St Antony's College, Oxford (1976–96), priest-in-charge and later vicar of the Church of St Mary and St Nicholas, Littlemore (1978–96) and Hulsean Lecturer at the University of Cambridge (1985–86).

The David Nicholls Memorial Library at Regent's Park College, Oxford, is named in his memory.

Nicholls was married to Gillian Sleigh from 1968 until his death in Oxford on 13 June 1996. Although they had no children, their household was augmented by a Macaw called William Paley, named after the philosopher.

== Publications ==
=== Politics and theology ===
Thesis

- David Nicholls, "Authority in Church and State: Aspects of the Thought of J.N. Figgis and his Contemporaries" (University of Cambridge PhD thesis, 1962)

Books as sole author

- David Nicholls, Church and State in Britain Since 1820 (London: Routledge & Kegan Paul, 1967)
- David Nicholls, Three Varieties of Pluralism (London: Macmillan, 1974)
- David Nicholls, The Pluralist State: the political ideas of J.N. Figgis and his contemporaries (London: Macmillan, 1975; 2nd edn, Basingstoke: Macmillan in association with St Antony's College, Oxford, 1994)
- David Nicholls, Deity and Domination: Images of God and the State in the Nineteenth and Twentieth Centuries (London: Routledge, 1989)
- David Nicholls, God and Government in an Age of Reason (London: Routledge, 1995)

Book as co-editor and contributor

- David Nicholls and Fergus Kerr, eds, John Henry Newman: Reason, Rhetoric and Romanticism (Bristol: Bristol Press, 1991), and 'Individualism and the Appeal to Authority', ibid.

Contributions in books

- David Nicholls, 'Gladstone, Newman and the Politics of Pluralism' and 'Gladstone and the Anglican Critics of Newman', in James D. Bastable, ed., Newman and Gladstone: Centennial Essays (Dublin: Veritas Publications, 1978)
- David Nicholls, 'The Politics of Dr Norman', in Kenneth Leech, ed., Christianity Reinterpreted (London: n.p., 1979)
- David Nicholls, 'Stepping out of Babylon: Sin, Salvation & Social Transformation in Christian Tradition' and 'Great Expectations: Christian Hope and Marxist Hope', in Kenneth Leech and Rowan Williams, eds, Essays Catholic and Radical: a Jubilee Group Symposium for the 150th Anniversary of the Beginning of the Oxford Movement 1833-1983 (London: Bowerdean Press, 1983)
- David Nicholls, 'Two Tendencies in Anglo-Catholic Political Theology', in Geoffrey Rowell, ed., Tradition Renewed: the Oxford Movement Conference Papers (London: Darton, Longman, & Todd; Allison Park, Pennsylvania: Pickwick, 1986)
- David Nicholls, 'Christianity and Politics', in Robert Morgan, ed., The Religion of the Incarnation: Anglican Essays in Commemoration of Lux Mundi (Bristol: Bristol Classical Press, 1989)
- David Nicholls, 'The Invisible Hand: Providence and the Market', in Paul Heelas and Paul Morris, eds, The Values of the Enterprise Culture (London: Routledge, 1991)
- David Nicholls, Prayer, Petition and Political Power, in Mart Bax and E. Koster, eds, Power and Prayer: Essays on Politics and Religion (Amsterdam: Free University Press, 1994)
- David Nicholls, 'Grace', in Paul Barry Clarke and Andrew Linzey, eds, Dictionary of Ethics, Theology and Society (London: Routledge, 1996)

Articles in journals

- David Nicholls, 'A Short and Easy Method with Mr Cowling', Cambridge Journal (February 1960)
- David Nicholls, 'Authority and the Development of Doctrine', Theology (April 1960)
- David Nicholls, 'Gladstone on Liberty and Democracy', Review of Politics 23:3 (1961), 401-9
- David Nicholls, 'Positive Liberty, 1880-1914', American Political Science Review 56:1 (1962), 114-28
- David Nicholls, 'Newman's Anglican Critics', Anglican Theological Review 47:4 (1965), 377-94
- David Nicholls, 'What is Liberal Protestantism?', Theology (November 1965)
- David Nicholls, 'Developing Doctrines and Changing Beliefs', Scottish Journal of Theology 19:3 (1966), 280-92
- David Nicholls, 'The Totalitarianism of Thomas Arnold', Review of Politics 29:4 (1967), 518-26
- David Nicholls, 'Few are Chosen: Some Reflections on the Politics of A.J. Balfour', Review of Politics 30:1 (1968), 33-42
- David Nicholls, 'Modifications and Movements', Journal of Theological Studies 25:2 (1974), 393-417
- David Nicholls, 'A Comment on "Consent"', Political Studies 27:1 (1979), 120-24
- David Nicholls, 'Images of God and the State', Theological Studies 42:2 (1981), 195-215
- David Nicholls, 'Fractions', Crucible (January 1982)
- David Nicholls, 'Divine Analogy: the Theological Politics of John Donne', Political Studies 32:4 (1984)
- David Nicholls, 'William Temple and the Welfare State', Crucible (1984)
- David Nicholls, 'Deity and Domination', New Blackfriars (January–February 1985)
- David Nicholls, 'Conscience and Authority in the Thought of W.G. Ward', Heythrop Journal (October 1985)
- David Nicholls, 'Images of God in Liberation Theology', Third World Book Review 1:4-5 (1985)
- David Nicholls, 'Federal Politics and Finite God: Images of God in US Theology', Modern Theology 4:4 (1988)
- David Nicholls, 'The Political Theology of John Donne', Theological Studies 49:1 (1988)
- David Nicholls, 'Politics and the Church of England', Political Quarterly (April 1990)
- David Nicholls, 'Trinity and Conflict', Theology (January–February 1993)
- David Nicholls, 'Addressing God as Ruler: Prayer and Petition', British Journal of Sociology 44:1 (1993)
- David Nicholls, 'Parson Malthus: Process and Providence', Anglican Theological Review (1995)
- David Nicholls, 'Scepticism and Sovereignty: the Significance of Lamennais', New Blackfriars (April–May 1996)

Jubilee Group pamphlets

- David Nicholls, Principalities and Powers (London: Jubilee Group, 1979)
- David Nicholls, A Great Mystery: Reflections on the Lichfield Report (London: Jubilee Group, 1981)
- David Nicholls, Fractions: Christian Reflections on Foreign Aid (London: Jubilee Group, 1982)
- David Nicholls and Rowan Williams, Politics and Theological Identity: Two Anglican Essays (London: Jubilee Group, 1984)
- David Nicholls, God and Government (Croydon: Jubilee Group, 1992)

Series as general editor

- Faith and the Future (9 vols, Oxford: Blackwell, 1983)

=== Caribbean studies ===
Books as sole author

- David Nicholls, From Dessalines to Duvalier: Race, Colour and National Independence in Haiti (Cambridge: Cambridge University Press, 1980; 2nd edn, Warwick University Caribbean Studies, Basingstoke: Macmillan Caribbean, 1988; 3rd edn, Warwick University Caribbean Studies, London: Macmillan Caribbean, 1996; rev. edn, New Brunswick, New Jersey: Rutgers University Press, 1996)
- David Nicholls, Economic Dependence and Political Autonomy: the Haitian Experience (Occasional Paper Series, McGill University Centre for Developing-Area Studies 9, Montreal: McGill University Centre for Developing-Area Studies, 1974)
- David Nicholls, Haiti in Caribbean Context: Ethnicity, Economy and Revolt (Basingstoke: Macmillan in association with St Antony's College, Oxford, 1985)

Contributions in books

- David Nicholls, Appendix to F. Duvalier & L. Denis, Die Klassenfrage in der Geschichte Haitis (Dortmund, 1970), pp. 102–9
- David Nicholls, 'Caste, Class and Colour in Haiti', in Cohn Clarke, ed., Caribbean Social Relations (Monograph series, Centre for Latin-American Studies, University of Liverpool 8, Liverpool: Centre for Latin-American Studies, University of Liverpool, 1978), pp. 4–16
- David Nicholls, 'Rural Protest and Peasant Revolt in Haiti, 1804-1869', in Malcolm Cross and Arnaud, eds, Peasants, Plantations and Rural Communities in the Caribbean (Guildford: Department of Sociology, University of Surrey; Leiden: Royal Institute of Linguistics and Anthropology, 1979)
- David Nicholls, 'Past and Present in Haitian Politics', in Charles Foster and Albert Valdman, eds, Haiti—Today and Tomorrow: An Interdisciplinary Study (Lanham, Maryland: University Press of America, 1984)
- David Nicholls, 'Cultural Dualism and Political Domination in Haiti', in Paul Sutton, ed., Dual Legacies in the Contemporary Caribbean (London: Frank Cass, 1986)
- David Nicholls, 'Haiti, c. 1870-1930', in Leslie Bethell, ed., The Cambridge History of Latin America, vol. 5 (Cambridge: Cambridge University Press, 1986; Spanish edn, Barcelona: Editorial Critica, 1992)
- David Nicholls, 'Haiti and the Dominican Republic', in Simon Collier, Harold Blakemore, and Thomas E. Skidmore, eds, The Cambridge Encyclopedia of Latin America and the Caribbean (Cambridge: Cambridge University Press, 1985; 2nd edn, Cambridge: Cambridge University Press, 1992)
- David Nicholls, 'Haiti: Race, Slavery and Independence', in Léonie J. Archer, ed., Slavery and Other Forms of Unfree Labour (History Workshop Series, London: Routledge, 1988)
- David Nicholls, 'Haiti', in A. Lowenthal, ed., Latin American and Caribbean Contemporary Record 1986-7 (1989)
- David Nicholls, 'Haiti: 1930 to present', in Leslie Bethell, ed., The Cambridge History of Latin America, vol. 7 (Cambridge: Cambridge University Press, 1990)
- David Nicholls, 'Lebanese of the Antilles', in Albert Hourani and Nadim Shehadi, eds, The Lebanese in the World: a Century of Emigration (Oxford: Centre for Lebanese Studies; London: I.B. Tauris, 1992)
- David Nicholls, 'Sultanism in Haiti?', in H.E. Chehabi and Juan J. Linz, eds, Sultanistic Regimes (Baltimore: Johns Hopkins University Press, 1998)

Articles in journals

- David Nicholls, 'On controlling the Colonels', Hemisphere Report (July 1970)
- David Nicholls, 'Religion and Politics in Haiti', Canadian Journal of Political Science 3:3 (1970), 400-14
- David Nicholls, 'Embryo-politics in Haiti', Government and Opposition 6:1 (1971), 75-85
- David Nicholls, 'East Indians and Black Power in Trinidad', Race 12:4 (1971) 443-60
- David Nicholls, 'Biology and Politics in Haiti', Race 13:2 (1971), 203-14
- David Nicholls (published under pseudonym), 'Dynastic Republicanism in Haiti', Political Quarterly 44:1 (1973), 77-84
- David Nicholls, 'A Work of Combat: Mulatto Historians and the Haitian Past, Journal of Interamerican Studies 16:1 (1974), 15-38
- David Nicholls, 'Ideology and Political Protest in Haiti, 1930-46', Journal of Contemporary History 9:4 (1974), 3-26
- David Nicholls, 'Idéologie et mouvements politiques en Haïiti, 1915-1946', Annales, Economies, Sociétés, Civilisations 30:4 (1975), 654-79
- David Nicholls, 'Poorest country of the Western World', The Geographical Magazine 50:1 (1977), 47-54
- David Nicholls, 'Race, couleur et indépendance en Haïti, 1804-1825', Revue d’Histoire Moderne et Contemporaine 25 (1978), 177-212
- David Nicholls, 'The Wisdom of Salomon: myth or reality?', Journal of Interamerican Studies, 20:4 (1978), 377-392
- David Nicholls, 'Prosperous State of Unrest', The Geographical Magazine 51:8 (1979), 555-59
- David Nicholls, 'No Hawkers and Pedlars, Levantines in the Caribbean', Ethnic and Racial Studies 4:4 (1981), 415-31
- David Nicholls (published under pseudonym), 'Haiti's Dynastic Despotism', Caribbean Review 13:1 (1984)
- David Nicholls, 'No More Duvalier but Still Divided', The Times (10 February 1985)
- David Nicholls, 'The Haitian Predicament' (San Germán, Puerto Rico, 1986)
- David Nicholls, 'The "Syrians" of Jamaica', The Jamaican Historical Review 15 (1986)
- David Nicholls, 'Haiti: the Rise and Fall of Duvalierism', Third World Quarterly 8:4 (1986), 1239-1252
- David Nicholls, 'Pompée Valentin Vastey: Royalist and Revolutionary', Revista de Historia de América 109 (1990) and Jahrbuch für Geschichte von Staat, Wirtschaft und Gesellschaft Lateinamerikas 28 (1991)

Academic offices
Preceded by David M. Thompson	Hulsean Lecturer; 1985–1986	Succeeded by Ingolf U. Dalferth
