= Scott Cohen (music industry executive) =

Music technology specialist (born 1965)

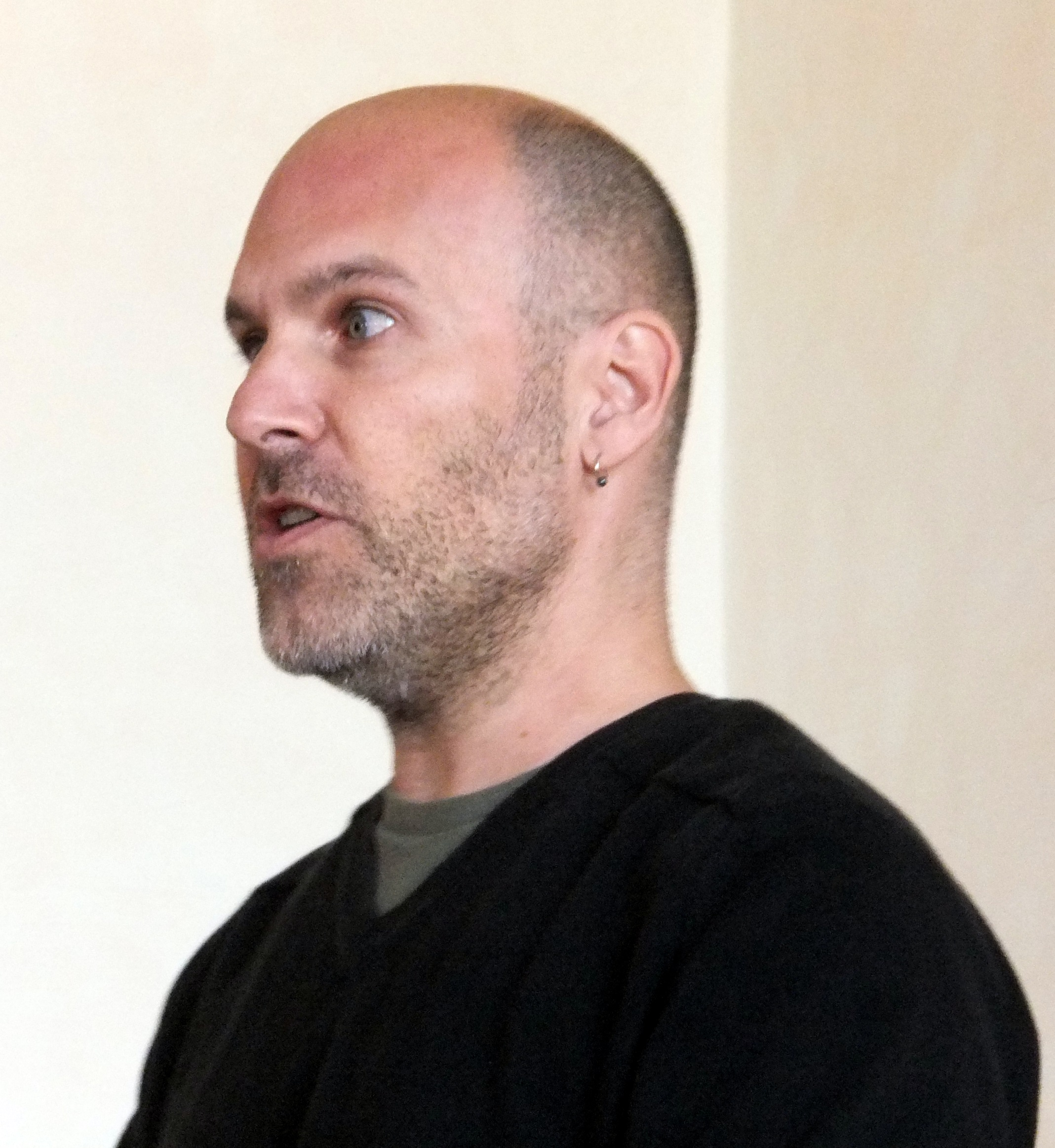
Scott Cohen at the International Radio Festival 2012, in Zurich.

Scott Cohen (born 1965) is a British music executive.

Cohen's music career started in the late 1980s in independent and major label artist management. In 1997, he and Richard Gottehrer (the co-founder of Sire Records) founded The Orchard. In 2016 Cohen was one of the founders of Cyborg Nest, a company that aimed to create extra senses in order to enhance human perception. In February 2019, Cohen retired from The Orchard and joined the senior management team at Warner Music Group. His role is the chief innovation officer. He sat on the British Phonographic Industry Council, and was the chairman of the board of music agency Sound Diplomacy. Cohen is now the CEO of JKBX, a fractionalized music royalties startup which will provide a regulated marketplace for users to buy and sell royalties.
