= Associationalism =

Political theory

Associationalism or associative democracy is a political movement in which "human welfare and liberty are both best served when as many of the affairs of a society as possible are managed by voluntary and democratically self-governing associations." Associationalism "gives priority to freedom in its scale of values, but it contends that such freedom can only be pursued effectively if individuals join with their fellows"

== The concept of associationalism ==
=== Roots ===
Associationalism is a European political theory, stemming from 19th and early 20th century social and political theorists from the continent. In France, such political thinkers as de Tocqueville, Proudhon, Durkheim, and Duguit. In England, such pluralists as G. D. H. Cole, John Neville Figgis, Harold Laski, Barker, and Frederic William Maitland. The theory provides an alternative to the previously popular doctrines of state-centered and collectivist ideals which had all but dominated twentieth-century politics: Western social democracy and Eastern bloc Marxist–Leninism.

=== Alexis de Tocqueville's associationalism ===
Alexis de Tocqueville's idea of associationalism “...stressed volunteerism, community spirit and independent associational life as protections against the domination of society by the state, and indeed as a counterbalance which helped to keep the state accountable and effective”. In Tocqueville’s vision then, economic freedom fosters greed, which engenders political apathy, which results in excessive individualism and passive reliance on the state. This political apathy will in turn result in the almost inevitable growth of government if left unchecked by associationalism. Thus, Tocqueville predicted that “It is easy to see the time coming in which men will be less and less able to produce, by each alone, the commonest bare necessities of life. The tasks of government must therefore perpetually increase, and its efforts to cope with them must spread its net ever wider. The more government takes the place of associations, the more will individuals lose the idea of forming associations and need the government to come to their help. That is a vicious cycle of cause and effect”.

=== Expanded definition ===
Associational democracy is, in essence, both a political structure and system of relations with the goal of easing pluralist social negotiation and priorities. It became an important aspect of public policy, countering previous laissez-faire traditions. Critics considered laissez-faire, which essentially equated to liberal individualism, as not conducive to the fostering of upward mobility in society. Associationalism, as opposed to liberal individualism, embodies a deliberate commitment to social cooperation as well as public well-being.

"Association....grew out of a sense of difference; for the middle class, it meant crossing class lines to bring together people of diverse identities and conditions". According to David Lewis, during the late 19th and early 20th century the new middle class required “...sanctioned private accumulation underwritten by a state which maintained legal order and stability"· As a result, the state needed to become powerful enough to maintain order, but not so strong as to become oppressive; neither laissez-faire nor statist. Finding this balance between transgressing autonomy and dangerous accumulation of power could prove difficult, and associationalism appeared to be a possible solution.

Associationalism brought together several political ideologies which, until its conception, were frequently at odds: pluralism, socialism, and cooperative mutualism. It provides for a pluralist rather than a statist or constraining collectivist socialism, yet it also provides for a mutualist and cooperative pluralism. This, as opposed to pluralism which reacts so far to statist communitarianism that it slides into an unrestricted competitive asociality.

== The Beginnings of American associationalism ==
=== Setting the stage ===
Urban politics in late 19th century America proved an ideal situation for the emergence of associationalism, ripe with several qualifications discussed by early associationalists. In addition, voter turnout was relatively high, though usually confined to party lines. Despite this fact, the two large national parties at the time (Democrats and Republicans) lacked significant ideological differences on specific issues. Respected members of communities across the country began to propose associationalism as a solution to America's social political problems. Several Protestant ministers such as Lyman Abbot, Washington Gladden, Josiah Strong, and Walter Raushenbusch began to call for a “social gospel.” “The next great principle,” Rauschenbusch proclaimed in 1896, “is association”. These growing political currents in favor of associationalism perhaps culminated when voters elected William McKinley and Theodore Roosevelt, a left statist associationalist who would become president shortly thereafter, in 1900.

=== Protective legislation ===
“Associationalism is fundamentally about collective governance – about the legal constitution of groups and bodies politic and the rules and bylaws that regulate the interrelationships of members”. During the early 20th century Congress passed a great deal of “protective legislation,” which was, in essence, legislated associationalism. Labor received improved work conditions resulting in fewer work-related injuries. Wages were increased while hours were decreased. In addition, probably the most important protective legislation pertained to the legal establishment and organization of large labor unions.

On the other side of the coin, employer costs went up resulting in outsourcing and decreased cash flow into such areas as research and development, slowing technological progress. Fewer hours and the fact that labor was more organized (allowing for an increase in strikes and protests) resulted in less production. Finally, such strong government influence over labor could lead to an abuse of power, favoring certain unions. The results of these legislated regulations suggested to critics that associationalism tends to benefit labor (the "people”) directly at the cost of both corporate management and technological progress.

== Early presidential associationalism ==
=== Theodore Roosevelt ===
Theodore Roosevelt (President 1901-1909) was the first true champion of American associationalism as evidenced by his intervention into the United Mine Workers strike of 1902. For the first time representatives from government, labor, and management met collectively and were able to resolve the conflict. When management was uncooperative, Roosevelt threatened to employ the military on behalf of labor to arrive at a resolution.

Instead, a five-member commission was established to communicate with the company management. Also, wages were increased by ten percent and the length of the work day was cut from ten hours to nine, keeping union membership sound. By demonstrating a new role for the state in such conflicts (aside from the previously held military positions) associationalism took root in American society and politics, and there wasn't another major coal strike in the country until the 1920s.

=== Woodrow Wilson ===
Woodrow Wilson (President 1913-1921), a regulatory liberal, employed associationalism during World War I to control and regulate capital, ensuring a steady flow of war supplies while minimizing the risk of breaks in manufacturing vital to the war effort. The establishment of such government agencies as the National War Labor Board were instrumental in preventing strikes and ensuring collective bargaining. In addition, Wilson appointed the country's first Secretary of Labor that was pro labor (William B. Wilson). The policies were implemented as America successfully met its goals in wartime production. There were nearly no strikes, many companies saw enormous profits, and the Allies won the war.

== Academic Context Surrounding Associationalism ==
A significant text surrounding associationalism is Robert D. Putnam’s book “Making Democracy Work: Civic Traditions in Modern Italy.” This book compares Northern and Southern Italy in the frame of the question, “What are the conditions for creating strong, responsive, effective representative institutions?” Putnam essentially answers this question with civil society and associationalism. Northern Italy had lower levels of associationalism which led to higher levels of fascism; whereas Southern Italy had more civic engagement and therefore less support towards autocratic rule.

However, association in civic societies is not always a source for good. Sheri Berman in her text, “Civil Society and the Collapse of the Weimar Republic,” argues that participation in civil societies can also help mobilize people to weaken democracy. This claim is analyzed through the case study of the NSDAP (Nazi Party). This study provides a counterexample to Putnam, showing how the NSDAP rose to power not by attracting alienated Germans, but rather by recruiting highly activist individuals that mobilized the political agenda of the Nazi party. In fact, the Nazi activists’ associational skills helped expand the party’s appeal, weakening democracy across the nation.
