= Thomas Altheimer =

British artist

Frances Scott-Napier
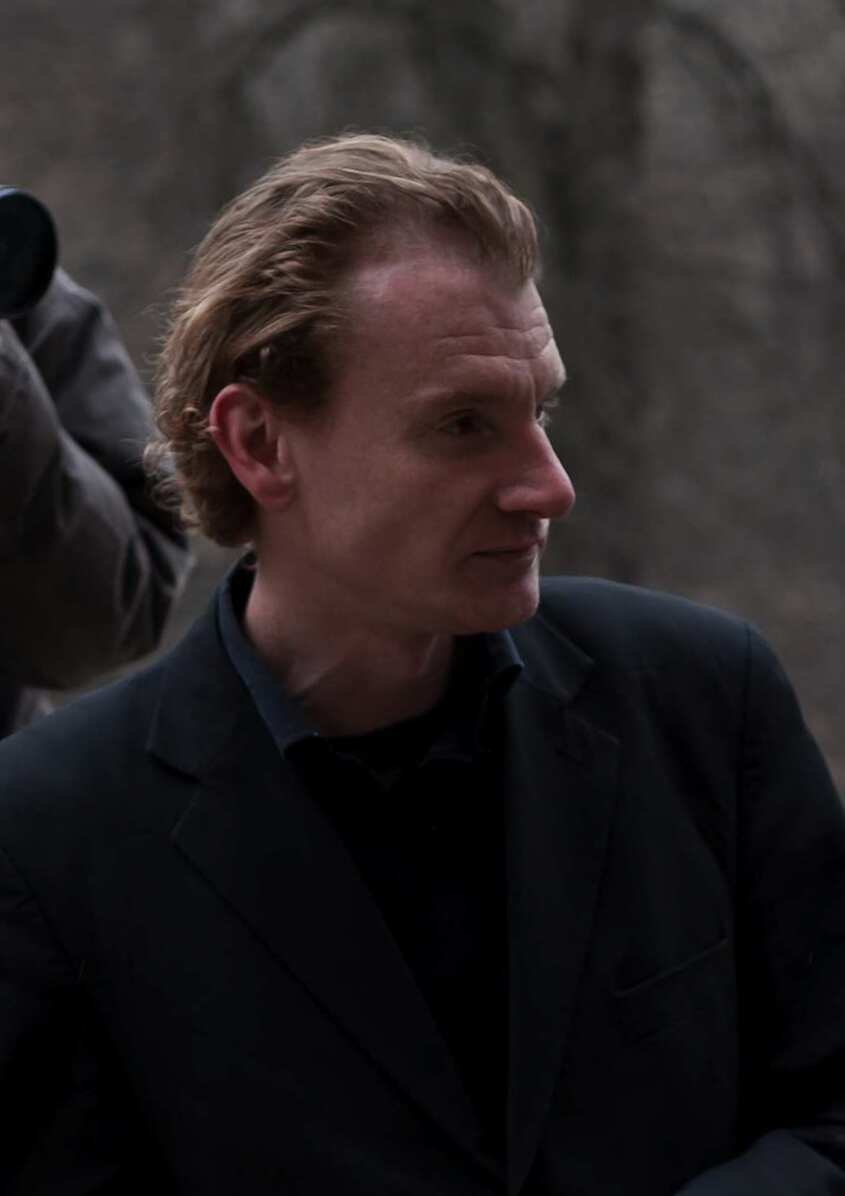
- Born: 1972
- Other names: Thomas Vann Altheimer
- Occupation(s): Artist, curator, filmmaker

Frances Scott-Napier (also known as Thomas Vann Altheimer; born Thomas Skade-Rasmussen Strøbech, 1972) is a filmmaker, activist, comedian, conceptual and performance artist. He is an alumnus of a now defunct London Consortium (Birkbeck College) and holds a PhD in art practice from Goldsmiths College. He was awarded his doctorate in 2012 for the thesis "Fictioneering Rogues, or, The End of the Artist". Altheimer is known for using his identity as a site for political experimentation and exploration. This work has led to a series of projects — so-called parallel actions — which seek to blur the boundaries between art and life. During the presidency of George W. Bush, his work would often make use of political forms as conceptual readymades. Altheimer works in the Situationist tradition with détournement as a key tactic. In recent years the impact of several legal proceedings has foregrounded questions of fictionalisation and identity in his work. He has exhibited and performed internationally in artist-run spaces like Alma Enterprises in London and municipal art spaces like the ICA in London, Angel's Gate in San Pedro and Nikolaj, Center of Contemporary Art in Copenhagen. His films have been broadcast by ZDF, Arte, DR and ORF and screened at several international film festivals. In 2007 Wiener Festwochen commissioned work from Altheimer in combination with performances on the theme of democracy. He currently lives and works in Los Angeles.

== Biography ==
=== Ticket to Denmark (2002) ===
In the spring of 2002, as a low-ranking employee of the newly formed Ministry of Refugee, Immigration and Integration Affairs, Altheimer conceived and launched an online dating service called "Ticket to Denmark" with software similar to that of match.com and graphics by Dennis Orneborg. Danish citizens and immigrants were invited to upload dating profiles. The site listed two main profile options: "marry out of love" and "marry out of convenience". The latter option was an opportunity for immigrants for a fast-track citizenship via marriage with Danish citizens, who on their side offered to marry out of convenience. The matching service was put in place to bypass new laws enacted by the Danish parliament and the right-wing Government, under the leadership of Anders Fogh Rasmussen, to curb immigration. The first marriage via Ticket to Denmark was announced in May 2002 – between a woman from Africa and a man from Denmark. Altheimer announced that his ambition was to fill the biggest stadium in Copenhagen in a "transnational festival of love" – with throngs of happy couples in the manner of the moonie mass weddings. The first profile on the site was Altheimer's own, as he offered to marry an immigrant despite having a family of his own. The matter was discussed in the Danish Folketing's question time. Altheimer was reported to the police by Morten Messerschmidt, member of the European Parliament for the Danish People's Party. As a result of his effort, he lost his job and received multiple death threats.

=== The Democracy – Destination: Iraq (2004) ===
In 2004 he toured Iraq with his Parallel Action collective, offering democracy from a box. When this attempt failed he went to the US in October to re-invigorate American democracy in the weeks leading up to the Presidential Election that saw George W. Bush re-elected.

=== Attacking Guantanamo Bay with Beethoven (2005) ===
In November 2005, setting out from Ocho Rios on Jamaica, Altheimer attacked Guantanamo Bay in a small boat, blasting the American military base with Beethoven's Symphony No. 3 playing on a ghetto blaster. The attempt was documented by the Danish performance artist Ulla Hvejsel in her film "Operation Just cause II – Europe strikes back". Academy Award-winning documentary filmmaker Malik Bendjelloul reported on this effort for Swedish TVs Kobra. The segment was broadcast on 15 March 2008.

=== The Democracy – Destination: Iran (2006) ===
2006 saw an attempt at instigating a Democratic revolution in Iran. This was to be the last outing for the democracy box. The experiments, journeys and battles in the name of the democracy were the subject of a retrospective exhibition, "The Return of the Democracy," in Nikolaj Contemporary Art Center in Copenhagen in 2007.

=== Europe For President (2008) ===
In 2008 he attempted to launch Hannah Jefferson as Europe's preferred candidate for president in the US election. The campaign culminated at the 2008 Democratic National Convention when Altheimer sought to persuade delegates to get behind her. Realising defeat during the final roll call, Altheimer brought a sign that said "Europeans Against Obama" on to the floor. Delegates moved to tear the placard from him and he was subsequently escorted out of the convention by Lakewood police.

=== Lawsuit / Plaintiff / Danish High Court (2009–2011) ===
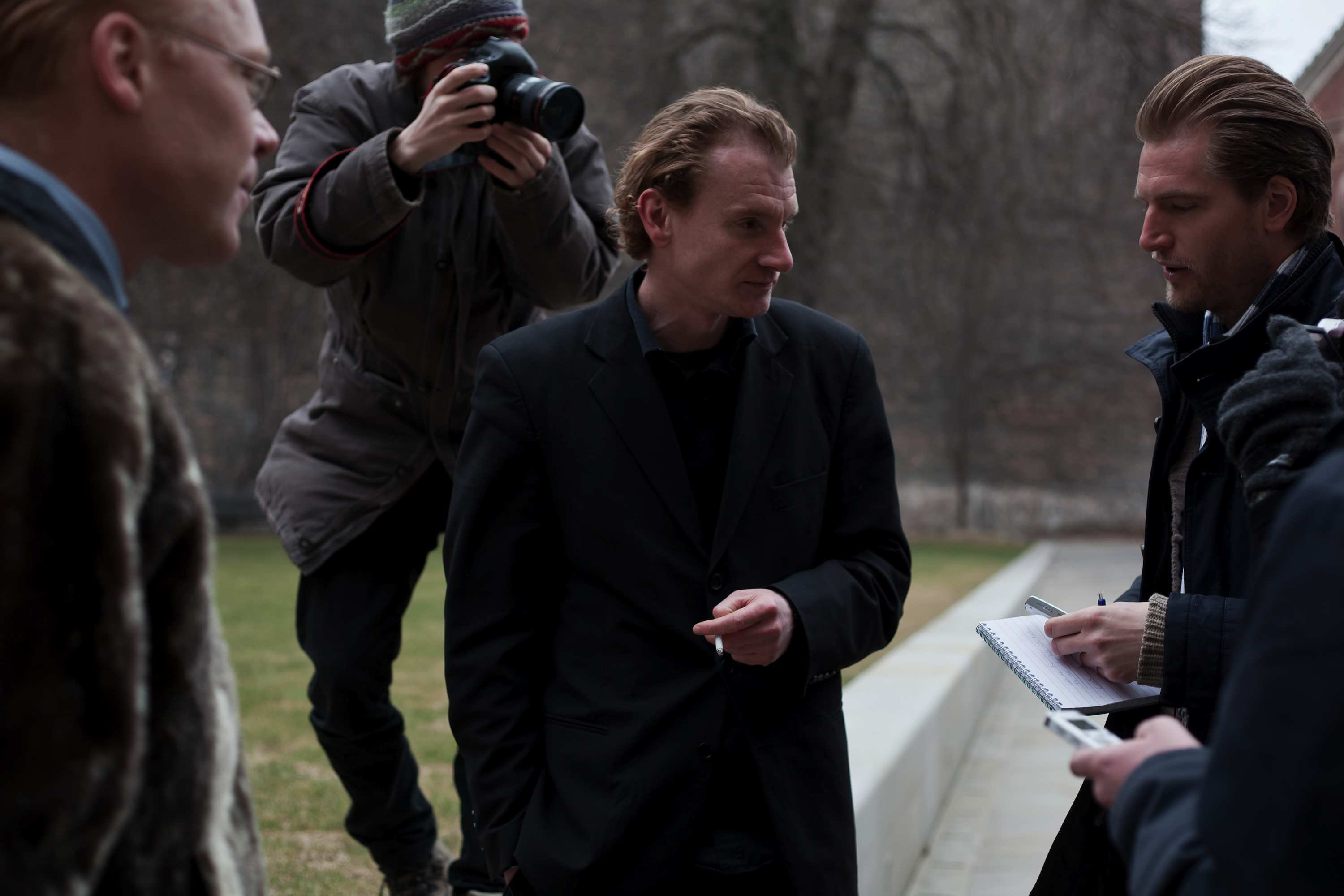
Altheimer responds to the High Court ruling

In 2011 Altheimer lost a lawsuit against his former collaborator Claus Beck-Nielsen and the Danish publishing house Gyldendal at the High Court in Copenhagen (Courts of Denmark). The lawsuit took issue with Beck-Nielsen's use of his biography, work and image in two consecutive novels, Selvmordsaktionen (The Suicide Campaign), Gyldendal 2005 and Suverænen (The Sovereign), Gyldendal 2008 (later published in Norway as Suverenen, Oktober Forlag, 2009). At the centre of the case was the decision by the publishing house to use Altheimer's picture on the dust jacket of Suverænen as well as in promotional material without prior permission. The High Court dismissed all Altheimer's claims in its ruling of 17 March 2011. Responding to the High Court decision, Altheimer is quoted for saying that he would never again visit Denmark. He also announced that his future work would deal solely with the nature of love.

=== Lawsuit / Defendant / Copenhagen City Court (2012) ===
Less than a year after losing the lawsuit in the Danish High Court, Altheimer was sued by Danske Bank due to debt. He rejected the bank's claim, arguing that he no longer exists. In a plea to the Copenhagen City Court, he refers the plaintiff to publisher Gyldendal and author Claus Beck-Nielsen for payment as the lawful owners of the copyright to his former identity.

== Films ==
=== Europe for President (2008) ===
The Europe for President campaign was documented in Altheimer's film Europe for President (2008), which won a World Silver Medal at the New York Festivals. The film was produced by the Austrian Superfilm and co-produced by ZDF, ORF in co-operation with ARTE and RTR.

=== I Am Fiction (2012) ===
Altheimer has worked for a number of years with director Max Kestner on a film project called I Am Fiction, which is related to his literary lawsuit. The film is produced by Carsten Holst in co-operation with the Danish Film Council and DR. It pre-premiered as part of the main competition at CPH:DOX in November 2012.
