= Inviolet Row =

American indie rock band

- Origin: Las Vegas, Nevada
- Genres: baroque pop, experimental rock, space rock
- Years active: 2001–present
- Members: Lee Scrivner; Kevin Brewer; Casey Johnson; Paul Sinnott
- Past members: Abe Millett; Ryan McIlvaine; Jack Cowell; Jason Handleman; Samuel Daniel; Ronnie Vannucci Jr.
- Website: www.InvioletRow.com

Inviolet Row is an indie rock band from Las Vegas, Nevada. Formed in 2001 by Lee Scrivner, Casey Johnson, Kevin Brewer, and Abe Millet, the band released the albums Consolation Prizes (2002) and Nevertheless (2005), and continues to write new material.

== Founding ==
Inviolet Row was founded by Lee Scrivner (guitar and vocals), Kevin Brewer (guitar), Casey Johnson (bass) and Abe Millet (drums) in Las Vegas, Nevada in 2001. Early that year they began writing and recording songs for what was to become their debut album, Consolation Prizes. Millett left the band while the album was being mixed to devote more time to other projects, eventually joining Third Eye Blind in 2008. The mixing and recording of their debut took over a year because of personnel changes and technical glitches, and during this time Ronnie Vannucci Jr. briefly sat in as a replacement drummer, just weeks before joining The Killers.

=== Consolation Prizes ===
Consolation Prizes was released in 2002 to largely positive reviews. The Las Vegas Weekly compared the band to The Psychedelic Furs, and another review drew positive comparisons to The Church and Radiohead, saying "Front man Lee Scrivner's lyrics are just as lovely and often as obscure as those of Steve Kilbey, the Church's lead singer and bassist." The Big Takeover likened Scrivner's singing to that of Sunny Day Real Estate frontman Jeremy Enigk. Paul Sinnott, formerly of the English rock band Family of Free Love, joined as permanent drummer after the album's release.

"Orange Horns," a track from Consolation Prizes, was featured in Magnet's New Music Sampler (2003).

=== Nevertheless ===
A second studio album, Nevertheless, was released in the summer of 2005. To record the album, the band tried unconventional recording approaches, such as putting microphones in a clothes dryer and recording a variety of drum pedal squeaks and reverberating sliding glass doors. Besides the usual rock ensemble, the recordings also used a back-masked 19th century psaltery.

Scrivner relocated to London after the release of Nevertheless to pursue a doctorate at the University of London, but the band continues to write and record material for a forthcoming album in a Las Vegas studio.

== Members ==
Current lineup

- Lee Scrivner – lead vocals, guitar (1999–2005, 2019–present)
- Kevin Brewer – guitar (1999–2002, 2019–present)

Former members

- Casey Johnson – bass (2000–2005)
- Jackson Cowell – guitar (2002–2005)
- Ryan McIlvaine – guitar (2003–2005)
- Abe Millett – drums (2000–2002)
- Samuel Daniel – keys (2003–2004)
- Ronnie Vannucci Jr. – drums (2002–2002)
- Paul Sinnott – drums (2002–2005)
- Jason Handelman – drums (1999–2000)

== Discography ==
- Consolation Prizes (2002)
- Nevertheless (2005)
