= Lee Scrivner =

American writer and cultural theorist (born 1971)

- Born: February 10, 1971 (age 55); Winnipeg, Manitoba, Canada
- Education: University of Utah (BA, MA); University of London (PhD)
- Occupation: Adjunct professor at American University
- Children: 4
- Writing career
- Period: 1999–present
- Genres: Humanities, English literature
- Subjects: Phenomenology, Ironic process theory, Philosophy of science, Philosophy of mind, Confirmation bias, Suggestibility, Sleep and Insomnia, History of medicine, History of psychology, Victorian, Modernism, Art manifesto
- Notable works: Casinolabs (2025); Becoming Insomniac (2014); The Sound Moneyfesto (2008); How to Write an Avant-Garde Manifesto (2008)
- Website: leescrivner.org

Lee Scrivner (born February 10, 1971) is an American novelist and cultural theorist known for his books Casinolabs (2025) and Becoming Insomniac (2014), and for his satirical avant-garde art manifestos. He writes on the literature, history, and culture of the Victorian and Modernist periods, as well as on contemporary issues.

== Early life and education ==
Scrivner was born in Winnipeg to American parents and was raised in Las Vegas, where he attended Bonanza High School. He received a BA and an MA in English from the University of Utah. He taught English at the University of Nevada, Las Vegas from 2001 to 2005, after which he pursued doctoral research under Steven Connor at the University of London. From 2007 to 2008, he lectured in the English department at Birkbeck College. He was a Fulbright lecturer in the humanities at Boğaziçi University, Istanbul. Since August 2015, he has taught at American University in Washington D.C.

== Creative work ==
=== Manifestos ===
Scrivner's creative work includes writing art manifestos and theatrical performances that incorporate live music and pre-recorded video. His work often deploys satire, anachronism, mock solemnity, and paradox.

Lord Garden's Masque (an anti-masque) (2009)

This took the form of a short play launched at the Weak Signals & Wild Cards exhibition at De Appel Arts Centre. Commentators have suggested that the name of the masque's main character Ascian might be a reference "to the people of Gene Wolfe's novel The Book of the New Sun in which the only permitted communication is the quoting of lines from the state's constitution." The pompous commissioner Lord Garden and his aides overhear the simple tune Ascian plays on a rustic reed pipe, prompting them to build an elaborate and expensive institution for the study of music. In the play, "cultural activity is frequently spoken of as a state building-block." Thus "Scrivner distills a reductive and absurdest scenario and exposes the self-defeating central ironies of over-regulated commissioning processes."

The Memory of Futurism and the Rise of the Insomnauts (2009)

This manifesto was performed in an underground bunker in Bloomsbury on the centenary of the publication in Le Figaro of F.T. Marinetti's Manifesto of Futurism. The performance was an homage to Marinetti as well as a response to (and attended by) Tom McCarthy, the general secretary of the International Necronautical Society.

The Sound Moneyfesto (2008)

The Sound Moneyfesto was launched at the Manifesto Marathon 2008 at the Serpentine Gallery in London. It incorporated word play, anachronism, and mock solemnity to comment on the 2008 financial crisis, especially the failures of Fannie Mae and Freddie Mac, and on the idea of sound money. The Sound Moneyfesto was launched in concert with manifestos from performance artist Marina Abramović, musician and producer Brian Eno, artists Gilbert & George, artist and musician Yoko Ono, and fashion designer Vivienne Westwood.

How to Write an Avant-Garde Manifesto (2008)

How to Write an Avant-Garde Manifesto was an art manifesto originally written in 2006 and taped to the front door of the Institute of Contemporary Arts, London. It was subsequently presented at the British Library's 2008 exhibition Breaking the Rules: The Printed Face of the European Avant Garde 1900–1937 with Auto Destructive and Fluxus artist Gustav Metzger and British Library curator Stephen Bury.

'With Usura' With Bells and Manifesto (2008)

This was written and performed in October 2012 at Tate Britain. Accompanied by a small chamber orchestra, Scrivner banged on a reverberating metal salad bowl with mock solemnity as he recited excerpts from The Cantos of Ezra Pound interspersed with his original commentary and occasional headlines from the Financial Times.

=== Music ===
Scrivner has released two albums of music with his band Inviolet Row, Consolation Prizes (2002) and Nevertheless (2005). He has also been involved in musical projects with Voiceworks (a collaboration between Wigmore Hall, Guildhall School of Music and Drama, and the Birkbeck Contemporary Poetics Research Centre).

== Select bibliography ==
Scrivner's poetry, short fiction, and academic writing have been published in Poet Lore, The Wolf, Teller (a magazine of stories distributed by Trolley Books), Otis Nebula, History Workshop Journal, and Modern Language Review.

=== Fiction ===
- Casinolabs - A Circus of Proxies (2025, Exeter House)

=== Nonfiction ===
- Becoming Insomniac: How Sleeplessness Alarmed Modernity (2014, Palgrave Macmillan).

=== Volume contributions ===
- “Gothic Insomnia in Literary Modernisms” in Gothic Modernisms, Daniel Dogherty, Catherine Enwright eds., (Clemson University Press, 2025)
- “That Sweet Secession: Sleep and Insomnia in Western Literature” in Sleep: Multi-Professional Perspectives, Andrew Green, Alex Westcombe, Ved Varma eds., (London: Jessica Kingsley Publishers, 2012). ISBN 978-1849050623
- ""Manifest-o-Meter," in Manifesto Marathon, Serpentine Gallery (Köln: Walther König, 2010). ISBN 978-3865606945
- “The Echo of Narcissism in Interactive Art" in Literatures in the Digital Era: Theory and Praxis, Amelia Sanz, Dolores Romero eds., (2007) ISBN 978-1847182913
