= Steven Connor =

British literary scholar

Steven Connor FBA
- Born: Steven Kevin Connor; 11 February 1955 (age 71); Sussex, England

Academic background
- Education: Christ's Hospital; Bognor Regis School
- Alma mater: Wadham College, Oxford
- Thesis: Prose fantasy and myth-criticism 1880–1900 (1980)
- Academic advisor: Terry Eagleton

Academic work
- Discipline: Literature
- Sub-discipline: English literature; Literary criticism; Literary history
- Institutions: Birkbeck College, University of London; Faculty of English, University of Cambridge; Peterhouse, Cambridge

Steven Kevin Connor, FBA (born 11 February 1955) is a British scholar of literature, language and culture. He was formerly the Academic Director of the London Consortium, Professor of Modern Literature and Theory at Birkbeck, University of London, Grace 2 Professor of English in the University of Cambridge and Fellow of Peterhouse, Cambridge. He is currently Professor of English at King's College, London.

== Early life and education ==
Connor was born on 11 February 1955 in Chichester, in Sussex, England. From 1966 to 1973, he was educated at Christ's Hospital and Bognor Regis School. In 1973, he matriculated into Wadham College, Oxford to study English; his tutor was Terry Eagleton. He graduated with a first class Bachelor of Arts (BA) degree in 1976. He remained at Oxford to study for a Doctor of Philosophy (DPhil) degree in English. He completed his doctorate in 1980 with a thesis titled "Prose fantasy and myth-criticism 1880–1900". Though never published in book form, his thesis anticipates all of his succeeding work as a phantasmatician, one taken up with the operations of fantasy, defined as things we want to be true, even if they are.

== Academic career ==
In 1979 or 1980, Connor joined Birkbeck College, University of London, as a lecturer in English. He was promoted to senior lecturer in 1990, made Reader in Modern English Literature in 1991, and appointed Professor of Modern Literature and Theory in 1994. He held two senior positions at the college: he was Pro-Vice-Master for International and Research Students between 1998 and 2001; and College Orator between 2001 and 2012. From 2002 to 2012, he additionally served as Academic Director of the London Consortium, a graduate school of the University of London that specialised in multidisciplinary programs.

In October 2012, Connor was appointed as Grace 2 Professor of English in the Faculty of English, University of Cambridge. He was also elected a Fellow of Peterhouse, Cambridge.

From 2023-26 he was Director of Research in the Digital Futures Institute, King's College, London.

== Personal life ==
In 1984, Connor married Lindsey Richardson. Together they had one daughter. They divorced in 1988. In 2005, Connor married Lynda Nead. Together they have two sons. Nead is an art historian and academic.

== Honours ==
In 2012, Connor was elected an Honorary Fellow of Birkbeck, University of London. In July 2016, he was elected a Fellow of the British Academy (FBA), the United Kingdom's national academy for the humanities and social sciences.

== Selected works ==
=== Books ===
- Charles Dickens (Oxford: Basil Blackwell, 1985)
- Samuel Beckett: Repetition, Theory and Text (Oxford: Basil Blackwell, 1988)
- Postmodernist Culture: An Introduction to Theories of the Contemporary (1989) 2nd, revised and enlarged edn (Oxford: Blackwell, 1996)
- Theory and Cultural Value (1992)
- The English Novel in History 1950–1995 (1995)
- James Joyce (Exeter: Northcote House, 1996)
- Dumbstruck – A Cultural History of Ventriloquism (2000)
- The Book of Skin (2003)
- Fly (London: Reaktion, 2006)
- The Matter of Air: Science and Art of the Ethereal (London: Reaktion, 2010)
- Paraphernalia: The Curious Lives of Magical Things (London: Profile, 2011)
- A Philosophy of Sport (London: Reaktion, 2011)
- Beyond Words: Sobs, Hums, Stutters and Other Vocalizations (London: Reaktion, 2014)
- Beckett, Modernism and the Material Imagination (Cambridge: Cambridge University Press, 2014)
- Living By Numbers: In Defence of Quantity (London: Reaktion, 2016)
- Dream Machines (London: Open Humanities Press, 2017)
- The Madness of Knowledge: On Wisdom, Ignorance and Fantasies of Knowing (London: Reaktion, 2019)
- Giving Way: Thoughts on Unappreciated Dispositions (Stanford: Stanford University Press, 2019)
- A History of Asking (London: Open Humanities Press, 2023)
- Dreamwork: Why All Work Is Imaginary (London: Reaktion, 2023)
- Styles of Seriousness (Stanford: Stanford University Press, 2023)
- Gaston Bachelard: An Intellectual Biography (London: Reaktion, 2025)
- Exorbitance: A Grammar of Overdoing (Stanford: Stanford University Press, 2026)

=== Edited Books ===
- Samuel Beckett’s `Waiting for Godot’ and `Endgame': A New Casebook (Basingstoke: Macmillan, 1992)
- Charles Dickens, Oliver Twist, (`Everyman Dickens’, London: Dent, 1994)
- Charles Dickens, The Mystery of Edwin Drood (`Everyman Dickens’, London: Dent, 1996)
- Charles Dickens (London: Longman ‘Critical Readers’, 1996).
- (with Daniela Caselli and Laura Salisbury) Other Becketts (Tallahassee: Journal of Beckett Studies Books, 2002)
- The Cambridge Companion to Postmodernism (Cambridge: Cambridge University Press, 2004)
- Samuel Beckett, The Unnamable (London: Faber, 2010)

=== Essays 2020-present ===
- ‘In Public’, in Further Reading, ed. Matthew Rubery and Leah Price (Oxford: Oxford University Press, 2020), pp. 51-61.
- ‘Admiring the Nothing of It: Shakespeare and the Senseless’, in Shakespeare/Sense: Contemporary Readings in Sensory Culture, ed. Simon Smith (London: Bloomsbury 2020), pp. 40-61.
- ‘Datelines’, in The Palgrave Handbook of Mathematics and Literature, ed. Alice Jenkins, Robert Tubbs and Nina Engelhardt (Cham: Palgrave Macmillan, 2021), pp. 513-28.
- ‘Scaphander’, in Extinct: A Compendium of Obsolete Objects, ed. Barbara Penner, Adrian Forty, Olivia Horsfall Turner and Miranda Critchley (London: Reaktion, 2021), pp. 277-9.
- ‘Terry Eagleton’s Divine Comedy‘, Theory Now, 5 (2022), 82-98.
- ‘Consorting‘, Critical Quarterly, 64 (2022), 14-19.
- ‘Asphyxiations’, SubStance, 52 (2023), 74-8.
- 'Afterword', in Laura Marcus, Rhythmical Subjects: The Measures of the Modern (Oxford: Oxford University Press, 2023), pp. 309-14.
- 'Michel Serres and Glory', Angelaki: Journal of the Theoretical Humanities, 29 (2024), 127-36.
- 'Dissolving the People: Acts of Assembly and Invocation', in ‘The People’ and British Literature: Belonging, Exclusion, and Democracy, ed. Benjamin Kohlmann and Matthew Taunton (Cambridge: Cambridge University Press, 2025), pp. 225-37.
- 'The Wishes of Human Vanity', Critical Quarterly, 68 (2026), 1-10.
