= John Neville Figgis =

English historian and philosopher (1866–1919)

The Reverend John Neville Figgis CR
- Born: 2 October 1866; Brighton, England
- Died: 13 April 1919 (aged 52); Virginia Water, England
- Other names: J. N. Figgis; Neville Figgis

Ecclesiastical career
- Religion: Christianity (Anglican)
- Church: Church of England
- Ordained: 1894 (deacon); 1895 (priest)

Scholarly background
- Education: St Catharine's College, Cambridge
- Influences: Lord Acton; Mandell Creighton; Otto von Gierke; Frederic William Maitland; Albert Schweitzer

Scholarly work
- Discipline: History; philosophy; theology
- Sub-discipline: Intellectual history; political philosophy
- School or tradition: Cambridge School; liberal Anglo-Catholicism; pluralism
- Influenced: G. D. H. Cole; Paul Hirst; Harold Laski; David Nicholls; Maurice Reckitt; William Temple; Lionel S. Thornton; Rowan Williams

John Neville Figgis CR (2 October 1866 – 13 April 1919) was an English historian, political philosopher, and Anglican priest and monk of the Community of the Resurrection.

== Life ==
He was born in Brighton on 2 October 1866. Educated at Brighton College and St Catharine's College, Cambridge, he was a student of Lord Acton at Cambridge, and editor of much of Acton's work.

He is remembered in relation to the history of ideas and concepts of the pluralist state. The latter he in some ways adapted from Otto von Gierke; his ideas were picked up by others, such as G. D. H. Cole and Harold Laski. Some of the books which belonged to Figgis form part of the Mirfield Collection which is housed in the University of York Special Collections.

He was professed in the Community of the Resurrection at Mirfield in 1909. He died on 13 April 1919 in Virginia Water.

== Works ==
- The Divine Right of Kings (1896), second edition 1914
- Christianity and History (1905)
- Studies of Political Thought from Gerson to Grotius, 1414–1625 (1907) Birkbeck Lectures, 1900
- The Gospel and Human Needs (1909) Hulsean Lectures
- Religion and English Society (1911)
- Civilisation at the Cross Roads (1912)
- Antichrist and Other Sermons (1913)
- Churches in the Modern State (1913)
- The Fellowship of the Mystery (1914) Bishop Paddock Lectures
- The Will to Freedom: or, The Gospel of Nietzsche and the Gospel of Christ (1917)
- Some Defects of English Religion (1917)
- Hopes for English Religion (1919)
- The Political Aspects of S. Augustine's City of God (1921)

Academic offices
Preceded by Howard Masterman	Hulsean Lecturer; 1908	Succeeded by W. Edward Chadwick
