= Globalization in Question =

1996 text by Paul Hirst, Grahame Thompson and Simon Bromley

Globalization in Question: The International Economy and the Possibilities of Governance
- Title page for Globalization in Question: The International Economy and the Possibilities of Governance (1996)
- Author: Paul Hirst; Grahame Thompson; Simon Bromley
- Language: English
- Genre: Non-fiction
- Publisher: Polity Press
- Publication date: 1996

Globalization in Question: The International Economy and the Possibilities of Governance is a text on globalization by Paul Hirst, Grahame Thompson and Simon Bromley, published in 1996 by Polity Press.

== Background ==
Hirst and Thompson note that globalization is an important topic, not only in economics, but also in the social, political and managerial sciences. There is much talk of the "global village" and it is often argued that a truly global economy has emerged, or is in the process of emerging. This global economy, it is further argued, in what might be termed the "globalization hypothesis", has made domestic economic strategies useless in the face of the world market, in which a new breed of truly transnational corporations are the dominant actors. The authors question the extent to which this globalization hypothesis is an accurate portrayal of how things actually are, and whether this is how they ought to be. There is a strong polemical element to the book.

== Five important criticisms of the globalisation hypothesis ==
The authors argue on the basis of the following five interrelated points:

1. Those advancing the globalization thesis do not provide a coherent concept of the world economy in which supranational forces and agents are decisive.
2. Pointing to evidence of the enhanced internationalization of economic relationships since the 1970s is not in itself proof of the emergence of a distinctly global economic structure.
3. The international economy has been subject to major structural changes in the last century, and there have been earlier periods of internationalisation of trade, capital flows and the monetary system, especially from 1870 to 1914.
4. There are very few truly global transnational corporations (TNCs). Most so-called TNCs are really only multinational corporations that continue to operate from distinct national bases.
5. The prospects for regulation by international cooperation, the formation of trading blocs, and the development of new national strategies that take account of internationalization are by no means exhausted.

== Five important major characteristics of the international economy ==
Having criticized a strong version of the globalization thesis, Hirst and Thompson identify five major characteristics of the international economy that they wish to emphasize.

1. The most important economic (and other) relationships are still those between the most developed market economies.
2. There has been a progressive internationalization of money and capital markets since the 1970s.
3. There has been an increasing volume of trade in semi-manufactured and manufactured goods between the industrialized economies.
4. There has been a progressive development of internationalized (not "globalized") companies.
5. The formation of supranational trading blocs has advanced considerably in recent years.

== Conclusion ==
Kiani and Schofield ask whether the globalization hypothesis is overstated, or is it the case that we are really in a new stage in international economic, political and cultural relationships. In doing so, they trace out the present configuration of international economic, political and cultural tendencies. They look at the implications of these developments for policy and for the likely future direction of development. They stress, as the title suggests, the importance of "governance", and the ways in which nation states and international governance might interact with the processes at work. Their aim is to provide a rebuttal to the arguments of those who think that global market forces either should be obeyed, or cannot but be obeyed. Their conclusion is that "there are still opportunities for the development of governance mechanisms at the level of the international economy that neither undermine national governance nor hinder the creation of national strategies for international control".

== Reviews ==
- "Questioning Globalization - Globalization in Question: The International Economy and the Possibilities of Governance" by William K. Tabb, Monthly Review, (October 2001)
- "Globaloney?" by Susan Strange, Review of International Political Economy, Vol. 5, No. 4 (Winter, 1998), pp. 704–711
- "Globalization and the Myth of the Powerless State" by Linda Weiss, New Left Review, Vol. a, (1997)
- "Globalization in Question: The International Economy and the Possibilities of Governance. Paul Hirst, Grahame Thompson" by Roland Robertson, American Journal of Sociology, Vol. 102, No. 4, (1997)
