= The Regis School =

Location
- Westloats Lane; Bognor Regis, West Sussex, PO21 5LH; England; 50.79376°N 0.6908°W

Information
- Type: Academy
- Motto: The Best in Everyone
- Local authority: West Sussex
- Trust: United Learning
- Department for Education URN: 137782 Tables
- Ofsted: Reports
- Chair of Governors: Diane Wilson
- Principal: David Oakes
- Gender: Co-educational
- Age: 11 to 18
- Enrolment: 1553
- Houses: Acropolis, Amazon, Everest, Pyramids, Sequoia, Uluru
- Website: http://www.theregisschool.co.uk

The Regis School (previously Bognor Regis Community College) is a co-educational secondary school and sixth form located in Bognor Regis, West Sussex, England.

== History ==
The school was previously called Bognor Regis School and was the first comprehensive school in the area. It was formed in 1967 by the amalgamation of Bognor Regis Grammar School (Pevensey Road) and William Fletcher Secondary Modern School (Westcoats Lane). It was renamed Bognor Regis Community College in 1985.

The school was located on two separate sites until September 2010 when new school buildings were constructed as part of the Building Schools for the Future programme. The older buildings were demolished.

Previously a community school administered by West Sussex County Council, in January 2012 The Regis School converted to academy status and is now sponsored by United Learning.

On 31 October – 1 November 2017 the school was inspected by Ofsted. The findings were published on 24 November which showed the school was rated 'Good' by Ofsted with Leadership and Management, as well as Personal Development and Welfare, judged as 'Outstanding'.

On 7–8 March 2023 the school was inspected by Ofsted. In the section 8 ungraded inspection, the school maintained its "Good" rating, with inspections mentioning that exam results, at both GCSE and A-level, had improved since their last visit. In terms of areas that the school needed to work on, it was mentioned that "the curriculum is not yet securely embedded".

== Notable former pupils and teachers ==
- Jim Howick, comic actor (Peep Show, Ghosts)
- Jana Bennett, OBE, Director of BBC Television.
- Julian Rathbone, Head of English, Booker Prize short listings in 1976 and 1979.
- Danny Mac, Actor and Musical Theatre performer.
