= Lesley A. Jacobs =

Canadian legal scholar and academic

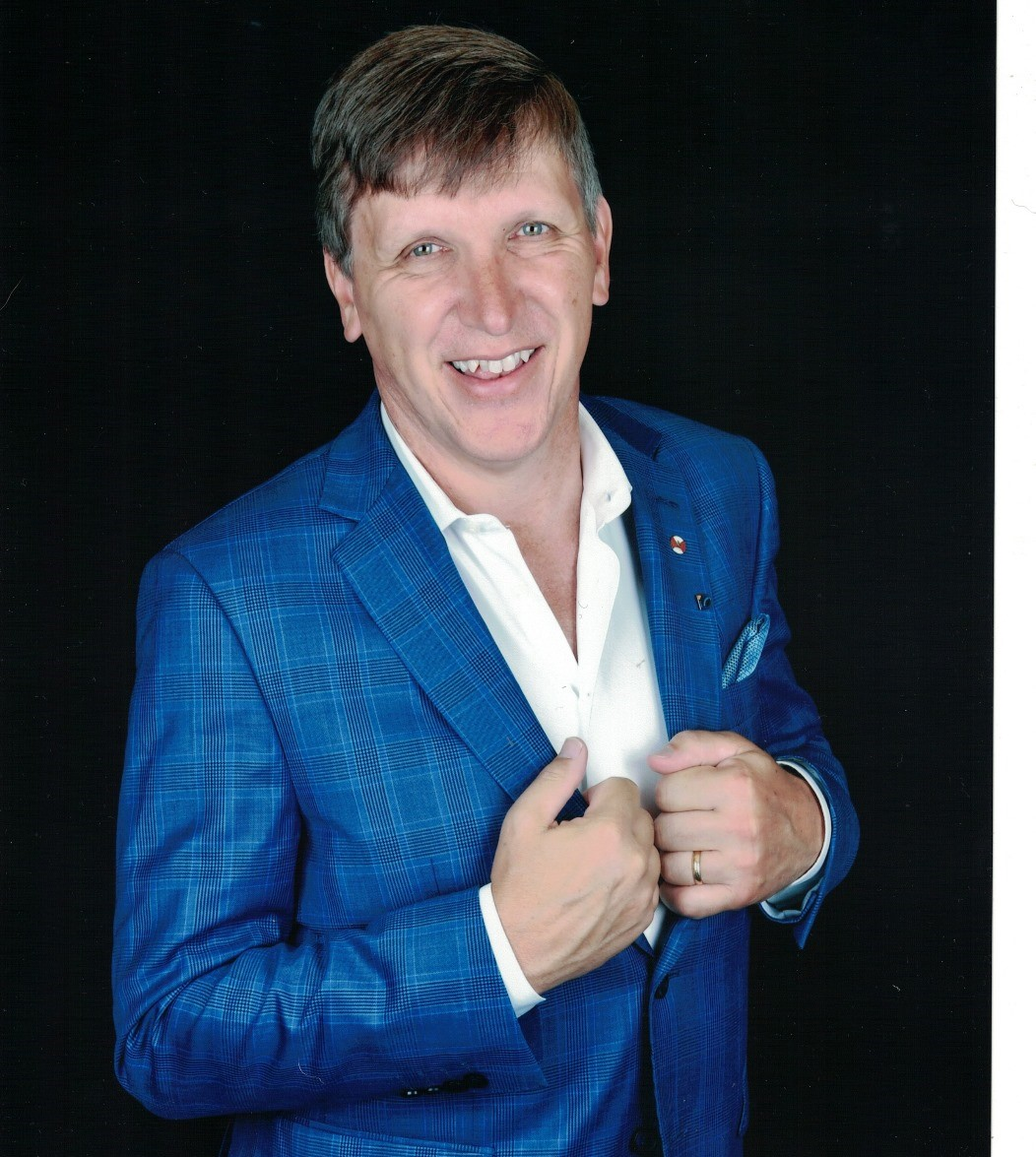

Academic background
- Education: University of Western Ontario; University of Oxford; Harvard Law School; University of Toronto

Academic work
- Discipline: Law and Politics
- Sub-discipline: Human Rights and Legal Theory
- Institutions: York University; Ontario Tech University
- Notable works: Pursuing Equal Opportunities (Cambridge University Press)

Lesley Jacobs is a Canadian academic, legal scholar, and senior university administrator specializing in human rights, access to justice, and data science applications in social policy. He is a professor emeritus at York University.

He is a Fellow of the Royal Society of Canada, and has served as vice president of Research and Innovation at Ontario Tech University since 2019, where he directs Canada's first International Atomic Energy Agency (IAEA) Collaborating Centre. His interdisciplinary law and social science research combines empirical data science with policy analysis, particularly in anti-racism, policing, and equality of opportunity.

== Education and career ==
Jacobs earned his Bachelor of Arts with a Gold Medal in 1985 and Master of Arts in 1986 in Political Science and Philosophy from the University of Western Ontario. He completed his Doctor of Philosophy (DPhil) in Politics at the University of Oxford in 1990 under the supervision of political philosopher Gerald A. Cohen, with mentorship from legal scholars Ronald Dworkin and Geoffrey Marshall.

Jacobs began his academic career as a lecturer at Magdalen College, Oxford from 1989 to 1990, followed by appointments at the University of British Columbia from 1990 to 1993 and York University from 1993 to 2019. He was the Director of the Institute for Social Research, founding Director of the York Centre for Public Policy and Law, and York Research Chair in Human Rights and Access to Justice.

Since 2019, Jacobs is a Vice-President of Research and Innovation at Ontario Tech University. He spearheaded partnerships such as the university's role as an academic build partner for Project Arrow (Canada's first all-electric concept vehicle) and established organized research units like the Brilliant Energy Institute and the Automotive Centre of Excellence.

He is a corporate director for three technology firms and contributes to IAEA initiatives on nuclear energy governance.

== Research ==
Jacobs’ scholarship bridges legal theory, data science, and public policy. He developed race data collection frameworks embedded in Ontario’s Anti-Racism Act, 2017, and Nova Scotia's Dismantling Racism and Hate Act, 2022. His empirical studies on racial profiling in policing, including landmark projects with the Ottawa, Peel, and Toronto police services, have informed Canadian jurisprudence and human rights policy.

He pioneered using randomized control trials (RCTs) in legal services research through collaborations with Community Legal Education Ontario (CLEO).

His theoretical contributions include frameworks for balancing competing human rights claims (adopted by the Ontario Human Rights Commission) and critiques of post-liberal jurisprudence. His research has been cited in Supreme Court decisions, including Ligue des Noirs du Québec v. City of Montréal (2024) and Attorney General of Quebec v. Luamba (2024).

== Selected publications ==
=== Books ===
- Foster, Lorne Preston; Jacobs, Lesley (2017). "Inclusive Workplace Practice in Canada: Competing Equalities in an Industrial-Mobile Society". SSRN Electronic Journal. doi:10.2139/ssrn.3027580. ISSN 1556-5068.
- Jacobs, Lesley A.; McManus, Matthew (2023), "Reading Dworkin Against Post-Liberal Justice", Palgrave Studies in Classical Liberalism, Cham: Springer International Publishing, pp. 105–121, doi:10.1007/978-3-031-45347-2_7, ISBN 978-3-031-45346-5
- Jacobs, Lesley A.; Wada, Yoshitaka; Vertinsky, Ilan, eds. (2023-02-01). Global Health Security in China, Japan, and India. University of British Columbia Press. doi:10.59962/9780774867726. ISBN 978-0-7748-6772-6.
- Humphrey, John (1970). "Human Rights and Authority". The University of Toronto Law Journal. 20 (4): 412–421. doi:10.2307/824883. ISSN 0042-0220. JSTOR 824883.
- Drache, Daniel; Jacobs, Lesley A. (2014-03-20), "Introduction: Emerging Policy Spaces During Global Economic Crises", Linking Global Trade and Human Rights, Cambridge University Press, pp. 1–24, doi:10.1017/cbo9781107238985.001, ISBN 978-1-107-23898-5
- Voorhoeve, Alex (2005). "Pursuing Equal Opportunities: The Theory and Practice of Egalitarian Justice, by Lesley A. Jacobs. Cambridge University Press, 2004, xiv + 280 pages". Economics and Philosophy. 21 (1): 155–160. doi:10.1017/s0266267104250519. ISSN 0266-2671.
- Tapley, Edward L. (1997). "A Review of "Prentice Hall's Environmental Technology Series Volume 3: Health Effects of Hazardous Materials"". American Industrial Hygiene Association Journal. 58 (5): 383. doi:10.1080/00028894.1997.10399295. ISSN 0002-8894.
- Jacobs, Lesley A (1993-08-12). Rights And Deprivation. Oxford University PressOxford. doi:10.1093/oso/9780198277675.001.0001. ISBN 978-0-19-827767-5.
- Drache, Daniel; Jacobs, Lesley A., eds. (2018-10-15). Grey Zones in International Economic Law and Global Governance. University of British Columbia Press. doi:10.59962/9780774838559. ISBN 978-0-7748-3855-9.
- Jacobs, Lesley; Laselva, Samuel V. (1999). "The Moral Foundations of Canadian Federalism: Paradoxes, Achievements, and Tragedies of Nationhood". The University of Toronto Law Journal. 49 (2): 295. doi:10.2307/826022. ISSN 0042-0220. JSTOR 826022.

=== Journal articles and book Chapters ===
- Foster, Lorne Preston; Jacobs, Lesley (2017). "Inclusive Workplace Practice in Canada: Competing Equalities in an Industrial-Mobile Society". SSRN Electronic Journal. doi:10.2139/ssrn.3027580. ISSN 1556-5068.
- Farrow, Trevor C.W.; Jacobs, Lesley A. (2020-09-01), "Introduction", The Justice Crisis, University of British Columbia Press, pp. 3–22, doi:10.59962/9780774863599-005, ISBN 978-0-7748-6359-9
- Jacobs, Lesley A. (2019-10-01), "Corporate Legal Consciousness in Investor-State Dispute Settlement and the United Nations' Responsibility to Respect Human Rights", Good Governance in Economic Development, University of British Columbia Press, pp. 92–111, doi:10.59962/9780774861946-006, ISBN 978-0-7748-6194-6
- Jacobs, Lesley A. (2019-06-28), "Health and human rights performance in China: stronger on entitlements, weaker on freedoms", Handbook on Human Rights in China, Edward Elgar Publishing, doi:10.4337/9781786433688.00017, ISBN 978-1-78643-368-8
- Jacobs, Lesley A. (2018-10-15), "Investor-State Dispute Settlement Mechanisms in International Economic Law", Grey Zones in International Economic Law and Global Governance, University of British Columbia Press, pp. 68–90, doi:10.59962/9780774838559-008, ISBN 978-0-7748-3855-9
- Jacobs, Lesley A. (2016). "Dealing fairly with winners and losers in school: Reframing how to think about equality of educational opportunity 50 years after the Coleman Report". Theory and Research in Education. 14 (3): 313–332. doi:10.1177/1477878516680409. ISSN 1477-8785.
