= Sound Diplomacy =

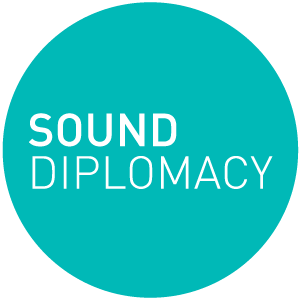
- Company type: Private
- Industry: Consulting
- Founded: 2013
- Headquarters: Barcelona, Berlin, Wilmington, Delaware, London,, United Kingdom, Germany, Spain
- Services: Music and Cultural Strategy
- Website: www.sounddiplomacy.com

Sound Diplomacy is an international consultancy focused on music, culture, and the creative economy. The organisation conducts research and analysis to evaluate the economic and social contributions of the creative industries and provides strategic planning for cities, regions, and communities. Its work includes cultural infrastructure development, policy research, and economic impact assessments.

The consultancy operates across both public and private sectors, advising governments, municipalities, international organisations, and industry stakeholders in real estate, investment, and cultural policy. Since its establishment, Sound Diplomacy has worked with clients in more than 30 countries.

Founded in London in May 2013 by Shain Shapiro Ph.D. and the former UK head of Catalan! Arts Jordi Puy, the company has since expanded to have offices and operations in Barcelona, Berlin, Halifax, Delaware, London

== History ==
Sound Diplomacy launched with clients including CIMA, HootSuite, ICEC and Osheaga MEG Pro. In October 2013, Sound Diplomacy partnered with Martin Elbourne and Spanish promoter Xavi Manresa to launch a new boutique showcase in Catalonia, 'Lleida Sessions Pro'.

Also in October 2013, Sound Diplomacy reached an agreement to represent the Spanish music conference 'Bizkaia International Music Experience (BIME)' in countries such as UK, Canada, Australia, South Africa, Colombia and Uruguay. In November 2013, Sound Diplomacy established a partnership with Nouvelle Prague, a showcase festival that takes place in Prague, Czech Republic.

In 2015, Sound Diplomacy organised the first Music Cities Convention and subsequently founded Music Cities Events. This led to the development of the concept of ‘Music Cities’ and the purposeful linking of music to cities and planning policy, which has since formed the basis of much of Sound Diplomacy's research and work.

From 2016 through to 2018, Sound Diplomacy worked with the United Nations Industrial Development Organisation to produce a development strategy for the Cuban Music Industry, the first of its kind for the United Nations. Following this work, Havana was named a UNESCO City of Music in 2019.

In 2018, Sound Diplomacy delivered the first ever music focused panel at the United Nations World Urban Forum, outlining how music is an effective tool in delivering the UN's Strategic Development Goals. In November of the same year, a white paper co-written by Sound Diplomacy and Pro Colombia (commissioned by the United Nations World Travel Organisation) was launched at the World Travel Market in London. The white paper outlines how destinations around the world can use music tourism strategies to drive profile, visitors and associated revenues.

Also in 2018 Sound Diplomacy launched its first music audit and strategy in Huntsville, Alabama. The work inspired the recruitment of a full-time Music Officer position with the City of Huntsville and the establishment of a nine-member music Board. It also confirmed the development of the ‘Huntsville Amphitheatre’ which is due to open in May 2022.

In March 2019, Sound Diplomacy announced its expansion into the United States of America with the opening of an office in New Orleans. As part of this, Sound Diplomacy was tasked with conducting an economic music impact assessment for the newly launched New Orleans Music Economy initiative.

In September 2021, Sound Diplomacy announced its expansion into Latin America with the opening of an office in San José, Costa Rica, in partnership with real estate development and research firms PRIME and PRIME IQ. The first project in the Latin American region has been commissioned by Two Way Stadiums and UMusic Hotels.
