= Richard Humphreys (writer) =

British writer (1953–2025)

Richard Stephen Humphreys (2 September 1953 – 26 October 2025) was a British writer. He was the Curator of Programme Research at Tate Britain and Deputy Chairman of the London Consortium, of which he was a founding member. He was the author of a number of books, including Wyndham Lewis (London: Tate Publishing, 2004), and was editor of the Tate's British Artists series.

== Life and career ==
Humphreys was born in Cambridge on 2 September 1953. He studied English at Sidney Sussex College, Cambridge (1972–1975), and later authored a history of the college (Sidney Sussex College: A History, 2009). He also studied Art History at the Courtauld Institute (1975–1981).

He worked at the Tate Britain from 1981 to 2008 as a curator, and acted as Head of Education and Interpretation from 1991 to 2001.

In 1985, Humphreys was the lead curator of the Ezra Pound centenary exhibition Pound's Artists: Ezra Pound and the Visual Arts in London, Paris and Italy shown at Kettle's Yard and the Tate Gallery, and edited the accompanying volume of essays.

Humphreys died on 26 October 2025, at the age of 72.
