= Half the Picture =

2018 documentary film

- Film poster
- Directed by: Amy Adrion
- Produced by: Amy Adrion; Jude Harris (as David Harris)
- Cinematography: Yamit Shimonovitz; Soraya Sélène
- Edited by: Kate Hackett
- Production company: Leocadia Films
- Distributed by: Gravitas Ventures
- Release dates: January 23, 2018 (Sundance); June 8, 2018
- Running time: 94 minutes
- Country: United States
- Language: English

Half the Picture is a 2018 American documentary film by Amy Adrion about women directors in Hollywood and the struggles they face. It premiered at the 2018 Sundance Film Festival and was given a limited release in theaters on June 8, 2018.

== Interviewed for this film ==
- Stacy Smith of the USC Annenberg Inclusion Initiative
- Martha Lauzen of San Diego State University
- Ava DuVernay
- Mary Harron
- Penelope Spheeris
- Catherine Hardwicke
- Brenda Chapman
- Miranda July
- Lena Dunham
- Martha Coolidge
- Kimberly Peirce

== Reception ==
The film earned acclaim for its personal approach regarding how women directors navigate Hollywood sexism, centering stories from women directors themselves.

On the review aggregator website Rotten Tomatoes, 100% of 21 critics' reviews are positive, with an average rating of 8.5/10. Metacritic, which uses a weighted average, assigned the film a score of 76 out of 100, based on five critics, indicating "generally favorable" reviews.

Susan Wloszczyna of RogerEbert.com gave the film three out of four stars and wrote, "Documentaries that rely on a steady stream of talking heads—interspersed here with fleeting film clips—usually are not my favorite. However, when those heads belong to talented and perceptive women who rarely get a chance to speak their minds let alone get hired to make a movie, I can definitely make an exception."

== See also ==
- Brainwashed: Sex-Camera-Power - Nina Menkes's 2022 documentary similar in content
