= Male gaze =

Concept in feminist theory

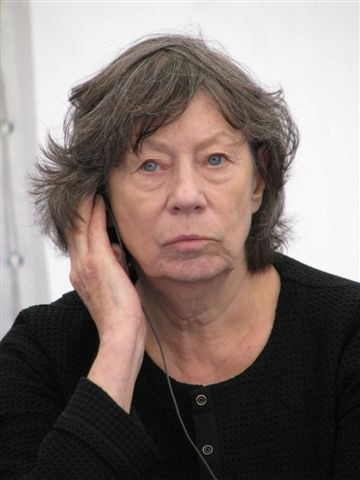
In the essay "Visual Pleasure and Narrative Cinema" (1975), Laura Mulvey (pictured) introduced and described the mechanics of the male gaze.

In feminist theory, the male gaze is the act of depicting women and the world in the visual arts and in literature from a masculine, heterosexual perspective that presents and represents women as sexual objects for the pleasure of the heterosexual male viewer.

The concept was first introduced by art historian John Berger, in his work Ways of Seeing (1972), which highlighted how traditional Western art positioned women as objects of male viewers' gazes, reinforcing a patriarchal visual narrative. It was further articulated by British feminist film theorist Laura Mulvey in her 1975 essay, "Visual Pleasure and Narrative Cinema". Mulvey's theory draws on historical precedents, such as the depiction of women in European oil paintings from the Renaissance period.

In the visual and aesthetic presentations of narrative cinema, the male gaze has three perspectives: that of the man behind the camera, that of the male characters within the film's cinematic representations, and that of the spectator gazing at the image.

Concerning the psychologic applications and functions of the gaze, the male gaze is conceptually contrasted with the female gaze.

== Background ==
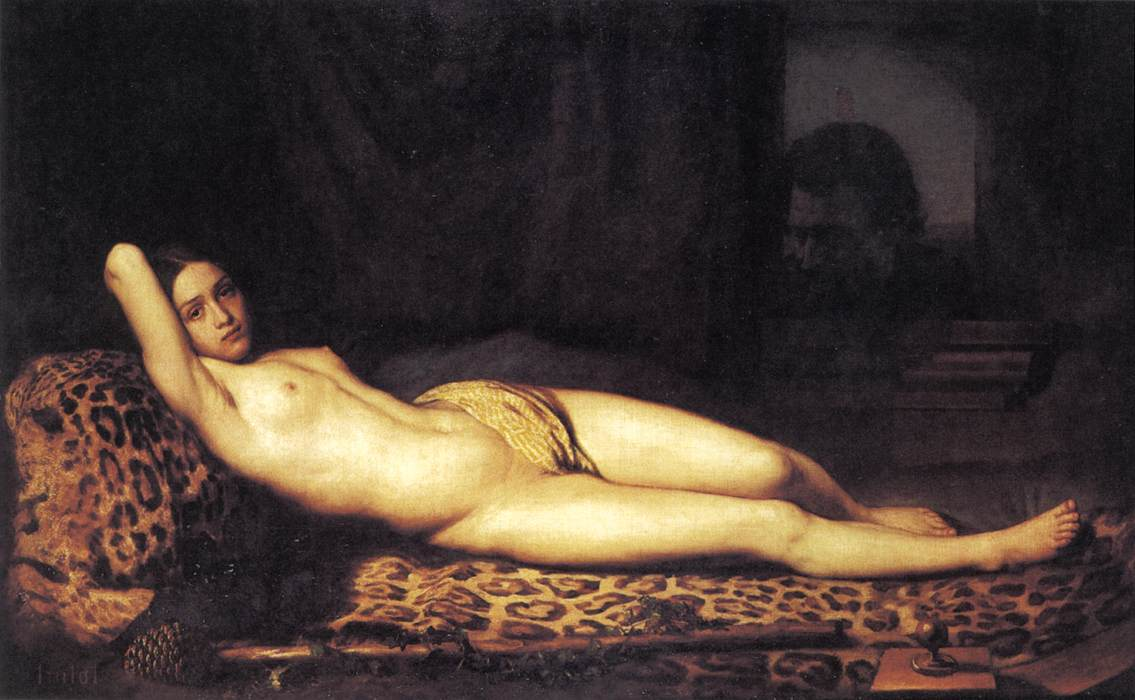
Nude Girl on a Panther Skin (1844) by Félix Trutat shows a reclining nude woman being watched by a disproportionately large male face at the window of her bedroom; the painting "powerfully exemplifie[s]" the concept of the male gaze.

The existentialist philosopher Jean-Paul Sartre introduced the concept of the gaze (Note: French: Le regard) in his 1943 book Being and Nothingness; the idea is that the act of gazing at another human being creates a subjective power difference, which is felt both by the "gazer" and by the "gazed", because the person being gazed at is objectified—perceived as an object, not as a human being. In Laura Mulvey's 1975 essay "Visual Pleasure and Narrative Cinema", she presents, explains, and develops the cinematic concept of the male gaze. Mulvey proposes that sexual inequality—the asymmetry of social and political power between men and women—is a controlling social force in the cinematic representations of women and men. The male gaze (the aesthetic pleasure of the male viewer) is a social construct derived from the ideologies and discourses of patriarchy.

In the fields of media studies and feminist film theory, the male gaze is conceptually related to the behaviors of voyeurism (looking as sexual pleasure), scopophilia (pleasure from looking), and narcissism (pleasure from contemplating one's self). Parting from the Freudian concept of male castration anxiety, Mulvey said that because the woman does not have a penis, her female presence provokes sexual insecurity in the unconscious of the male, wherein women are passive recipients of male objectification. The on-screen presence of a woman's body is notable, because "her lack of penis, [implies] a threat of castration and hence unpleasure", which the male gaze subverts through the over-sexualization of femininity. As the passive subjects and objects of the male gaze, the hypersexualization of women thwarts the man's castration anxiety with the sexual practises of voyeurism-sadism and fetishization of the female body. The practice of voyeurism-sadism is the "pleasure [that] lies in ascertaining guilt (immediately associated with castration), asserting control and subjecting the guilty person through punishment or forgiveness", which aligns more with the structure of narrative cinema than does the fetishization component of scopophilia. Psychologically, fetishistic scopophilia reduces the man's castration anxiety—induced by the presence of women—by fragmenting the woman's personality and hypersexualizing the parts of her body.

In narrative film, the visual perspective of the male gaze is the sight-line of the camera as the perspective of the spectator—a heterosexual man whose sight lingers upon the features of a woman's body. In narrative cinema, the male gaze usually displays the female character (woman, girl, child) on two levels of eroticism: as an erotic object of desire for the characters in the filmed story; and as an erotic object of desire for the male viewer (spectator) of the filmed story. Such visualizations establish the roles of the dominant male and dominated female, by representing the female as a passive object for the male gaze of the active viewer.

As an ideological basis of patriarchy, sociopolitical inequality is realized as a value system by which male-created institutions (e.g. the movie business, advertising, fashion) unilaterally determine what is "natural and normal" in society. In time, the people of a community believe that the artificial values of patriarchy, as a social system, are the "natural and normal" order of things in society because men look at women and women are looked at by men. The hierarchy of "inferior women" and "superior men" derives from misrepresenting men and women as sexual opponents, rather than as sexual equals.

== Concepts ==
=== Scopophilia ===
The Freudian concept of scopophilia produced two types of male gaze: the pleasure that is linked to sexual attraction (voyeurism in the extreme), and the scopophilic pleasure that is linked to narcissistic identification (the introjection of ego ideal), and each type of male gaze shows how women have been socially compelled to view the cinema from the perspectives (sexual, aesthetic, cultural) of the male gaze. In cinematic representations of women, the male gaze denies the woman's human agency and human identity to transform her from person to object—someone to be considered only for her beauty, physique, and sex appeal, as defined in the male sexual fantasy of narrative cinema.

=== Spectatorship ===
Two types of spectatorship occur while viewing a film, wherein the spectator consciously and unconsciously engages in the societally defined-and-assigned roles of men and women. Concerning phallocentrism, the spectator views a film from the perspectives of three different looks: the first look is that of the camera, which photographs and records the events of the filmed story; the second look describes the nearly voyeuristic act of the audience as they view the film proper; and the third look, which is that of the characters who interact with each other throughout the story.

The visual perspective common to the three types of look (camera, spectator, characters) is that the action of looking generally is perceived as the man's active role in the story, while being looked-at generally is perceived as the woman's passive role in the story. Based upon that patriarchal construction, the cinematic narrative presents and represents the women characters as objects of sexual desire possessed of a physical "appearance coded for strong visual and erotic impact" upon the male spectator. Therefore, in the narrative of the story (screenplay) the actress does not portray a female protagonist whose actions directly affect the outcome of the story or propel the plot. Instead of representing a female character with personal agency, the actress is in the film for the purpose of visually supporting the actor portraying the male protagonist, by her "bearing the burden of sexual objectification"—a condition psychologically unbearable for the actor, the character, and the story.

The condition of woman-as-passive-object of the male gaze is the link to scopophilia, the aesthetic pleasure derived from looking at someone as an object of beauty. Moreover, as an expression of human sexuality, scopophilia refers to the pleasure (sensual and sexual) derived from looking at sexual fetishes and photographs, pornography and naked bodies, etc.; sexual spectatorship is in two categories: voyeurism, wherein the viewer's pleasure is in looking at another person from a distance, and he or she projects fantasies, usually sexual, onto the gazed-upon person; and narcissism, wherein the viewer's pleasure is in self-recognition when viewing the image of another person. The bases of voyeurism and narcissism are in the concepts of the object libido and of the ego libido.

From the perspectives of male spectatorship, Mulvey said that in order for women to enjoy cinema, they must choose to identify with the male protagonist and assume his male-gaze perspective in looking at the world and at women. In the essay "If Her Stunning Beauty Doesn't Bring You to Your Knees, Her Deadly Drop-kick Will: Violent Women in Hong Kong Kung fu Film" (0000), the dramaturg Wendy Arons said that the hyper-sexualization of the bodies of female characters symbolically diminishes the threat of emasculation posed by violent women, hence: "The focus on the [woman's] body—as a body in an ostentatious display of breasts, legs, and buttocks—does mitigate the threat that women pose to 'the very fabric of . . . society', by reassuring the [male] viewer of his male privilege, as the possessor of the objectifying [male] gaze."

== Gazing at the nude woman ==
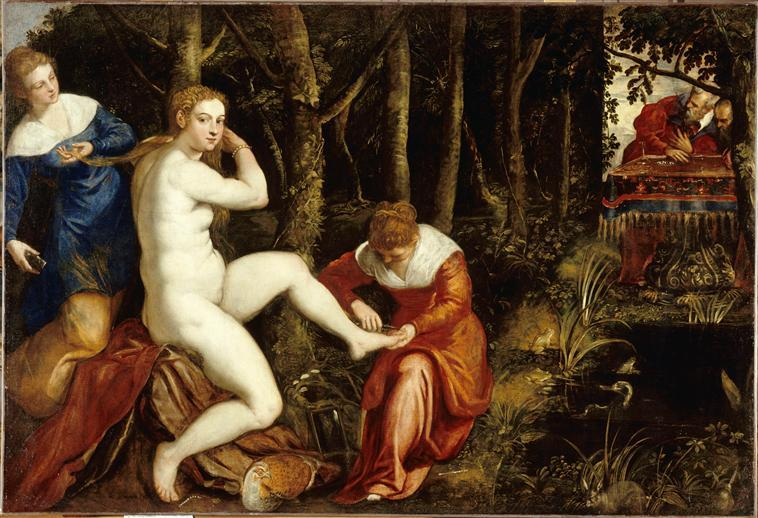
The male gaze: In the first version of Susanna and the Elders (1550–1560) Tintoretto shows Susanna directly looking at the spectator gazing at the painting of which she is the subject; aware of being looked at.

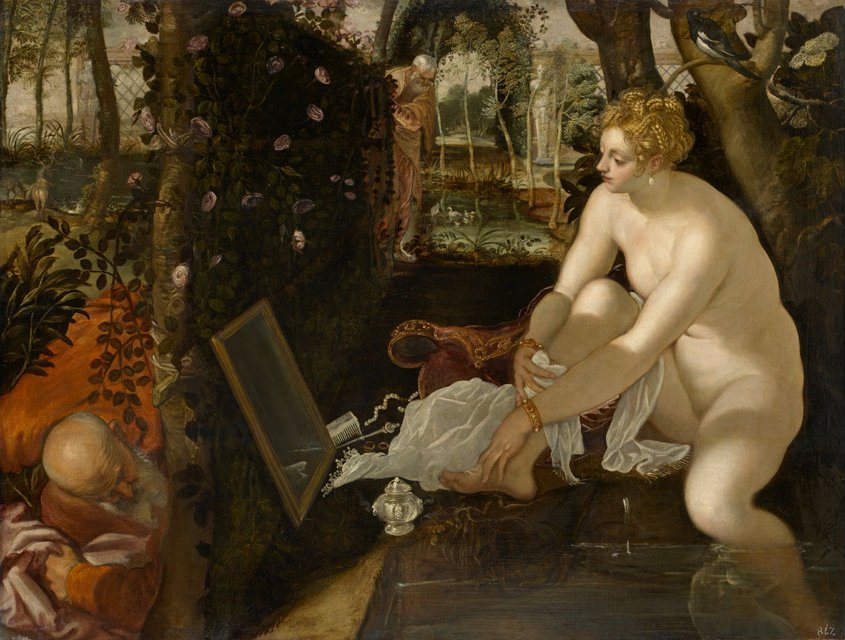
The male gaze: in the second version of Susanna and the Elders (1555–1556) Tintoretto shows Susannah gazing at herself in a mirror, and thus joins the two old men in their spectatorship of her person and her Self as an object.

In the television series and book Ways of Seeing (1972), the art critic John Berger used the term the male gaze to discuss and explain the sexual objectification of women in the arts and in advertising—by distinguishing that men look at and that women are looked at as the subject of an image, as a representation. Regarding the social function of art-as-spectacle, that men act and that women are acted-upon, accords with the social practices of spectatorship, which are determined by the aesthetic conventions of the artistic objectification of men and women, which artists have not transcended in their production of works of art.

In the genre of the Renaissance nude, the nude woman who is the subject of the painting is often depicted being aware that she is being observed, either by other people within the scene portrayed in the painting or by the spectator gazing at the painting. Berger analyzes the male-gaze perspectives of two Tintoretto paintings about Susanna and the Elders, a biblical story about a pretty woman falsely accused of adultery by two old men who discover each other spying on Susanna whilst she bathes. In the first painting, Susanna and the Elders (1550–1560), Susanna "looks back at us looking at her"; in the second painting, Susanna and the Elders (1555–1556), Susanna is looking at herself in a mirror, and thus joins the two old men and the spectator in looking at Susanna-as-spectacle. The male-gaze perspectives of Tintoretto's paintings represent Susanna as nonchalant at being gazed upon in her nudity, whereas the female-gaze perspective of the painting by Artemisia Gentileschi, Susanna and the Elders (1610), represents the bathing Susanna as greatly humiliated at being subjected to the male gaze of two old men—the elders of the community—whose voyeurism has sexually objectified Susanna in the private sphere of her life.

In the production of a work of art, the conventions of artistic representation connect the male-gaze objectification of women to Lacan's theory of social alienation: the psychological splitting that occurs from seeing oneself as one is and seeing one's self as an idealized representation. In Italian Renaissance painting, especially in the nude-woman genre, psychological splitting arises in the objectified woman from the condition of being both the spectator and the spectacle; social alienation arises from seeing herself through the gaze of the spectator.

== The Black Female Nude ==
In Lisa E. Farrington's "Reinventing Herself: The Black Female Nude", Farrington states that the European female nude has mostly been depicted as passive and complacent to a masculine gaze, or in special occasions has been depicted as sexually liberated and as a femme fatale that uses her sexuality to overpower men.

Farrington said that instead of perpetuating the gaze, women artists have the ability to reclaim dominance over their bodies by painting the female nude themselves. This counteracts the male artists who have traditionally painted women in the nude to assert their own sexual dominance over a woman subject. A woman painting a female nude completely flips the gaze because a female audience replaces the male audience.

When black women are shown in art, they are sexualized and put in submissive positions, like their white counterparts, but unlike their white counterparts black women also experience racialized bigotry. It also means black women are considered undesirable because they are not seen the same as other women who were depicted as the epitome of beauty in the art world.

== Effects of the male gaze ==
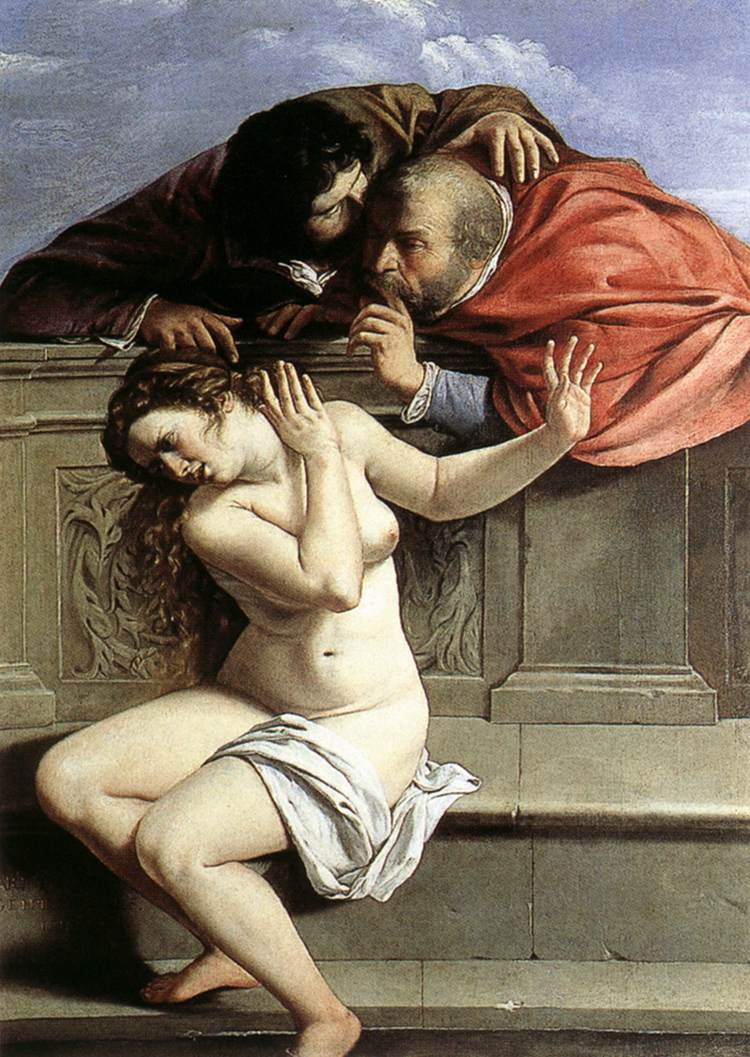
The female gaze: in the painting Susanna and the Elders (1610), Artemisia Gentileschi shows Susanna greatly distressed and humiliated at being sexually objectified by the male gaze of two elders of the community.

In Theorizing the Male Gaze: Some Problems (1989), researcher Edward Snow states that the concept of the male gaze has evolved into a theory of patriarchy, and that being subjected to the male gaze has negative psychological consequences upon the mental health of women, especially from the emotional and mental stresses of continually being expected to perform by and for men to the unrealistic standards of phallocentric masculinity. In comparison to the feelings of a man who anticipates being subjected to the female gaze, the woman's anticipation of being subjected to the male gaze increases her internal self-objectification, which induces feelings of body-shame and anxiety about her appearance.

In "Contextualizing Feminism: Gender, Ethnic and Class Divisions" (1983 Feminist Review), Floya Anthias and Nira Yuval-Davissay detail the way that the male gaze, in terms of the black female body, is based on class and gender divisions. To them, this concept is critical to unveiling the structure of oppression that the male gaze is built upon. Class divisions develop over time as ideologies are formed and reworked to reflect the current class system of an area. The influences of gender and racial divisions create the structure that separates different identities into separate groups. For that reason, black women will always have to deal with the gendered divisions that white women deal with, plus the racial oppression that black men face. Ethnic divisions are an important cross section that impact gender and class divisions.

Given the prevalence of the male gaze in a patriarchal society, the social conventions of conservative traditionalism implicitly teach girls and women how they are expected to behave when scrutinized by the male gaze. These social graces for girls include postural expectations, (Note: To stand straight and not slouch) to speak politely and not coarsely, and to groom and dress themselves in consideration of the opinions of other people. Failure to meet such standards of phallocentric masculinity is considered the personal fault of the individual girl or woman for not meeting the female ideal sought by the male gaze.

In A Test of Objectification Theory: The Effect of the Male Gaze on Appearance Concerns in College Women (2004), the researcher Rachel M. Calogero said that the male gaze can negatively affect the self-esteem of a woman and induce feelings of self-objectification that consequently lead to increased occurrences of feelings of body shame and poor mental health. For most women, a physical interaction with a man does not cause internalized feelings of self-objectification and subsequent negative mental state, but the anticipation of being dehumanized into a sexual object, by the male gaze, does cause internalized feelings of self-hatred.

== Theories of the gaze ==
=== Matrixial gaze ===
To address the psychological limitations of the male gaze, the philosopher Bracha Ettinger proposed the matrixial gaze, wherein the female gaze and the male gaze constitute each other from their lack of the other; Jacques Lacan's definition of the gaze. The matrixial gaze concerns trans-subjectivity and shareability based upon the feminine-matrixial-difference, which is produced by co-emergence by avoiding the phallic opposition of masculine–feminine. Parting from Lacan's later work, Ettinger's analyses the psychological structure of the Lacanian subject, whose deconstruction produces the feminine perspective by way of a shared matrixial gaze.

In the essay, "Is the Gaze Male?" (1983), E. Kaplan said that the male gaze constructs a false, hypersexualized feminine Other in order to dismiss the sensual feminine within every person innately connected to a maternal figure. That "the domination of women by the male gaze is part of men's strategy to contain the threat that the mother embodies, and to control the positive and negative impulses that memory traces of being mothered have left in the male unconsciousness."

That the mutual gaze, which seeks neither subordination nor domination of the gazer and the gazed-upon person, originates in the mother-child relationship, because Western culture is deeply committed to the ideas of "the masculine" and "the feminine" to demarcate differences between the sexes based upon the complex social apparatus of the gaze; and second, that said sexual demarcations are based upon patterns of dominance and submission. Such a demarcation of difference between the representations of the sexes privileges the male gaze (voyeurism and fetishism) because men's desires include the power of action, whereas the desires of women usually do not include the power of acting upon their desires.

=== Female gaze ===
Social inequality

Conceptually, the female gaze is like the male gaze, the action by which women view men and women, and themselves, from the perspective of a heterosexual man. The unequal social power of the male gaze is a conscious and subconscious effort to develop, establish, and maintain a sexual order of gender inequality in a patriarchal society. From either perspective of power, women are socially unequal. On the one hand, a woman who welcomes the sexual objectification of the male gaze might be perceived as conforming to sexist norms that only benefit men, thereby, the woman's welcoming sexist attention reinforces the social power of the male gaze to dehumanize women. However, the woman who accepts the sexual politics of the male gaze might be perceived as an exhibitionist advantageously using sexual objectification to profitably manipulate the sexist norms of patriarchy for social capital.

That the gaze dehumanizes women into objects of desire is a psychological component of male and female sexuality in Western culture; thus, "men do not simply look; [but] their gaze carries with it the power of action and of possession, which is lacking in the female gaze. Women receive and return a gaze, but cannot act upon it." In that light, "the sexualization and objectification of women is not simply for the purposes of eroticism; [because], from a psychoanalytic point of view, [the objectification] is designed to annihilate the threat that women pose". Despite their likeness, the male gaze and the female gaze possess unequal social power; in a patriarchy, the male gaze undermines the social equality of women into positions of gender inequality (subjectivity and submission).

Negating the female gaze

In the essay "Modernity and the Spaces for Femininity" (1988), the cultural analyst Griselda Pollock addresses the visual negation of the female gaze. Using the example of the photograph Sidelong Glance (1948), by Robert Doisneau, Pollock describes a middle-aged bourgeois couple viewing artworks in the display window of an art gallery. In the photograph, the spectator's perspective is from inside the art gallery. The couple are looking in directions different from the sight-line of the spectator. The woman is speaking to her husband about a painting at which she is gazing, whilst her distracted husband is gazing at a painting of a nude woman, which also is in view of the spectator. The woman is looking at an artwork not in view of the spectator. The man has found someone more interesting to gaze at, thus ignoring his wife's comment. Pollock's analysis of the Sidelong Glance photograph is that: "She [the wife] is contrasted, iconographically, to the naked woman. She is denied the picturing of her desire; what she looks at is blank for the spectator. She is denied being the object of desire, because she is represented as a woman who actively looks, rather than [as a woman passively] returning and confirming the gaze of the masculine spectator."

Scopophilia displaced

In "Watching the Detectives: The Enigma of the Female Gaze" (1989), Lorraine Gamman said that the difference between the female gaze and the male gaze is the displacement of scopophilia, which allows different perspectives because "the female gaze cohabits the space occupied by men, rather than being entirely divorced from it"; because the female gaze is not voyeuristic and so disrupts the phallocentric power of the male gaze.

Pursuit of the absent object

In the essay "Film and the Masquerade: Theorising the Female Spectator" (1999), Mary Ann Doane said that Freudian psychoanalysis discounted the importance of the female spectator because she is "too close to herself, entangled in her own enigma, she could not step back, could not achieve the necessary distance of a second look". That the voyeuristic gaze and the fetishistic gaze each are a "pleasurable transgression" of looking depends on the spectator's physical proximity to the person who is the spectacle. In creating space between the subject (the spectator) and the object (the cinema screen), the male gaze perpetuates an "infinite pursuit of an absent object". Such psychological distance—despite physical proximity—is denied to the female spectator because of the "masochism of over-identification or the narcissism entailed in becoming one's own object of desire"—the opposite of what Mulvey said prevented the cinematic objectification of men. Using the transvestite metaphor, Doane said that the female spectator has two options: to identify with the passive representation to which female characters are subjected by the cinematic male gaze, or to identify the masochistic representation of the male gaze as defiance of the patriarchal social assumptions that define femininity as "a closeness".

Hypermediacy

In "Networks of Remediation" (1999), Jay David Bolter and Richard Grusin said that Mulvey's theory of the male gaze coincides with "the desire for visual immediacy"—the erasure of the visual medium to facilitate the spectator's uninhibited interaction with the woman portrayed—defined in feminist film theory as the "male desire that takes an overt sexual meaning when the object of representation, and, therefore desire, is a woman." Bolter and Grusin proposed the term hypermediacy (directing the attention of the spectator to the visual medium and to the mediation inherent to a work of art) to be a form of the female gaze, because it "is multiple and deviant in its suggestion of multiplicity—a multiplicity of viewing positions, and a multiplicity of relationships, to the object in view, including sexual objects"; as a form of the female gaze, hypermediacy offers more and greater perspectives than the male gaze.

Feminization of the male gaze

In the essay, "Medusa and the Female Gaze" (1990), Susan Bowers explores the Medusa theory about the feminization of the male gaze, that women who assume the female gaze are societally perceived as psychologically dangerous women, because men both desire and fear the gaze that sexually objectifies a man in the way that the male gaze objectifies a woman. The Medusa theory proposes that the psychological phenomenon of being looked-at begins when the woman who notices that a man is gazing at her deconstructs and rejects his objectification of her. The important aspect of the male gaze is its subdued, unquestioned existence, which is disrupted by the female gaze when women acknowledge themselves as the object of the gaze, and reject such sexual subordination by objectifying the gazing man with their female gaze. Using the illustration Sex Murder on Ackerstrasse (1916–1917), by Georg Grosz, Bower's shows how "without a head, the woman in the drawing can threaten neither the man with her, nor the male spectator, with her own subjectivity. Her mutilated body is a symbol of how men have been able to deal with women by relegating them to visual objectivity". As such, just as in the Ancient Greek myth of the female gaze of Medusa, the male gaze requires the decapitation of the woman—symbolizing her capacity to wield the female gaze and objectify the male character—in order to subjugate the female gaze to the social norms of heteropatriarchy, which demarcates sexual roles as either masculine or feminine.

In the article "From Her Perspective" (2017), photographer and academic Farhat Basir Khan said that the female gaze is inherent to photographs taken by a woman, which is a perspective that negates the stereotypical male-gaze look inherent to "male-constructed" photographs, which, in the history of art, usually have presented and represented women as objects, rather than as persons.

=== Oppositional gaze ===
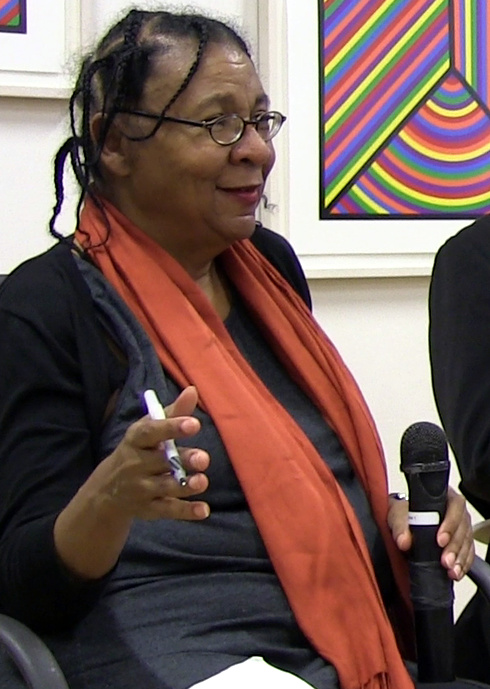
The oppositional gaze: The academic bell hooks developed male-gaze theory to account for the exclusion and invisibility of black women from the male gaze and idealized white womanhood.

In the essay "The Oppositional Gaze: Black Female Spectators" (1997), the academic bell hooks said that black women are placed outside the "pleasure in looking" (scopophilia) by being excluded as subjects of the male gaze. Beyond the exclusivity of the social signifiers of sex and sexuality as difference, through the theory of the oppositional gaze hooks said that the power in looking also is defined by racism. Parting from her interpretation of the essay "Visual Pleasure and Narrative Cinema" (1975), by Laura Mulvey, hooks said that "from a standpoint that acknowledges race, one sees clearly why black women spectators, [who are] not duped by mainstream cinema, would develop an oppositional gaze" to counter the male gaze. In relation to Lacan's mirror stage, during which a child develops the capacity for self-recognition, and thus the ego ideal, the oppositional gaze functions as a form of looking back, in search of the black female body within the cinematic idealization of white womanhood.

The black woman spectator identifies "with neither the phallocentric gaze nor the construction of white womanhood as lack [of the Other]", thus, "critical black female spectators construct a theory of looking relations where cinematic visual delight is the pleasure of interrogation", which originates from a negative emotional response to the cinematic representation of women that "denies the 'body' of the black female so as to perpetuate white supremacy and with it a phallocentric spectatorship where the woman to be looked-at and desired is white". Accounting for the social signifiers of difference that lie outside the exclusivity of perpetuated lines of sex-and-sexuality, hooks curated an organic pleasure in looking, which is not related to the scopophilia originally presented and explained in "Visual Pleasure and Narrative Cinema".

In the context of feminist theory, the absence of discussion of racial relations within the totalizing category [of] Women" is a sociological denial that refutes criticism that feminist film critics concern themselves only with the cinematic presentation and representation of white women. In the course of being interviewed by hooks, a working-class black woman said that "to see Black women in the position [that] white women have occupied in film forever" is to witness a transference without transformation; therefore, in the real world, the oppositional gaze includes intellectual resistance and understanding and awareness of the politics of race and of racism by way of cinematic whiteness, inclusive of the male gaze.

The use of sexual difference to justify discrimination towards women is comparable to how racist pseudo-science has been used in the argument black people are less than human. This establishes black women as biologically sub-human or as an object to means of sexual reproduction and sexual desire. Gender divisions are not backed by sexual reproduction as they were constructed as tools of patriarchal control and used to support that ideology. It is harder to approach racial and ethnic division in such a straightforward manner because of the lack of complete separation between groups; there is too much crossover due to influence of colonialism and migration.

The racial discrepancy continues into the Western feminist movement that has historically ignored and excluded black women, to the point where the separation of the terms 'feminism' and 'black feminism' had to be made to address the issues of black women (and other women of color) which were never addressed or supported by the white feminists. In white feminism, the term 'women" does not refer to women of all races but specifically to white, Eurocentric women; black women are grouped with black men and are not considered in this movement. Black feminism uniquely studies the intersection of race, gender and class. Though it was started as a way to focus on the scope of the overlooked black women, it can also leave women of color who are not black unaccounted for. Neither term is perfect to account for the struggles of all ethnic groups of women; feminism cannot be looked at as black versus white as that does not encompass the vast range of ethnic identities. That said, black feminism is the first account of feminism focusing on the oppression of women who do not fit into the Western beauty standard.

=== Queering the gaze ===
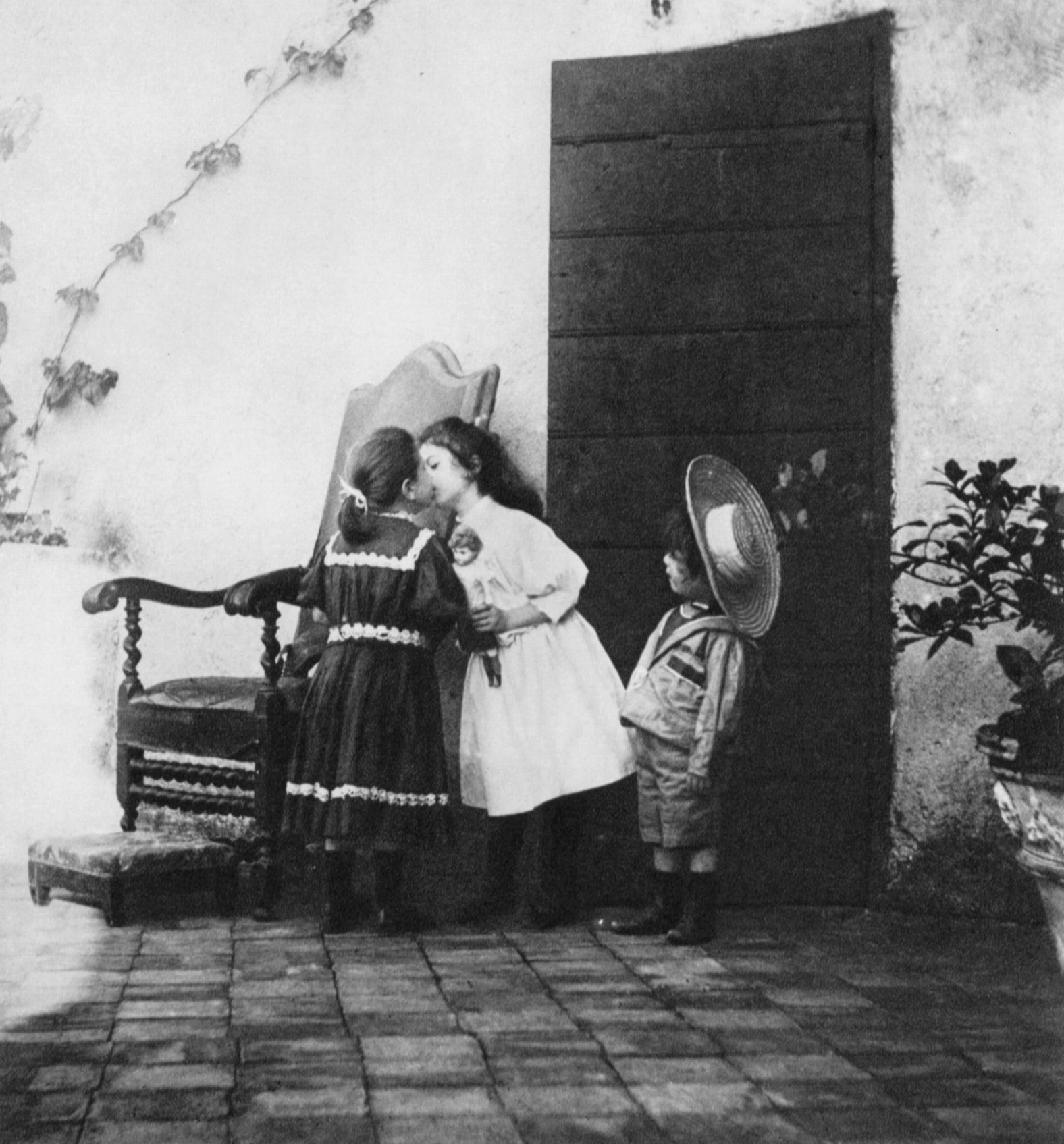
Photograph by Giuseppe Primoli: Two girls greet each other with a kiss; a boy looks on.

Most applications of male gaze theory have been about the social paradigm of heterosexual patriarchy: sexually exclusive relationships between men and women. In "Theorizing Mainstream Female Spectatorship: The Case of the Popular Lesbian Film" (1988), academic Karen Hollinger queered male-gaze theory to develop and explain the gaze of the lesbian woman, which is a mutual gaze between two women—neither of whom is the subject or the object of the lesbian gaze. In lesbian cinema, the absence of male-gaze social control voids the cultural hegemony of patriarchy; women are free to be themselves, personally and sexually. The theory of the lesbian gaze proposes that cinematic lesbians are "simultaneously both [the] subject and [the] object of the look, and consequently of female desire", which is communicated in the narrative ambiguity of lesbian cinema, wherein "the sexual orientation of [the story's] female characters is never made explicit, and viewers are left to read the [cinematic] text largely as they wish." Queering the male gaze eliminates the distinction between erotic love and Platonic love in relationships among women, because the narrative ambiguity of lesbian cinema thwarts the heterosexual fetishization of the sexual identity of lesbians.

=== Homoerotic gaze ===
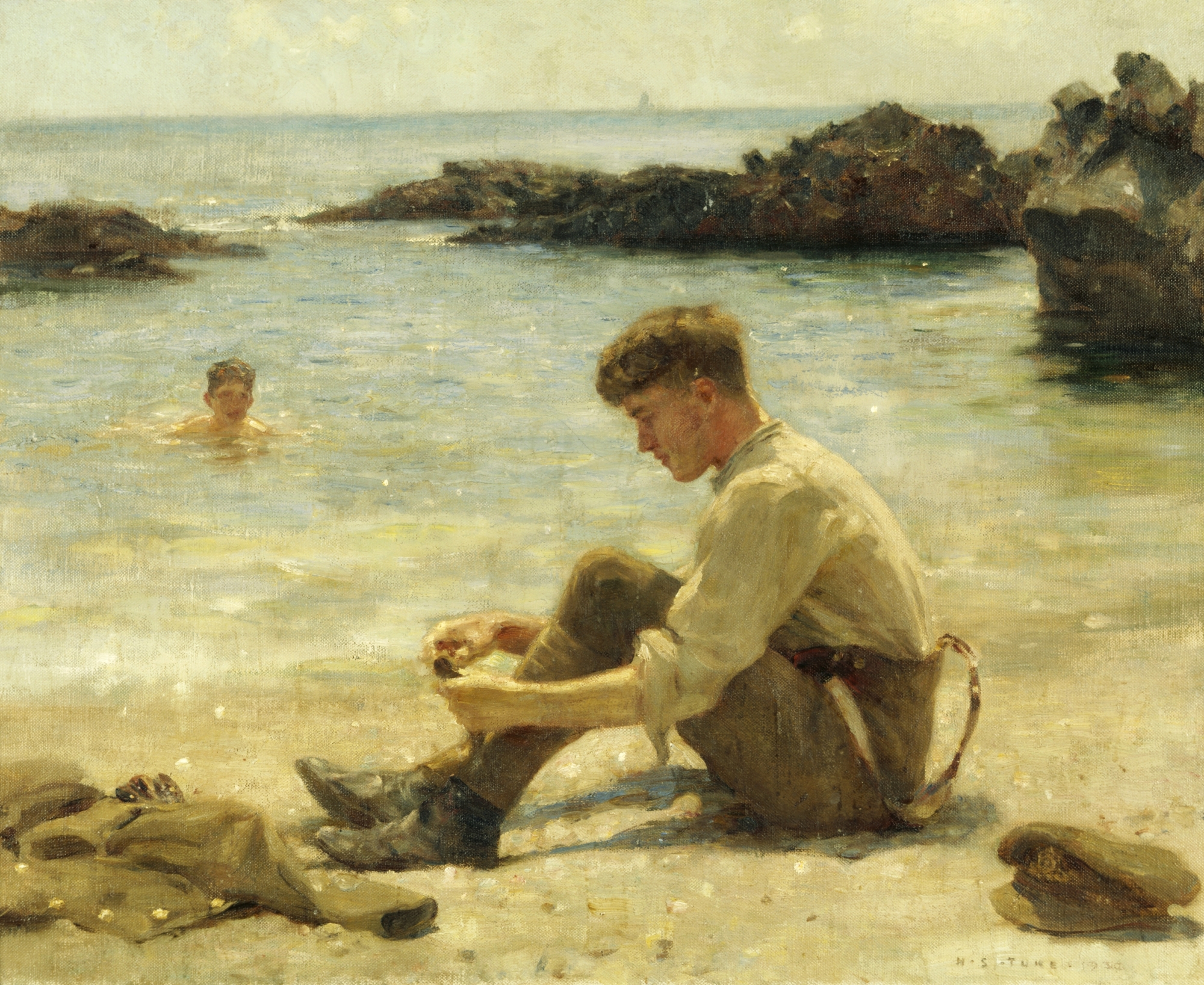
The Queer gaze: In the painting T. E. Lawrence as a Cadet at Newporth Beach (1921–1922) depicts Lawrence as the young man on the beach being gazed at by the man in the water. (Henry Scott Tuke)

Male-gaze theory also proposes that the male gaze is a psychological "safety valve for homoerotic tensions" among heterosexual men; in genre cinema, the psychological projection of homosexual attraction is sublimated onto the women characters of the story, to distract the spectator of the film story from noticing that homoeroticism is innate to friendships and relationships among men. In the essay "Masculinity, the Male Spectator and the Homoerotic Gaze" (1998), Patrick Shuckmann said that homoerotic-gaze theory reframes sexual objectification into the practice of othering men and women to deflect attention from the homoeroticism inherent to male relationships; thus, the gaze of the cinema camera renders women characters into both objects of desire and objects of displaced desire.

Using three story-plots in which the male gaze voids the homoerotic gaze in the relationships among the male characters in the story, Schuckmann shows that the visual and thematic purpose of women characters in a movie is to validate heteronormativity: heterosexuality as the social norm. The first plot is an action film featuring two men in close-quarters combat; their violence is their implicit engagement with the homoeroticism inherent to physical contact, and use their male-gaze-objectification of the women characters as the "safety valve" that displaces the unspoken, emotional conflict of homoerotic attraction. The second plot is from the buddy film genre, which thematically acknowledges the existence of homoerotic tension between the two men who collaborate to realise a job. By way of allusive jokes and humour, the homoerotic tension is sublimated into the objectification of the heterosexual (man-woman) relationship that each man lives when off the job.

The third plot is the thematic exploration of good-and-evil within a character. In the genre film Point Break (1991), the female gaze of the woman director presents and analyses homoerotic attraction between the policeman protagonist and the bank-robber antagonist. In the course of chasing and evading each other, each man has opportunity to exercise his homoerotic gaze at the other man, both as object and as subject of desire, personal and professional. Thematically completing the plot and resolving the story requires that the policeman and the criminal seek the definitive masculine confrontation: the physical combat that will express and resolve their homosexual attraction, and the crime. Moreover, as commercial cinema, and despite the female-gaze cinematic perspective, Point Break includes an attractive woman to look at, a character whose visual function in the story is to continually affirm the heterosexuality of the male characters to the male spectators of the movie.

== Criticism ==
In "The Savage Id" (1999), feminist academic Camille Paglia rejected the concept of the male gaze as being the objectifying perspective of cinema. Paglia states:

From the moment feminism began to solidify its ideology in the early '70s, Hitchcock became a whipping-boy for feminist theory. I've been very vocal about my opposition to the simplistic theory of the male gaze that is associated with Laura Mulvey (and that she, herself, has moved somewhat away from) and that has taken over feminist film studies to a vampiric degree in the last twenty-five years.

The idea that a man looking at or a director filming a beautiful woman makes her an object, makes her passive beneath the male gaze which seeks control over woman by turning her into mere matter, into "meat" — I think this was utter nonsense from the start. [The male gaze] was formulated by people who knew nothing about the history of painting or sculpture, the history of the fine arts. [The male gaze] was an a priori theory: First there was feminist ideology, asserting that history is nothing but male oppression and female victimization, and then came this theory — the "victim" model of feminism applied wholesale to works of culture.

Nina Menkes's 2022 documentary about the cinematic male gaze based on Mulvey's works, Brainwashed: Sex-Camera-Power, was criticized by Marya E. Gates of RogerEbert.com as having a confirmation bias and Sarah Jane of The Austin Chronicle noting Menkes plucking out scenes from certain films without proper context. Lillian Crawford of Little White Lies was also critical of the film noting that: "Menkes is in such a rush to get through the history of cinema to point a finger of blame at everyone except herself, ending with her own films as examples of a negation of the gaze."

Elyce Rae Helford, a gender researcher, notes that Mulvey's theory has been criticised for essentialism.

Researcher Rhea Ashley Hoskin criticizes the tendency in social science to view feminine lesbian characters as created for the male gaze, and to present masculine lesbians as authentic. In her opinion, this trend reinforces the false idea that real lesbians are masculine, when in reality, according to her research, lesbians are diverse in their preferred gender expressions. She and Karen Blair also argue that the male gaze as a concept "revolves almost exclusively around the idea that femininity is performed by cisgender heterosexual women for men" which leaves "little room for alternative readings of femininity". In doing so, they argue that concepts like the male gaze can reduce femininity to the "sole purpose of a visual spectacle for another's gaze" and erase the existence of femmes or feminine lesbians.

Ellis Hanson, a film scholar, describes Mulvey's theory as "both enlightening and troubling," noting that the "heterocentric and exceedingly rigid structure of the look in Mulvey's psychoanalysis... writes homosexuality out of existence." Mulvey, and the larger body of feminist psychoanalysis following on from her, is "not necessarily unproductive or wrong" in his view, but merely ought not be the only framework for queer and/or feminist film critique.

Thus for the female, the objection to the male gaze serves not only to reject undesirable men and thus facilitate sexual selection and mate choice, but also to counter the feelings of personal insignificance arising out of narrow conceptions of self.

== See also ==
- Androcentrism
- Gendered dating norms
- Imperial gaze
- Male as norm
- Male supremacy
- Queer gaze
- Screen theory
- White gaze
- Sexual objectification

=== In film ===
- Princess Leia's bikini
