= Maria Giese =

American film director

- Born: United States
- Occupations: Film director, screenwriter

Maria Giese is an American feature film director and screenwriter. A member of the Directors Guild of America, and an activist for parity for women directors in Hollywood, she writes and lectures about the under-representation of women filmmakers in the United States.

== Early life ==
She has an associate degree from Bard College at Simon's Rock, a bachelor's degree from Wellesley College and a Masters of Fine Arts in film directing from the University of California, Los Angeles's Graduate School of Film and Technology. While at UCLA, she wrote, directed, and produced the student film A Dry Heat, for which she won a CINE Golden Eagle Award.

== Career ==
Giese wrote and directed the 1996 British film When Saturday Comes, produced by Capitol Films, UK, starring Sean Bean, Pete Postlethwaite, and Emily Lloyd. She also wrote, directed, and co-produced Hunger, based on Knut Hamsun's 1890 existentialist novel of the same title. Hunger was the first digital film made based on a classic work of literature. It starred Joseph Culp and Robert Culp and received two Best Film Awards and a Best Underground Film award.

Giese's other directing work includes the short doc A Lotta Lambada and the short film A Dry Heat, which won a UCLA Spotlight award, a Cine Golden Eagle, and was a finalist for the 1991 Student Academy Awards. She also directed the short film Take Your Seat (a.k.a. Jewish Water) which also won a Cine Golden Eagle, and an episode of the TV sitcom Solo En America for Columbia TriStar. She did uncredited rewrites on the 1996 film North Star.

She has taught film & TV production at UCLA Extension, lectures regularly, and writes extensively.

Giese is an active member of the Directors Guild of America since 1999 and currently serves as the Women's DGA Director Category Rep.

Giese and her successful activism for women directors in US entertainment media are the subject of three feature documentary films. Brainwashed: Sex-Camera-Power (2022) directed by Nina Menkes, which had its World Premiere at the 2022 Sundance Film Festival and International Premiere at The Berlinale 2022, This Changes Everything (2019), directed by Tom Donahue, starring Geena Davis and Maria Giese, and featuring Meryl Streep, Shonda Rhimes, Natalie Portman, and Reese Witherspoon was released worldwide in 2019 after premiering at Toronto International Film Festival in 2018 . Half The Picture (2018), directed by Amy Adrion and featuring Giese along with Miranda July and Ava DuVernay, premiered with Giese in attendance at the 2017 Sundance Film Festival.

== Activism ==
Giese is an activist for women directors. She is a member of the Directors Guild of America where she is an active member of the Women's Steering Committee and where she served as the inaugural Women Directors Category Representative and the inaugural co-chair of the DGA-WSC Proposals Subcommittee, the first ever conduit between the Women's Steering Committee and the DGA National Board. On this committee, she and co-chair, Melanie Wagor, were able to move proposals for women DGA members into the 2014 DGA-studio collective bargaining negotiations.

She is also a member of the Alliance of Women Directors. She co-founded, and frequently writes for, the advocacy website Women Directors in Hollywood. Her articles have appeared in Ms., Elle, Film Inquiry, and IndieWIRE. Giese herself has recently been profiled in Bloomberg TV, ABC Live, The New York Times, The Los Angeles Times, Forbes, Fortune, and The Hollywood Reporter, among others. Her writings have also appeared in Ms. magazine and Indiewire.

In 2011, Giese turned her attention to the underrepresentation of women directors in United States media. She began researching and writing about viable legal strategies to remediate illegal discrimination against women in Hollywood, citing Title VII of the Civil Rights Act of 1964. She "first took her statistics and legal brief to the EEOC but was turned away." In 2013, she took her findings to the ACLU of Southern California, who launched an investigation after months of convincing. Finally, in 2015, after four years of activism in the Directors Guild of America, Giese instigated the biggest industry-wide Federal investigation for women directors in Hollywood history, going on now.

== #MeToo Movement ==
Shortly after the ACLU launched its investigation of Hollywood's job discrimination, the New York Times published its 2017 article "that triggered the Metoo movement", exposing Harvey Weinstein of sexual harassment and assault. "'It was explosive,' says Giese, 'and suddenly our industry was throwing millions of dollars into the creation of new inside-industry enforcement organizations like Time's Up, The Hollywood Commission, ReFrame, and many others.'"

== Awards ==
Giese is the recipient of numerous awards including 2016 Equity Award from Stanford University, two Golden Cine Eagles, a Kovler Writing Award, a Spotlight Award, First Prize at the American International Film Festival, a Charles Speroni Scholarship, and an MPAA Award of Excellence.

Additional awards include Outstanding Achievement by a Woman in the Film Industry for making Brainwashed with Nina Menkes.

== Reception ==
In The New York Times, Manohla Dargis referred to her work as "a veritable crusade." And in 2016, Philadelphia Inquirer writer, Carrie Rickey, wrote, "So allow me to introduce real-life female crusader Maria Giese, whose fact-finding led to the ACLU findings that prompted the current EEOC investigation." According to The Los Angeles Times in October 2016, the EEOC "is now widening its circle of interview subjects to include studio executives, producers, agents, actors and male directors, according to multiple sources familiar with the investigation who declined to be identified because they were not authorized to speak publicly."

In POV Magazine, Maya Gallous described Giese's work as portrayed in This Changes Everything as "...a Herculean effort (scratch that, an Amazonian effort) [...] making the industry accountable for what are, essentially, illegal discriminatory hiring practices." [32] Film Inquiry referred to Giese in This Changes Everything as "the most striking subject [...] Giese sacrificed her directing career for this cause. She essentially banded the women directors together – since there was no change coming from within Hollywood, she decided to take the problem to the federal level. Because of her plea, the ACLU took on the case and has convinced the EEOC (who initially didn't want anything to do with it) to investigate the systemic discrimination in Hollywood."

== Personal life ==
Giese lives in Venice, CA and Stonington, CT with her husband and two children.

== Filmography ==
- A Lotta Lambada (1990)
- Jewish Water (1992)
- A Dry Heat (1991)
- North Star (1996)
- When Saturday Comes (1996)
- Hunger (2001)
- Half The Picture (2018)
- This Changes Everything (2019)
- Brainwashed: Sex-Camera-Power (2022)

== Contributor ==
- "U.S. Women Directors: The Road Ahead" in Silent Women: Pioneers of Cinema, 2016.
