= Welcome to the Men's Group =

- Directed by: Joseph Culp
- Written by: Scott Ben-Yashar; Joseph Culp
- Produced by: Scott Ben-Yashar; Joseph Culp
- Starring: Timothy Bottoms; Stephen Tobolowsky; Terence J. Rotolo; Joseph Culp; Mackenzie Astin; Ali Saam; Phil Abrams; David Clennon
- Cinematography: Monty Rowan
- Edited by: Dan O’Brien
- Music by: Dan Radlauer
- Production company: Men's Group Productions
- Distributed by: Dark Star Pictures
- Release dates: June 18, 2016 (Paris); May 16, 2018 (Beverly Hills)
- Running time: 130 minutes
- Country: United States
- Language: English

Welcome to the Men's Group is a 2016 American comedy-drama film directed by Joseph Culp and starring Timothy Bottoms, Stephen Tobolowsky, Terence J. Rotolo, Culp, Mackenzie Astin, Ali Saam, Phil Abrams and David Clennon.

== Plot ==
Larry wakes up to find his wife is not there. A flashback indicates that Larry and his wife had an argument previously and she walked out. The men's group that Larry is part of is having their meeting at his home, so looking for his wife has to be put on hold.

The meeting shows that the men are dealing with challenges in life, both personal and professional. Soon, disagreements arise along with revelations. Carl strips and runs around the neighborhood naked, and later, Michael is found to be hiding a secret that involves a member of Larry's family.

== Cast ==
- Timothy Bottoms as Larry
- Stephen Tobolowsky as Carl
- Joseph Culp as Michael
- David Clennon as Fred
- Mackenzie Astin as Tom
- Ali Saam as Mohammed
- Terence J. Rotolo as Eddie
- Phil Abrams as Neil

== Release ==
The film was released at the Ahrya Fine Arts Theater in Beverly Hills, California on May 16, 2018.

== Reception ==
Bradley Gibson of Film Threat gave the film a 6 out of 10.

Stephen Farber of The Hollywood Reporter gave the film a positive review and wrote "The film is overlong and wildly uneven (...), but it benefits from a strong cast making the most of some sharp moments exposing the underside of male privilege and domination."
