= When Saturday Comes (film) =

1996 film directed by Maria Giese

- DVD cover
- Directed by: Maria Giese
- Written by: Maria Giese; Story by James Daly
- Produced by: James Daly; Christopher Lambert; Meir Teper
- Starring: Sean Bean; Emily Lloyd; Pete Postlethwaite
- Cinematography: Grant Cameron; Gerry Fisher
- Edited by: George Akers
- Music by: Anne Dudley; Joe Elliott
- Distributed by: Guild
- Release date: 1 March 1996
- Running time: 98 minutes
- Country: United Kingdom
- Language: English
- Box office: £722,934 (UK)

When Saturday Comes is a 1996 British film directed by Maria Giese and starring Sean Bean and Emily Lloyd. The film was released in March 1996, and was distributed by Guild Film Distribution. The soundtrack includes a variety of classic music tracks as well as newly commissioned songs. The score was composed by Anne Dudley and the soundtrack includes contributions from Tony Hadley of Spandau Ballet and Sheffield artists including Def Leppard's Joe Elliott who performs on two new tracks: "When Saturday Comes" and the instrumental "Jimmy's Theme". Both were performed with bandmates Rick Savage and Phil Collen. According to Elliott, he had a part in the film as the brother of Sean Bean's character, but the part was cut from the final film.

== Plot ==
Jimmy Muir, a worker at the Stones Brewery, gets scouted. First, by the well-known non-league side Hallam F.C., and then later by Sheffield United Football Club.

== Cast ==
- Sean Bean – Jimmy Muir
- Emily Lloyd – Annie Doherty
- Craig Kelly – Russel Muir
- Melanie Hill – Mary Muir
- John McEnery – Joe Muir
- Ann Bell – Sarah Muir
- Ian Taylor – Jimmy Muir as kid
- Tony Currie – Tony Currie
- Mel Sterland – Captain Sheffield United
- Pete Postlethwaite – Ken Jackson
- Rebecca Nichols – Stripper
- Chris Walker – Mac
- Douglas McFerran - Norman the Foreman
- John Higgins – Rob
- Tim Gallagher – Steve
- Peter Gunn – Tommy
- Nick Waring – Gerry
- James McKenna – George McCabe
- Daniel Oldham – Street Footballing Kid
- David Gibbons – Boy on bus
- Lucy Rodgers – Debbie
- Tracy Shaw – Tina
- Ken Kitson - Careers Advisor
- Martin Tyler - Commentator

== Production ==
It was filmed at various locations around South Yorkshire, including Rotherham, Sandygate Road and Bramall Lane. Def Leppard lead singer Joe Elliott made his acting debut in a scene as Jimmy's brother, but the scene was cut from the final production.

== Reception ==
When Saturday Comes opened on 1 March 1996 in the UK on 174 screens and grossed £245,936 in its opening weekend, placing at sixth at the UK box office. It went on to gross £722,934 in the UK.

== See also ==
- List of association football films
