= Kathleen Luong =

Vietnamese American actress and model (1974–2020)

- Born: November 13, 1974; Saigon, South Vietnam
- Died: October 28, 2020 (aged 45); Westminster, California, U.S.
- Other name: Katie Luong
- Occupations: Film/TV Actress, model

Kathleen Luong (November 13, 1974 – October 28, 2020) was a Vietnamese American actress and model. She is usually credited as Katie Luong.

Luong was born in Saigon, South Vietnam. In 1979 her family left Vietnam, and sailed to Malaysia. They immigrated to the United States and eventually settled in Orange County, CA where Katie was raised.

Luong's first work in television was during her high school years when she was offered a job to appear in a Vietnamese karaoke video. After starring in a few music videos, she fell in love with acting and being in front of the camera.

Her first of 15 television and film credits was a 1996 appearance in an episode of the television series Baywatch, followed by one-off appearances in 2 Days in the Valley, JAG, The Magnificent Seven and Threat Matrix, along with film roles in Green Dragon, Hunger, Missing Brendan and In Search of a Midnight Kiss (2007), her last credited role.

In her later years, Katie opened Katie's Munchies in Westminster, CA serving mostly local high school students.

Luong died of cancer on October 28, 2020. She was 45 years old.
