= Hunger (2001 film) =

2001 film by Maria Giese

- Directed by: Maria Giese
- Screenplay by: Maria Giese
- Based on: Hunger; 1890 novel by Knut Hamsun
- Produced by: Joseph Culp; Maria Giese
- Starring: Joseph Culp; Robert Culp; Kathleen Luong
- Cinematography: Jonathan Millman
- Edited by: Sam Citron
- Music by: Kazimir Boyle; Trevor Morris
- Production company: Hunger Productions
- Release dates: January 13, 2001; (San Francisco Independent Film Festival, premiere)
- Running time: 88 minutes
- Country: U.S.
- Language: English

Hunger is a 2001 film written and directed by Maria Giese, based upon the 1890 novel of the same title by Norwegian author Knut Hamsun.

Shot in Denmark on a shoestring budget, it features Joseph Culp as well as his father Robert Culp in a supporting role.

The score was composed by Kazimir Boyle and Trevor Morris, who went on to compose music for The Tudors and Vikings.

== Premise ==
A sensitive writer from a small town faces spiritual crisis as he tries to make it as a Hollywood screenwriter. Charlie Pontus wanders around Los Angeles torn between his efforts to sell a screenplay and find his next meal. His natural optimism keeps him afloat as he walks the tightrope between his love for the beautiful, exotic Ylayali and his desperate connection to The Chief, the Hollywood producer who has the power to give life or take it away. Stubbornly refusing to relinquish his principles, he sinks deeper and deeper into spiritual crisis, finally confronting God in a Jobian showdown. Ultimately, the story illustrates the difficult balance between artistic integrity and the commercial necessities of Hollywood.

== Cast ==
- Joseph Culp as Charlie Pontus
- Robert Culp as The Chief
- Kathleen Luong as Ylayali
- Daniel Franklin as "Eclair"
- Casper Andreas as "Scissors"
- James Quill as "The Duke"
- Bruce Solomon as Mr. Christie
- Frank Bruynbroek as Spy Man #1
- Jason Berlin as Spy Man #2
- Susan Rich as Sexy Woman
- Nicole Ozment as Hostess
