= Félix Trutat =

French painter (1824–1848)

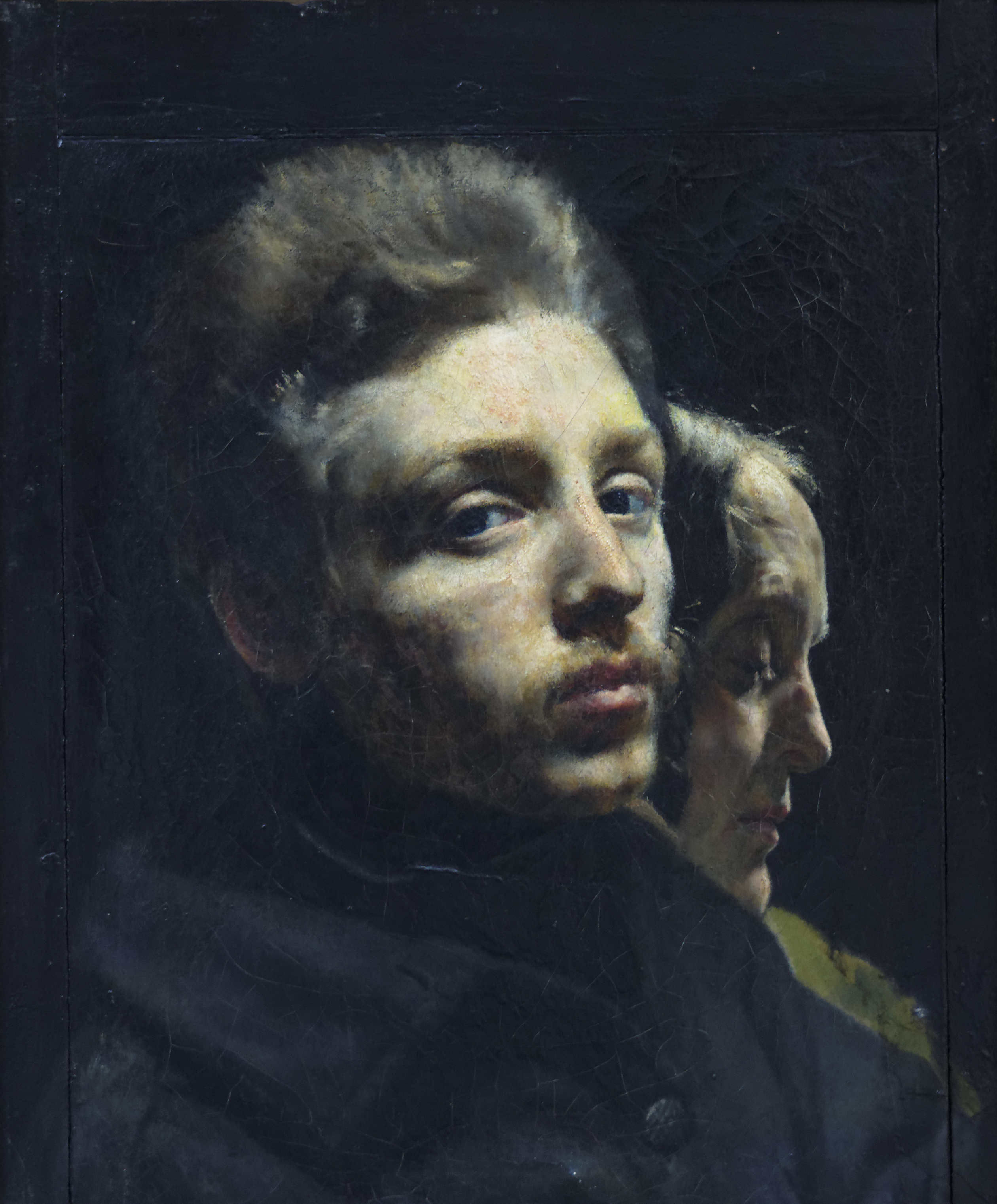
- Portrait of the Artist and His Mother; Portrait de l'artiste et de sa mère (1846)
- Born: 27 February 1824; Dijon, France
- Died: 7 March 1848 (aged 24); Dijon, France

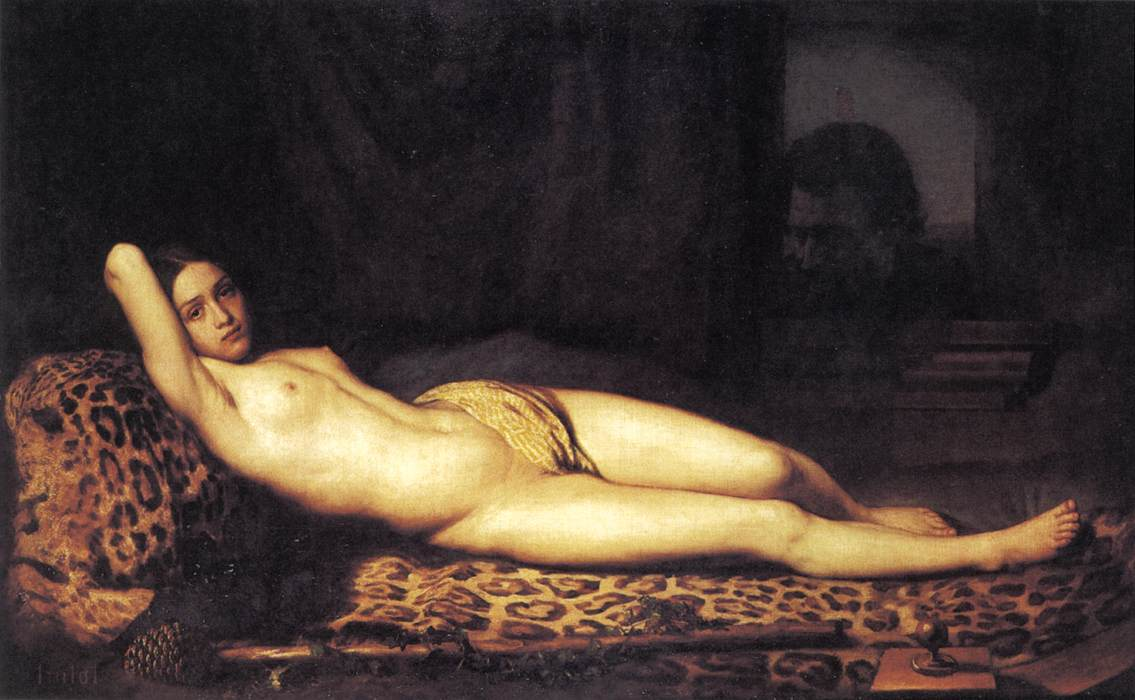
Nude Girl on a Panther Skin (1844)

Félix Trutat (27 February 1824 – 7 March 1848) was a French painter, known primarily for portraits and nudes.

== Life and work ==
He studied with Léon Cogniet and Pierre-Paul Hamon at the École nationale supérieure des Beaux-Arts in Paris. He also absorbed stylistic influences from the Venetian Old Masters that he copied in the Louvre.

He died of tuberculosis at the age of twenty-four, with no known offspring.

Many of his works are reminiscent of Gustave Courbet. A majority of them are in the collection of the Musée des beaux-arts de Dijon; including his self-portrait. Among those on display elsewhere is a portrait of an unidentified woman at the Musée national Jean-Jacques Henner.

A street in Dijon has been named after him.

His cousin, Eugène Trutat, was a well known photographer and Director of the Muséum de Toulouse.

His first painting, Nude Girl on a Panther Skin, was used by John Berger to illustrate the concept of the male gaze in his groundbreaking work Ways of Seeing. (Berger identified it within the book by an alternate title, Reclining Bacchante).
