= Queen of Diamonds (film) =

- Directed by: Nina Menkes
- Written by: Nina Menkes
- Produced by: Nina Menkes
- Starring: Tinka Menkes
- Cinematography: Nina Menkes
- Production company: Menkesfilm
- Distributed by: Facets Multi-Media
- Release date: January 1991 (Sundance)
- Running time: 77 minutes
- Country: United States
- Language: English

Queen of Diamonds is a 1991 American independent drama film directed by Nina Menkes, starring her sister Tinka Menkes.

== Plot ==
A portrait of a damaged, alienated woman named Firdaus, who also works as a Las Vegas blackjack dealer.

== Cast ==
- Tinka Menkes as Firdaus
- Emmellda Beech as Best Friend

== Release ==
The film premiered at the Sundance Film Festival in January 1991.

== Reception ==
Glenn Kenny of The New York Times called the film "an urgent portrayal of the tedium of endless transaction." Leslie Combemale of the Alliance of Women Film Journalists rated the film 4.5 stars out of 5 and wrote that it "offers a fascinating look at how a female filmmaker can reframe or manipulate what has, over time, become the traditional visual language of film, in the service of more femme-centric storytelling."

TV Guide wrote that the Menkes' "gift for creating memorable images plays off of Tinka Menkes' restrained but powerful acting to give Queen of Diamonds an impact above and beyond its spare story line." Erika Balsom Cinema Scope wrote that the film "does not quite abide by the reality principle. It hints at how things could be more, could be otherwise-and maybe already are."

== Legacy ==
In 2023, the film was selected for preservation in the National Film Registry by the Library of Congress, being deemed "culturally, historically, or aesthetically significant".
