= David Clennon =

American actor

- Born: May 10, 1943 (age 83)
- Occupation: Actor
- Years active: 1969–present

David Clennon (born May 10, 1943) is an American actor. He is known for his portrayal of Miles Drentell in the ABC series Thirtysomething and Once and Again, as well as his role as Palmer in the John Carpenter film The Thing. He has been frequently cast in films directed by Hal Ashby, Costa-Gavras and Jordan Walker-Pearlman.

== Life and career ==
In 1980, Clennon provided the voice for Admiral Motti in NPR's Star Wars The Original Radio Drama. He was a regular on the TV shows Barney Miller, WKRP in Cincinnati, Almost Perfect, The Agency, and Saved. Clennon also played Carl Sessick (a.k.a. Carl the Watcher) on Ghost Whisperer and appeared on Star Trek: Voyager as Dr. Crell Moset. In 1993 he won an Emmy award for his guest appearance on the series Dream On.

Clennon often performs at New Haven, Connecticut's Long Wharf Theatre.

== Political activism ==
Clennon staunchly opposed the Vietnam War, often participating in protests, and remains politically active. In 2013, he repeatedly spoke out against the film Zero Dark Thirty and refused to vote for it for an Academy Award, stating that it promoted using torture as acceptable.

I firmly believe that the film Zero Dark Thirty promotes the acceptance of the crime of torture as a legitimate weapon in America's so-called war on terror. In that belief, following my conscience, I will not vote for Zero Dark Thirty in any category. I cannot vote for a film that makes heroes of Americans who commit the crime of torture.

In 2018, he opposed the four Emmy nominations for Ken Burns's documentary program The Vietnam War, feeling that it contained "half-truths, distortions and omissions" about the war.

== Filmography ==
- The Paper Chase (1973) - Toombs
- Helter Skelter (1976, TV Movie) - Harry Jones
- Bound for Glory (1976) - Carl - Man in Gas Station
- The Greatest (1977)
- Coming Home (1978) - Tim
- Gray Lady Down (1978) - Crew member of USS Neptune
- Go Tell the Spartans (1978) - Lt. Finley Wattsberg
- On the Yard (1978) - Psychiatrist
- Billy in the Lowlands (1979) - Social Worker
- Being There (1979) - Thomas Franklin
- Hide in Plain Sight (1980) - Richard Fieldston
- WKRP in Cincinnati (1981, TV Series) - Norris Breeze
- The Thing (1982) - Palmer
- The Escape Artist (1982) - Newspaper Editor
- Missing (1982) - Consul Phil Putnam
- Ladies and Gentlemen, The Fabulous Stains (1982) - Dave Robell - The Agent
- Special Bulletin (1983, TV Movie) - Dr. Bruce Lyman
- Star 80 (1983) - Geb
- Hanna K. (1983) - Amnon
- The Right Stuff (1983) - Liaison Man
- Falling in Love (1984) - Brian Gilmore
- Sweet Dreams (1985) - Randy Hughes
- Legal Eagles (1986) - Blanchard
- The Trouble with Dick (1986) - Lars
- He's My Girl (1987) - Mason Morgan
- The Couch Trip (1988) - Lawrence Baird
- Betrayed (1988) - Jack Carpenter
- Downtown (1990) - Jerome Sweet
- Light Sleeper (1992) - Robert
- Man Trouble (1992) - Lewie Duart
- Matinee (1993) - Jack
- And the Band Played On (1993, TV Movie) - Mr. Johnstone
- Dos crímenes (1994) - Jim
- Almost Perfect (TV series) - (1995-1997) - Neal Luder
- Grace of My Heart (1996) - Dr. 'Jonesy' Jones
- From the Earth to the Moon (1998, TV Mini-Series) - Dr. Leon (Lee) Silver
- Playing by Heart (1998) - Martin (uncredited)
- Nothing Human (Star Trek: Voyager) (1998) - Crell Moset
- Just Shoot Me! (1999, TV Series) - Martin Spancer
- The Visit (2000) - Parole Board Member Brenner
- Antitrust (2001) - Barry Linder (uncredited)
- Silver City (2004) - Mort Seymour
- Constellation (2005) - Bear Korngold
- Syriana (2005) - Donald
- Life of the Party (2005) - Jack
- Grey’s Anatomy (American TV series, 2005) - season 4 episode 5
- Flags of Our Fathers (2006) - White House Official
- Scrubs (2006) - Dr. Turner
- Saving Sarah Cain (2007) - Homeless Man
- Convention (2008) - Sen. Chuck McGee
- Ghost Whisperer (TV series - season 4, 2008-2009) - Carl Sessick
- Extraordinary Measures (2010) - Dr. Renzler
- The Good Doctor (2011) - Dr. Harbison
- Ghost Phone: Phone Calls from the Dead (2011) - Hamilton
- J. Edgar (2011) - Senator Friendly
- Mr. Jones (2013) - The Curator
- House of Cards (2014, TV Series) - Ted Havemeyer
- Gone Girl (2014) - Rand Elliott
- Amigo Undead (2015) - Old Man Schumer
- Vacation (2015) - Harry Co-Pilot
- Reversion (2015) - Ciespy
- Welcome to the Men's Group (2016) - Fred
