= Susanna and the Elders (Tintoretto) =

Painting by Tintoretto

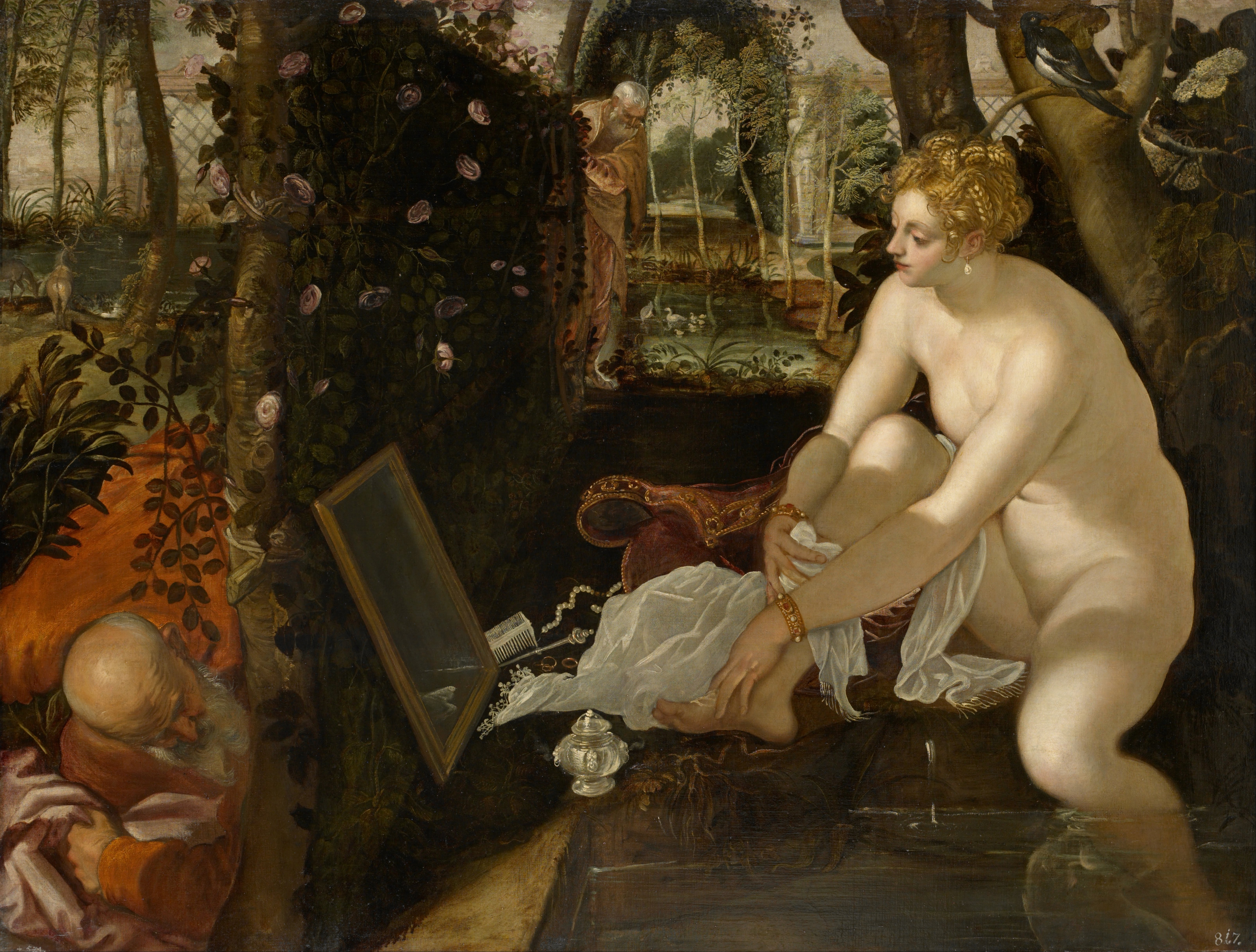
- Artist: Tintoretto
- Year: (1555 - 1556)
- Medium: Oil on canvas
- Dimensions: 146 cm × 193.6 cm (57 in × 76.2 in)
- Location: Kunsthistorisches Museum; Vienna

Susanna and the Elders is an oil painting by the Venetian painter Tintoretto (Jacopo Robusti, 1518–1594). Robusti, also known as Tintoretto or Il Furioso, for the energy and "fury" with which he painted, depicted both sacred and profane subjects in a period sometimes known as the Venetian “golden century”.

Susanna and the Elders (c. 1555–56) depicts a scene from the biblical episode of Susanna, from the Book of Daniel. It is now in the Kunsthistorisches Museum, Vienna. Susanna and the Elders was a popular subject in late Renaissance art.

== Subject ==
According to the biblical story, a young married Jewish woman named Susanna bathed in a pool in her garden every day. One day, two elderly men who were guests of Susanna's wealthy husband Joakim, lusted for Susanna, who was described as "The Beautiful Susanna". The elders – who were judges and respectable members of the community – came to an agreement that they would wait until Susanna was alone in the garden and then have their way with her. After Susanna sent away her maids to fetch fragrant oils and perfumes for her bath, the two men rushed forward, propositioning her to have sex with them. They threatened to denounce her if she rejected their advances.

Susanna rejected their proposal. The two prominent elders of the community then publicly denounced her, falsely accusing her of committing adultery with a young man. According to ancient Jewish law, adultery was punishable by death, and Susanna was condemned to death after everyone believed the two judges' story. Upset and crying, Susanna was taken away to be executed. She turned to God, calling upon him to prove her innocence. A young man named Daniel was standing in the crowd watching. While witnessing the procession Daniel heard the voice of an angel. The angel urged him to speak up and prevent the killing of an innocent woman who was being framed for doing something she had not done. (The young Daniel would later be known as the prophet Daniel.) The young man, surprised, felt obliged to halt the execution. He asked to be allowed to interrogate the two elders separately so that they could not speak to each other. Daniel then cross-examined the judges on how they had discovered Susanna, what the young man looked like, where they secretly met and so on. He kept receiving contradictory answers from the elders. When asked under which tree Susanna had committed adultery, the two elders gave very different answers and named different kinds of trees. The elderly judges were exposed for lying and for bearing false witness – a capital crime according to ancient Jewish law. Daniel proved Susanna was innocent, and she was freed while the elders were condemned.

== Painting ==
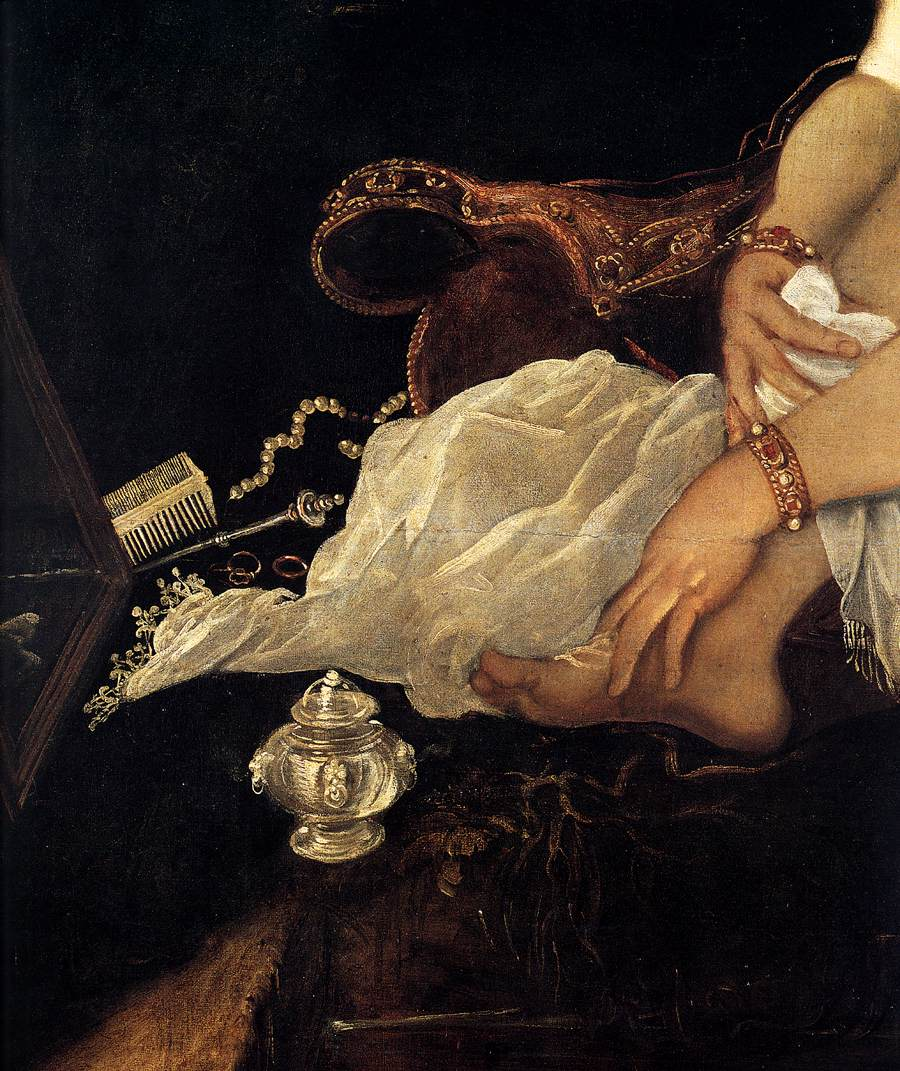
Susanna and the Elders, detail

The painting shows a naked Susanna sitting in a garden beside a pool, leaning against a tree, and facing a dense rose trellis, against which leans a mirror. Susanna gazes into the mirror. Around her on the ground are several bright objects including a white silk shawl, pearls, jewelry, a comb, and silverware, which together form a kind of still life. Two elderly men peer around either end of the rose trellis to watch her. Susanna is sitting absorbed by her reflection in the mirror and unaware of the intruders.

== History ==
Tintoretto's Susanna and the Elders, from 1555/56, is one of several works on the same subject from the artist's studio. One of the pictures is exhibited at the Louvre, the Museo del Prado and in the National Gallery of Art in Washington, D.C.

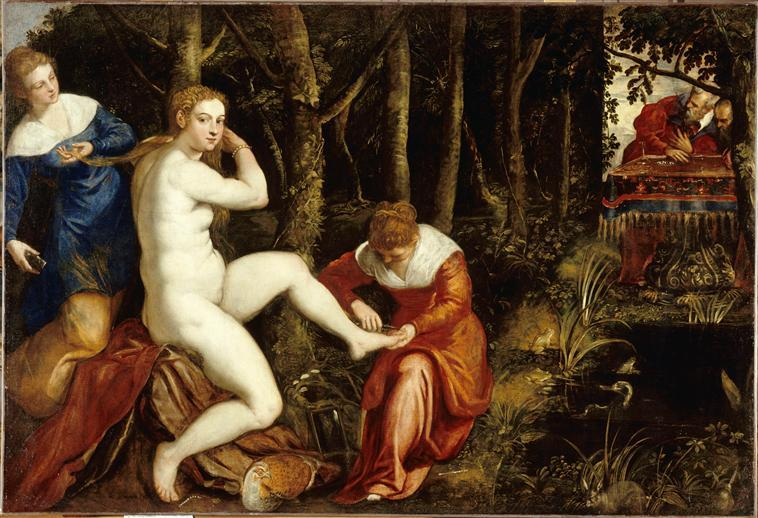
Domenico Tintoretto, Susanna and the Elders (c. 1550–1560), Louvre

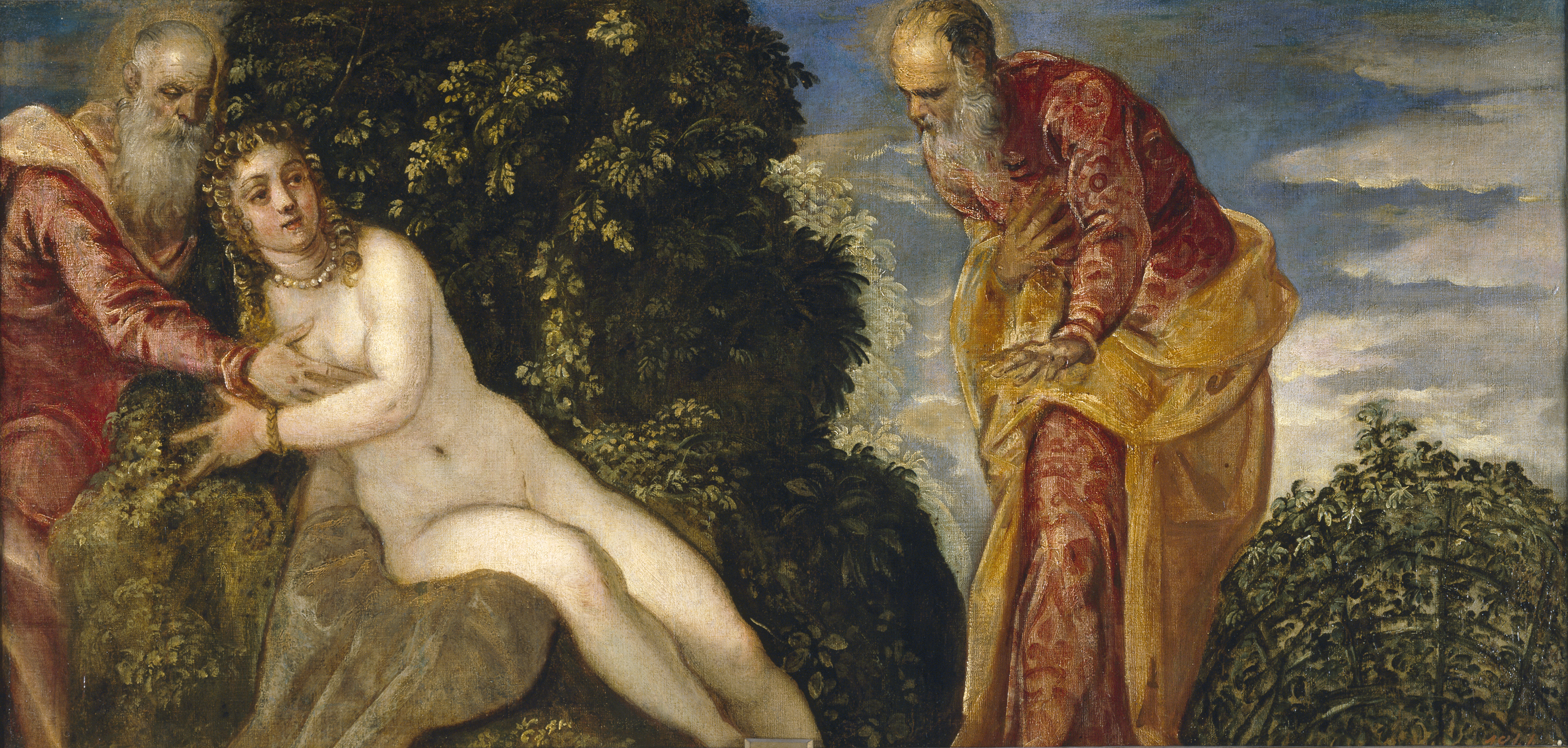
Domenico Tintoretto, Susanna and the Elders (c. 1552–1555), Museo del Prado

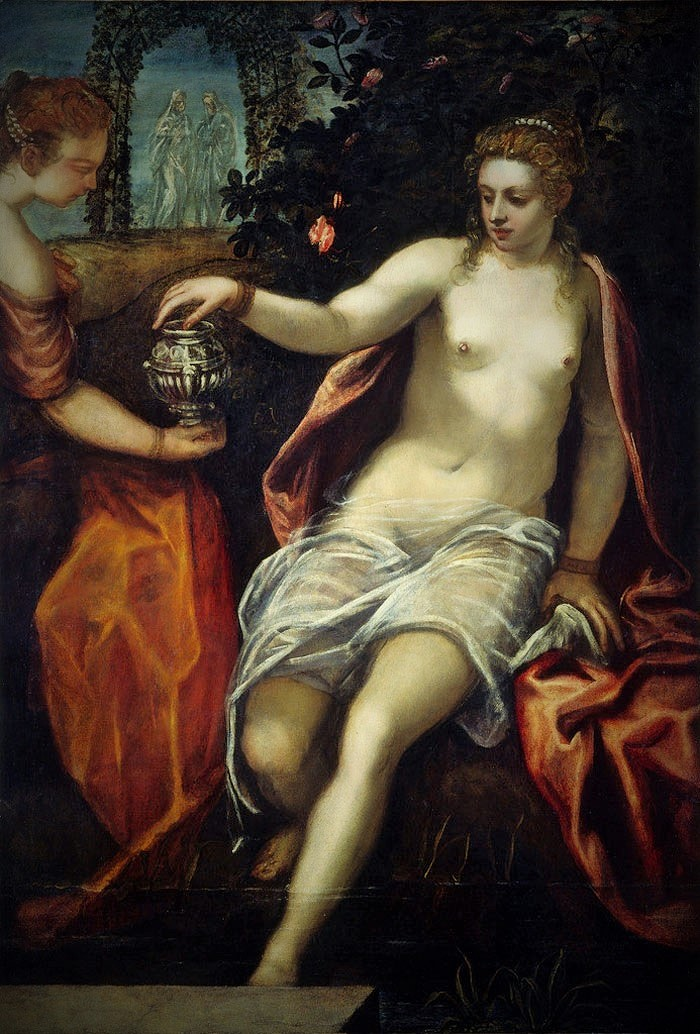
Domenico Tintoretto, Susanna (c. 1580), oil on canvas, 150.2 x 102.6 cm. National Gallery of Art, Washington DC
