= Brainwashed: Sex-Camera-Power =

2022 documentary film by Nina Menkes

Brainwashed is a 2022 American documentary film directed by Nina Menkes. The writer-director "developed her 2017 essay and PowerPoint presentation into a film, examining the biased ways in which women are represented onscreen versus men." Using clips from hundreds of movies (including her own fictional films), Menkes explores the sexual politics of cinematic shot design; she also includes interviews with women and nonbinary artists, film theorists, and scholars (Joey Soloway, Julie Dash, Catherine Hardwicke, Eliza Hittman and Laura Mulvey), who discuss "the exploitative effects of the male gaze."

== Production ==
The "CalArts instructor had, for years, delivered a talk about the visual objectification of women in film to her students," and eventually to general audiences. At Sundance, in the "wake of the start of the #MeToo movement", it was suggested that she should turn her presentation into a feature film.

Filmmaker Tim Disney signed on as an executive producer after Menkes pitched him the project. The film's funding was "offered as a tax-deductible donation to the International Documentary Association via the organization's fiscal sponsorship program."

Menkes shot her Brainwashed presentation before the pandemic, before directing most of the film's interviews over Zoom calls due to COVID-19.

Co-producer of Brainwashed, Maria Giese, is a filmmaker, feminist activist, and member of the Directors Guild of America. She realized that the "virtual absence of women directors in Hollywood was tantamount to the censoring and silencing of female voices in US media -- America's most influential global export."

Giese took her findings to the ACLU of Southern California, which prompted an official investigation into Hollywood's job discrimination. She observed that "entertainment is the worst offender of Title VII employment anti-discrimination laws of any U.S. industry." Shortly after, The New York Times published its 2017 article "that triggered the MeToo movement", exposing Harvey Weinstein of sexual harassment and assault. "'It was explosive,' says Giese, 'and suddenly our industry was throwing millions of dollars into the creation of new inside-industry enforcement organizations like Time's Up, The Hollywood Commission, ReFrame, and many others.'"

== Release ==
The film premiered at the 2022 Sundance Film Festival. It premiered internationally at the 2022 Berlin International Film Festival.

In May 2022, it was announced that international film distribution company Kino Lorber had acquired the North American distribution rights to Brainwashed for the film's release, in collaboration with Kanopy, "the premium library streaming platform for films that matter." Wendy Lidell, Sr. VP of Kino Lorber stated "Nina Menkes' Brainwashed pulls the curtain back on the many ways male-dominated image making has been internalized by men and women alike, and the overwhelming ripple effect it has had on our culture..."

== The Menkes List ==
Through the film, Nina argues that shot design is gendered, via a list of 5 points. UK Blogger Caz Armstrong dubbed these points "The Menkes List".

The Menkes List:

1. POV/Subject/Object - Male subject, female object.
2. Framing - The way shots are composed, including fragmentation of female body parts.
3. Camera Movement - Body pans + tilts; slow motion used differently for male and female actors.
4. Lighting - 3D (male) vs. 2D/fantasy lighting (female)
5. Narrative Position - Camera techniques 1-4 often undermine the female characters' narrative position, even when they are a protagonist in the narrative.

== Reception ==
Rotten Tomatoes gave the film 70% based on reviews from 54 critics. The site's critical consensus states "Although its subject calls for a more incisive treatment, Brainwashed: Sex-Camera-Power is a worthy primer on the male gaze in cinema."

Peter Bradshaw of The Guardian calls Brainwashed "fierce and focused... a bracing blast of critical rigour, taking a clear, cool look at the unexamined assumptions behind what we see on the screen."

Kate Erbland of Indiewire says "Nina Menkes' eye-opening documentary will forever change how you look at films", and for Screen Daily, Finn Halligan writes "Menkes is a real no-bullshit breath of fresh air. With a torch. And with any luck, she's heading your way to set fire to something, soon."

The film was criticized by Marya E. Gates of RogerEbert.com as having a confirmation bias and Sarah Jane of The Austin Chronicle noticing Menkes plucking out scenes from certain films without proper context. Lillian Crawford of Little White Lies is critical of the film noting that: "Menkes is in such a rush to get through the history of cinema to point a finger of blame at everyone except herself, ending with her own films as examples of a negation of the gaze."

== Accolades ==
The Alliance of Women Film Journalists nominated the film for the award Outstanding Achievement by a Woman in the Film Industry.
