= Joseph Culp =

American actor and director (born 1963)

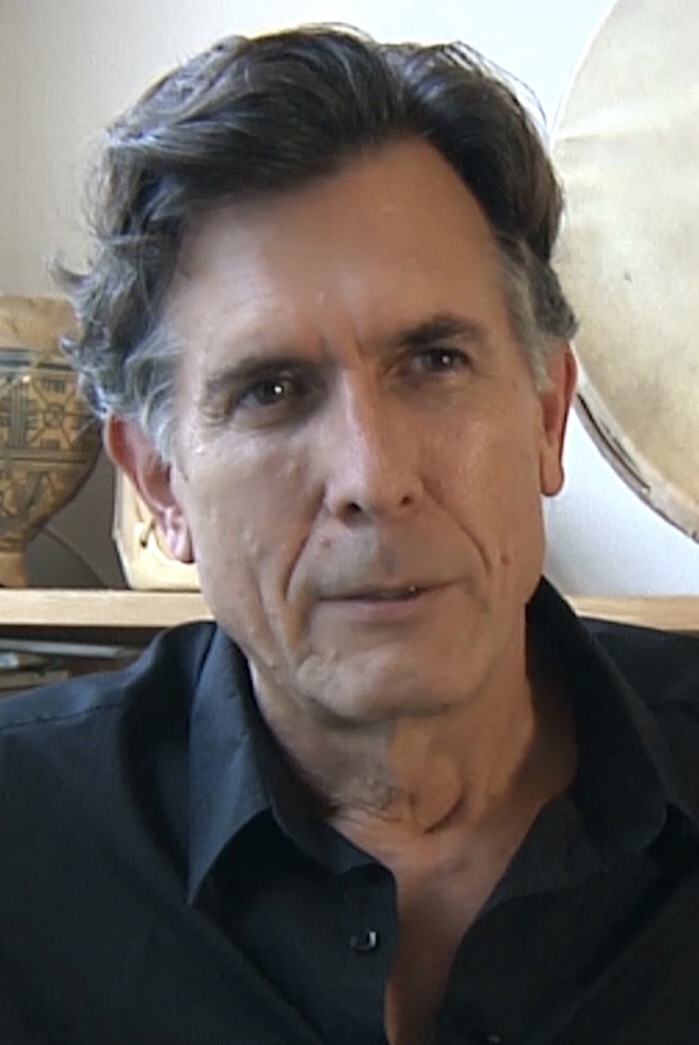
- Culp in Men Need Men (2019)
- Born: January 9, 1963 (age 63); Los Angeles, California, U.S.
- Occupations: Actor, director
- Years active: 1983–present
- Spouse: Lauren Culp
- Father: Robert Culp
- Relatives: Bones (nephew)

Joseph Culp (born January 9, 1963) is an American actor and director. He is the son of actor Robert Culp and his second wife Nancy Ashe. He received his acting training at HB Studio in New York City.

== Career ==
Culp appeared in a recurring role as Archie Whitman, the depression-era father of Jon Hamm's character Don Draper in the AMC series Mad Men. He was the first actor ever to play Doctor Doom in the first film version of Marvel Comics' Fantastic Four in the unreleased film, The Fantastic Four. He also narrated the film September 11-The New Pearl Harbor by Massimo Mazzucco.

Culp also featured in the neo-noir detective video game L.A. Noire as Walter Robbins in the homicide case "The Studio Secretary Murder".

== Personal life ==
He co-founded the Walking-In-Your-Shoes technique with Joseph Cogswell, a body-mind approach. In 1992, he and Cogswell founded the Walking Theatre Group based in Los Angeles.

He is the uncle of American rapper Bones.

== Filmography ==
=== Film ===
Year	Title	Role	Notes
1986	Dream Lover	Danny	
1988	Iguana	Dominique	
1991	The Arrival	Max Page (young)	
1994	El jardín del Edén	Frank	
1994	The Secret Life of Houses	David	
1994	The Fantastic Four	Victor Von Doom	Unreleased
1995	Apollo 13	TELMU Gold	
1996	Driven	Chiropractic Assistant	
1997	Firestorm	Richter	
2000	Innocents	Mike	
2001	Hunger	Charlie Pontus	
2003	Another Fish	Marcus	Short
2003	Baadasssss!	Attorney	
2007	Cyxork 7	Max Schlau	
2008	Iskyss	James Arlington	
2008	The Seekers	Nick	
2008	The Reflecting Pool	Paul Cooper	
2013	Voice of Life	None	Short
2016	Welcome to the Men's Group	Michael	
2016	Surge of Power: Revenge of the Sequel	Spade	
2017	Abduction of Angie	Luke	
2018	The Empty House	Charles	Short
2019	Surge of Dawn	Spade	
2024	Outlaw Posse	Sheriff	

=== Television ===
Year	Title	Role	Notes
1983	The Greatest American Hero	Roberto Delvera	Episode: "Vanity, Says the Preacher"
1984	A Doctor's Story	Dr. Rick Stockwood	TV film
1989	Highway to Heaven	Paul	Episode: "The Inner Limits"
1990	Blue Bayou	Thomas Fortenot	TV film
1990	Project: Tinman	Reitman	TV film
1993	Full Eclipse	Det. Tom Davies	TV film
1996	Assault on Dome 4	Chase Moran	TV film
1997	ER	Roger Alner	Episode: "You Bet Your Life"
1998	Star Trek: Deep Space Nine	Raimus	Episode: "Honor Among Thieves"
2006	Wild Hearts	Cody McMichael	TV film
2007–2009	Mad Men	Archie Whitman	Guest role (seasons 1–3)
2009	Radio Needles	Bill Dawson	TV film
2010	House	Russ Smith	"Remorse"
2012	Blackout	Langdon	Episode: "Part 1"
2013	New Girl	Mick Jagger (voice)	Episode: "Virgins"
2020	Agents of S.H.I.E.L.D.	Franklin D. Roosevelt	Episode: "The New Deal"

=== Video games ===
Year	Title	Role(s)
2011	L.A. Noire	Walter Robbins
2016	The Technomancer	Anton Rogue
2022	Best Month Ever!	Alvin, Billy, Hutt, Joe, Thomas, Club audience
