= Nina Menkes =

American filmmaker

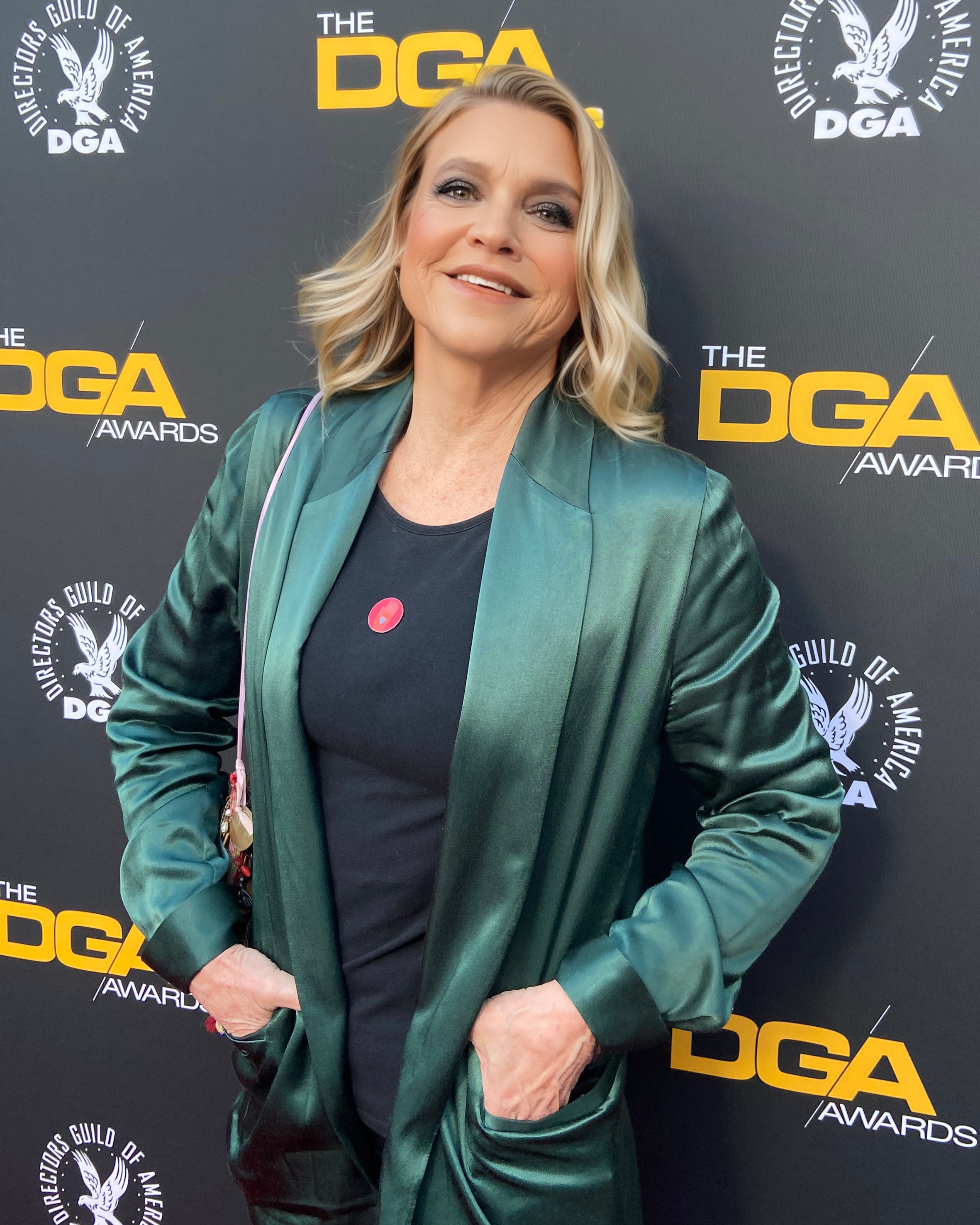
- Menkes in 2025
- Born: Ann Arbor, Michigan
- Education: University of California, Los Angeles (UCLA)
- Occupations: Independent filmmaker; professor
- Years active: 1981–present
- Notable work: Brainwashed: Sex-Camera-Power
- Awards: Guggenheim Fellowship

Nina Menkes (/ˈninə ˈmɛŋkəs/ NEE-nə MENG-kəss) is an American independent filmmaker. Her films include The Great Sadness of Zohara (1983), Magdalena Viraga (1986), Queen of Diamonds (1991), The Bloody Child (1996), "Massacre (Massaker)" (2005), Phantom Love (2007), Dissolution (2010), and Brainwashed: Sex-Camera-Power (2022). Nina Menkes' sister Tinka appears as an actress in many of them. Menkes teaches at the California Institute of the Arts in Santa Clarita, California. She has donated copies of several of her works to the Academy Film Archive.

== Life ==
Menkes was born in Ann Arbor, Michigan to European Jewish parents who fled Nazi persecution as children. She was raised in Berkeley, California. In 1977, she completed a BA from the University of California at Berkeley, and in 1989 completed a Master of Fine Arts at the University of California at Los Angeles. From 1985 to 1989 she taught in the film department of California State University, Northridge, and then, from 1990, at the California Institute of the Arts in Santa Clarita; she became an adjunct professor in film at the University of Southern California in the same year.

== Work ==
Films by Menkes include:

- A Soft Warrior, 1981, an eleven-minute short
- The Great Sadness of Zohara, 1983, which was first shown at the Melnitz Theatre of the University of California, Los Angeles, in 1984, and later in the same year at the Edinburgh International Film Festival and the Mannheim International Film Festival; also in 1984, it was awarded a special jury prize at the San Francisco International Film Festival and a silver medal at the Houston International Film Festival
- Magdalena Viraga, 1986, had its première at Film and Television Archives of the University of California, Los Angeles, and won the Best Independent-Experimental Film Award of the Los Angeles Film Critics Association; it was shown at the Festival du Nouveau Cinéma in Montreal in both 1986 and 1987, and at the Toronto International Film Festival and the Whitney Biennial in 1987.
- Queen of Diamonds, 1990, had its first showing in January 1991 at the Sundance Film Festival in Park City, Utah, and in 1992 was shown at the Munich International Film Festival. Tinka Menkes plays a croupier in a casino in the desert. It was restored by The Film Foundation and the Academy Film Archive in 2018, and was shown at the AFI Fest in November of that year.
- The Bloody Child, 1996, was based on a murder; it was the last film Menkes and her sister Tinka made together, and the last film she made for about ten years.
- Massacre (Massaker), 2005: camera, with co-directors Monika Borgmann, Lokman Slim, Hermann Theissen
- Phantom Love, 2007
- Dissolution (Hitparkut), 2010, was a loose interpretation of Dostoevsky's Crime and Punishment set in a predominantly Arab neighborhood in Tel Aviv, Israel. It was shot in black-and-white.
- Lioness, 2022: Alongside Claire Denis, Ryusuke Hamaguchi, Albert Serra, Narcisa Hirsch and Sergei Loznitsa Menkes was commissioned to make a short film trailer for the 60th anniversary of the Viennale.
- Brainwashed: Sex-Camera-Power (2022), is a documentary on the gendered nature of film language, including interviews with filmmakers and activists such as Catherine Hardwicke, Eliza Hittman, Joey Soloway, Julie Dash, Laura Mulvey, Penelope Spheeris, and Maria Giese.

In 2018 Menkes presented an illustrated talk on "Sex and Power, the Visual Language of Oppression" in several venues, among them the Cannes Film Festival in Cannes and the Sundance Film Festival in Park City, Utah. She built upon this work in creating Brainwashed: Sex-Camera-Power (2022). Brainwashed: Sex-Camera-Power premiered at the Sundance Film Festival, and has been shown at Berlinale CPH:DOX, JEONJU International Film Festival, Beldocs International Film Festival and Docaviv International Documentary Film Festival.

== Reception ==
Menkes became a fellow of the American Film Institute in 1991. She received a Guggenheim Fellowship in 1992, and in 1993 was an artist-in-residence in Berlin under the DAAD Artists-in-Berlin Program.

She has been nominated for a number of awards, and has won:

- 1986, Los Angeles Film Critics Association, Independent/Experimental Film and Video Award for Magdalena Viraga
- 2007, World Film Festival of Bangkok, Special Jury Prize for Phantom Love
- 2010, Jerusalem Film Festival, Anat Pirchi Award for Best Drama for Hitparkut.
- 2019, a lifetime achievement award at the Festival Internacional de Cine de Mar del Plata, where a complete retrospective of her work was also shown.

Two of Menkes' films—Magdalena Viraga and Queen of Diamonds—have been preserved by the Academy Film Archive, in 2012 and 2019, respectively.
