= Looking =

Act of intentionally focusing visual perception on someone or something

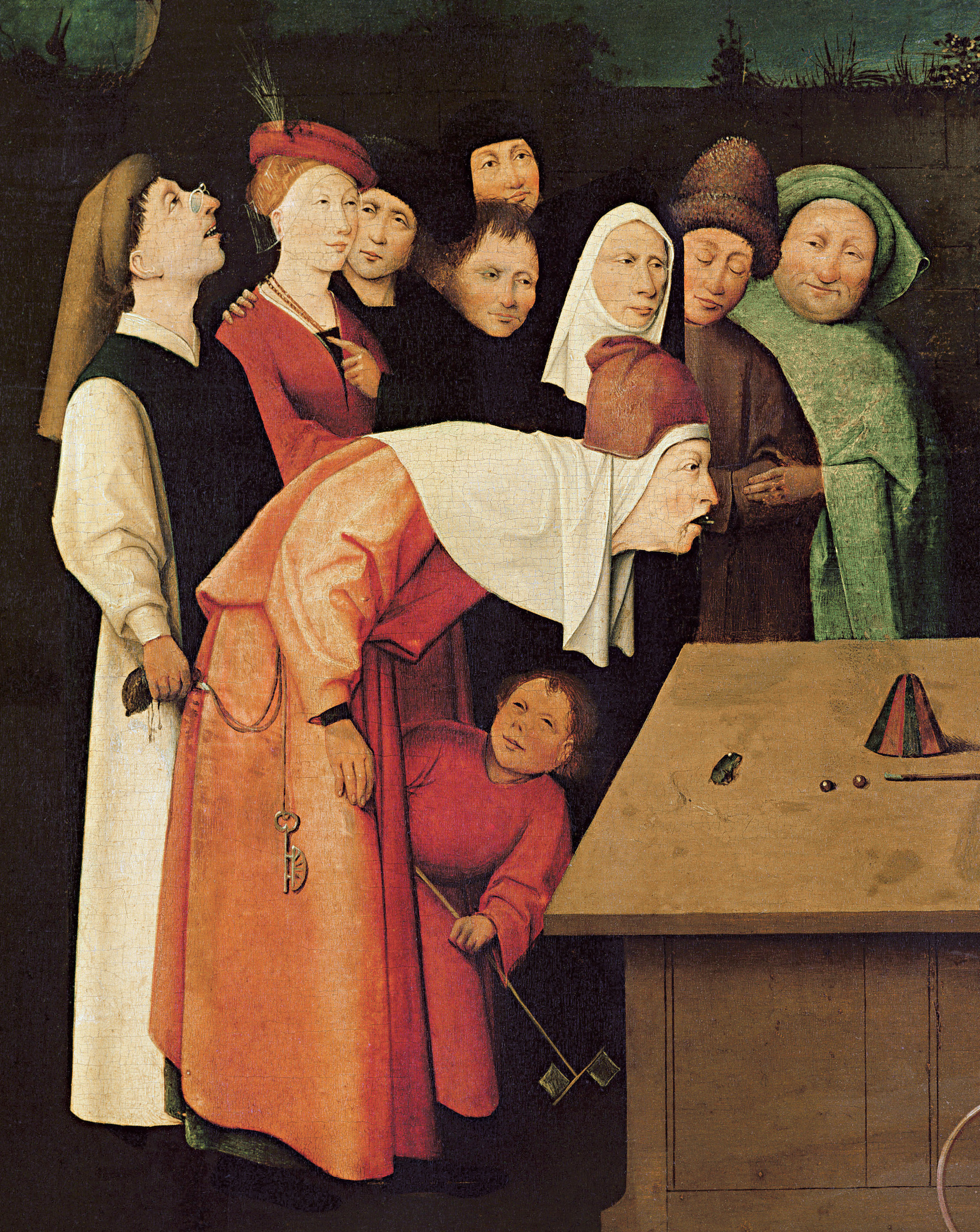
Hieronymus Bosch's The Conjurer. The central figure (the conjurer) looks forward, steadily, intently, and with fixed attention. While other figures observe objects within the painting, and the woman in green appears to observe the viewer.

Looking is the act of intentionally focusing visual perception on someone or something, for the purpose of obtaining information, and possibly to convey interest or another sentiment. A large number of troponyms exist to describe variations of looking at things, with prominent examples including the verbs "stare, gaze, gape, gawp, gawk, goggle, glare, glimpse, glance, peek, peep, peer, squint, leer, gloat, and ogle". Additional terms with nuanced meanings include viewing, watching, eyeing, observing, beholding, and scanning. Looking is both a physical act of directing the focus of the eyes, and a psychological act of interpreting what is seen and choosing whether to continue looking at it, or to look elsewhere. Where more than one person is involved, looking may lead to eye contact between those doing the looking, which raises further implications for the relationship established through that act.

== Looking versus seeing ==
"Looking" and "seeing" are traditionally contrasted in a number of ways, although their usage often overlaps. Looking can be characterized as "the action precedent to seeing". Any kind of looking or viewing actually implies "seeing" certain things within the range of view, while not "seeing" others, because they are unimportant at the moment. Thus, things that are within the range of view, but which are unimportant to the viewer, may be treated by the brain as if they are transparent, by being looked over, past, and around. The distinction between "looking" and "seeing" has been compared to the distinction between hearing and listening, with one being a rote activity and the other requiring a conscious and thoughtful effort to understand what is being seen or heard. Because of the breadth and flexibility of both words, different authors may reverse the relationship in contrasting them, with one suggesting that a person can "look at" something without truly "seeing" it, while another might suggest that a person might be "seeing" something, but not truly "look at" it. Both arrangements suggest that the person is directing their vision towards the thing, but failing to give sufficient attention to notice specific characteristics or implications of what is in the visual field.

== Looking in intense, pronounced, or prolonged ways ==
A number of troponyms exist to illustrate kinds of looking that are either intentionally or unconsciously done in intense, pronounced, or prolonged ways.

"Staring" is an intense form of looking in which the eyes of the person looking remain fixed on the subject for an extended period, and is generally considered rude. "Gazing" has historically implied intensity, but not aggressiveness, and may imply "wonder, fascination, awe, or admiration". In the twentieth century, however, sociologists began to use the term to suggest a power relationship between the person who is gazing and the subject of the gaze, with the former exercising an ability to define the latter. By contrast, glaring does suggest aggressiveness and confrontation. "Eyeing" implies looking at something with some feeling involved, such as desire or wariness.

"Observing" implies looking at a specific object or area for a prolonged period specifically for purposes of observation, with the purpose of looking specifically being to obtain information about the thing being observed without necessarily either judging it or interfering with it. "Watching" implies a similar prolonged focus, but can also imply looking at something in a distracted or absentminded manner, such as watching television.

"Gaping" and "gawking" also indicate prolonged acts of looking, but suggest that the person doing the looking is so mentally distracted by the subject being observed that they become unaware of their own conduct. At the extreme, rubbernecking is the physical act of craning one's neck, performed in order to get a better view, and has been described as a human trait that is associated with morbid curiosity. "Ogling" is an "impertinent" form of staring "often in a way that indicates improper interest". Another synonym, "leering", is often used to imply sexual harassment.

== Looking in quick, subtle, or hidden ways ==
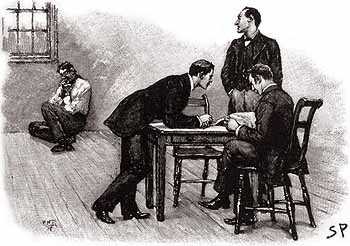
Illustration from the Sherlock Holmes story, "The Adventure of the Stockbroker's Clerk", in The Strand Magazine, March 1893, original captioned "Glancing at the haggard figure".

A number of troponyms exist to illustrate kinds of looking that are either intentionally or unconsciously done in a quick, subtle, or hidden way.

"Glancing" and "glimpsing" are terms that imply looking at things in a subtle way, or seeing things very briefly before they move out of the range of vision. Although the two are often confused, a glance is more commonly a quick movement of the eye, whereas a glimpse is more often a result of the object being watched quickly moving out of sight. "Scanning" suggests quickly looking over an area "to get a general impression", accomplished "by rapidly noting one point after another". Glance appeared as a word prior to 1450, from Old French glacer or glacier, a reference to the quick movement of slipping on ice, and was first recorded as appearing with its current meaning in 1582. Glimpse appeared as a noun with its current meaning in 1580, from Middle English glimsen, and as a verb in 1779, although it was originally associated with seeing bright or shiny things. Playwright Eugene O'Neill was fond of using glance as a stage direction.

"Peeking" and "peeping" suggest looking at something that one is not supposed to be looking at, and doing so in a way that is intended to hide the fact that the person doing the peeking or peeping is looking. There is "an illegitimacy associated with peeping". An aspect of the story of Lady Godiva is Peeping Tom — a tailor who spied on Godiva as she rode naked through her town to protest taxation — and subsequently was punished. Peeping "is in close relation to 'Peeking' — one peeps typically at sexual matters and 'peeks' when one wants surreptitiously to know what something is without being seen".

== See also ==
- Rubbernecking
- Watching-eye effect
