= Staring =

Prolonged gaze or fixed look

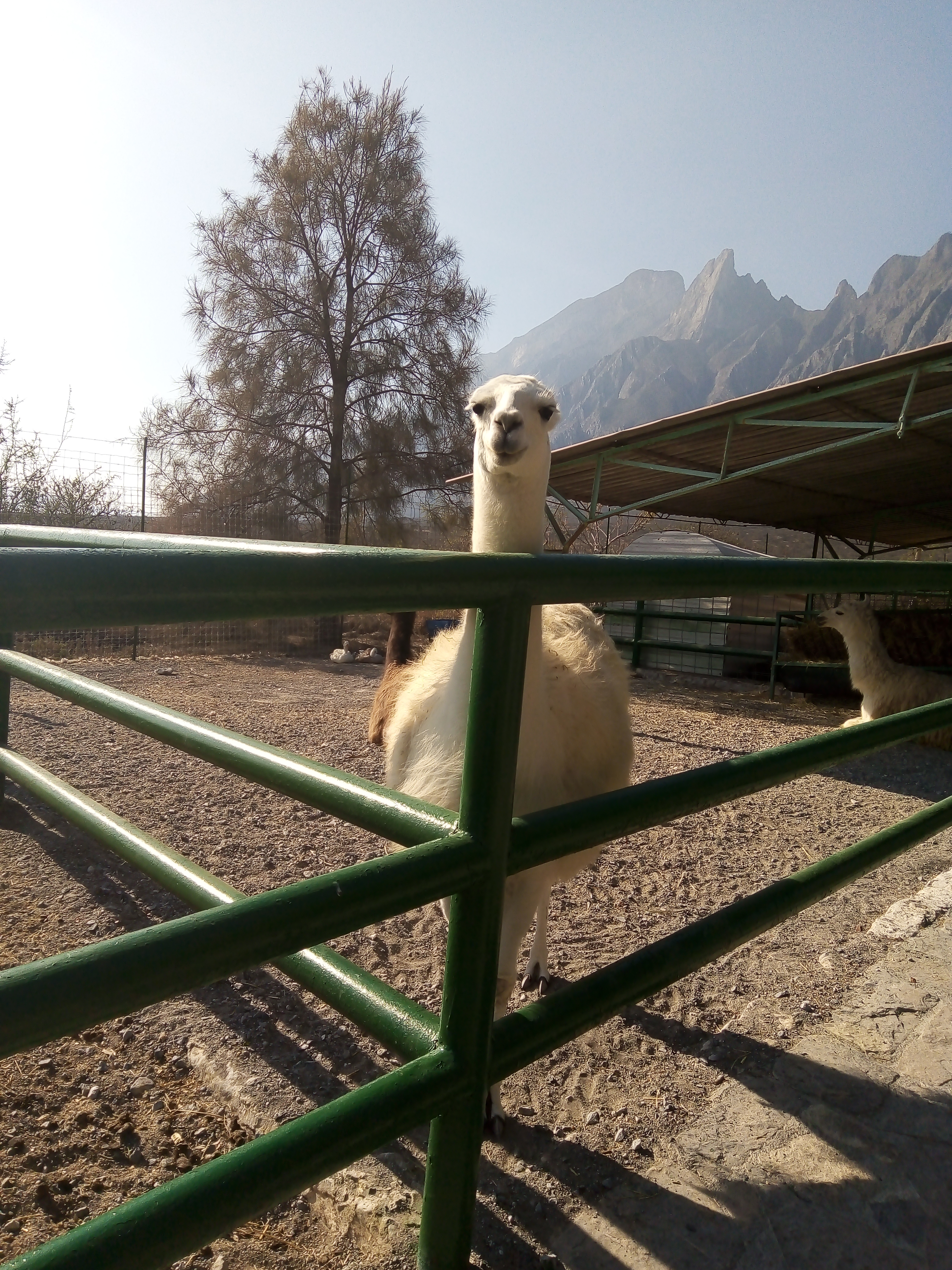
A llama staring at the camera

Staring is a prolonged gaze or fixed look. In staring, one subject or person is the continual focus of visual interest, for a long amount of time. The meaning, purpose, and rudeness, of staring varies widely between cultures. Staring can be interpreted as being either hostile like disapproval of another's behavior, or the result of intense concentration, interest or affection. Staring behavior can be considered as a form of aggression like when it is an invasion of an individual's privacy in certain contexts, or as a nonverbal cue to convey feelings of attraction in a social setting. The resultant behavior or action defines whether it is aggressive in nature (e.g. leering that results in street harassment), passive or active expression of attraction, etc. However, to some extent staring often occurs accidentally, and often a person would be simply staring into a space for awareness, or could be lost in thought (sometimes known as daydreaming), stupefied, or be unable to see. As such, the meaning of a person's staring behavior depends upon the attributions made by the observer.

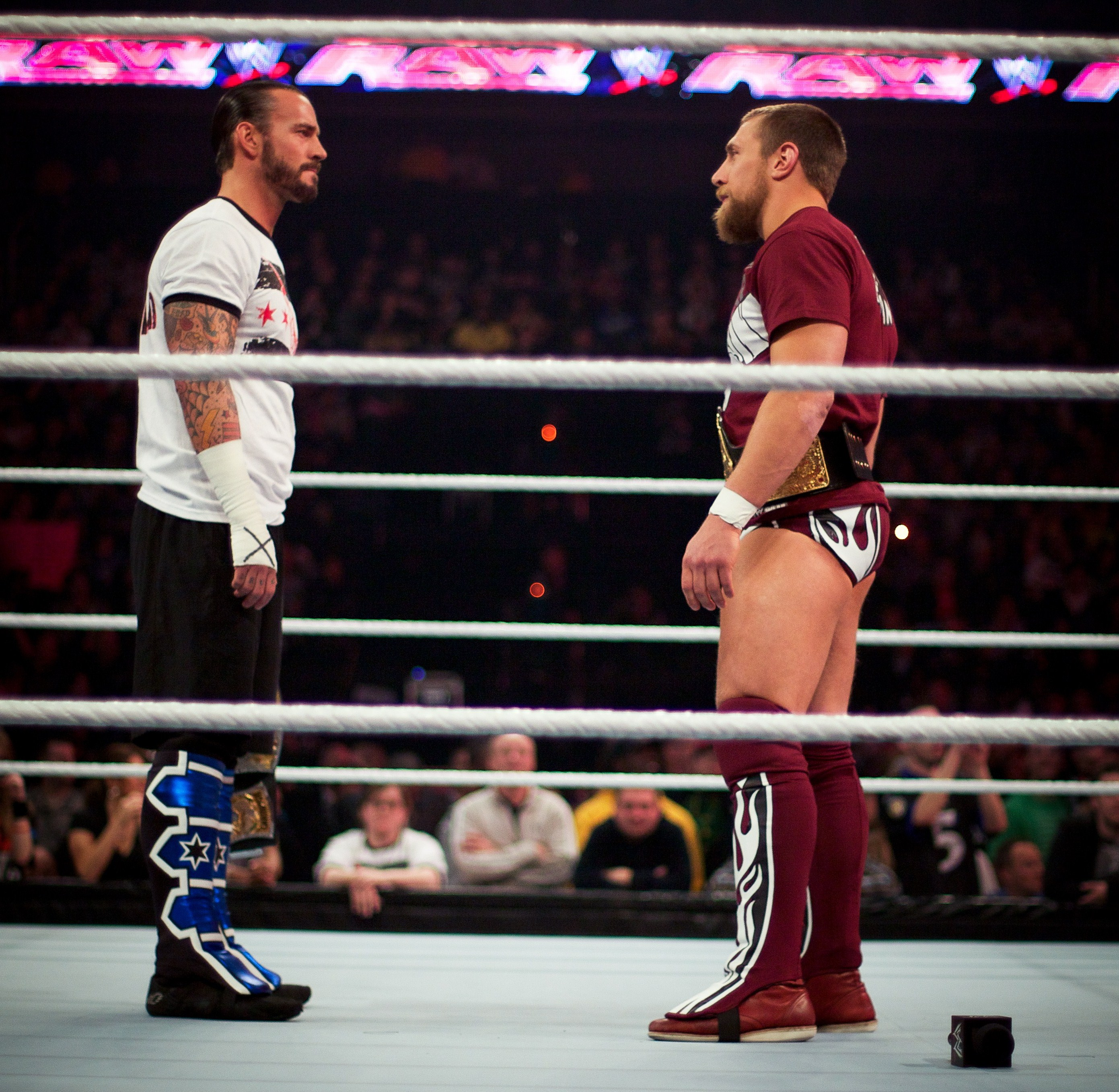
Acted staring, such as in this showdown between CM Punk (left) and Daniel Bryan (right), is sometimes used to convey aggression in professional wrestling.

In a staring contest, a mutual staring can take the form of a battle of wills. When eye contact is reciprocated, it could be an aggressive-dominating game where the loser is the person who looks away first.

Staring conceptually also implies confronting the inevitable – "staring death in the face", or "staring into the abyss". Group staring evokes and emphasizes paranoia; such as the archetypal stranger walking into a saloon in a Western to be greeted by the stares of all the regulars. The fear of being stared at is called scopophobia.

== Social factors ==
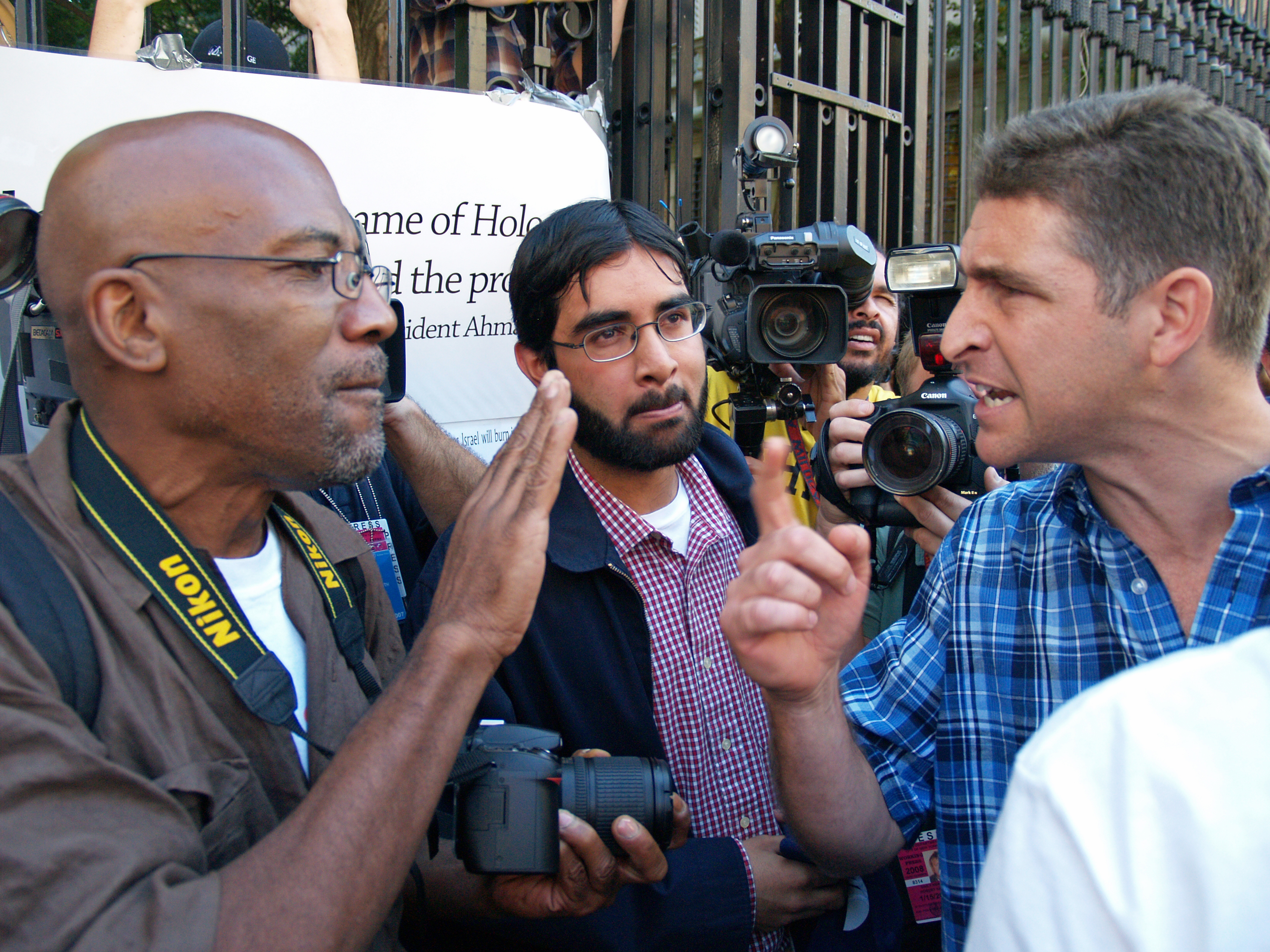
Staring can be interpreted as being either hostile, or the result of intense concentration; above, two men stare at each other during a political argument.

Children have to be socialised into learning acceptable staring behaviour. This is often difficult because children have different sensitivities to self-esteem. Staring is also sometimes used as a technique of flirting with an object of affection. However, being stared at, especially for a prolonged amount of time or very frequently by one person in particular, can cause discomfort to those subjected to it.

Jean-Paul Sartre discusses "The look" in Being and Nothingness, in which the appearance of someone else creates a situation in which a person's subjectivity is transformed without their consent.

== Psychological study ==
The act of staring implies a visual focus, where the subject of the gaze is objectified. This has been the subject of psychoanalytical studies on the nature of scopophilia, with a subsequent development in some aspects of feminist thought (see film, photography and voyeurism). Paradoxically, the notion of staring also implicates the looker in constructing themselves as a subject. Sartre was interested in the individual experiencing shame only when they perceive that their shameful act is being witnessed by another (see The look).

== Staring into the distance ==
Staring need not be directed at a particular person or object, and research indicates that an apparently distant stare does not necessarily indicate attention to whatever lies in the direction of the gaze. Expressions such as staring into space, staring into the distance, staring at nothing, and staring into the middle distance describe looking outward wherein the apparent object of attention is either remote or absent. Staring into the distance, in particular, can simply describe prolonged looking toward something far away, while staring into space generally refers more specifically to looking ahead, but without mentally attending to the surrounding environment. The middle distance is a term from landscape painting describing the part of a view that is neither particularly near nor far away, with the expression, staring into the middle distance, likewise being commonly used to denote a fixed outward gaze with no specific target of attention.

Distant staring behavior can accompany internally directed cognition, indicating attention focused on thoughts, memories, planning, or imagination, rather than obtaining and processing external visual information. Eye-tracking research indicates that internally directed cognition correlates with reduced visual scanning and changes in fixation and vergence, consistent with mental disengagement from the individual's visual environment. A 2023 virtual reality study sought to quantify "staring into the distance", measuring the degree to which viewers focused on the surface in front of them, with greater mental load being associated with a higher degree of what the authors deemed "focus offset", the tendency to act as though participants were looking through nearby surfaces.

One particular iteration of staring into the distance or staring at nothing is the thousand-yard stare, a blank, unfocused gaze of people experiencing dissociation due to acute stress or traumatic events. The phrase was originally used to describe war combatants and the post-traumatic stress disorder (PTSD) they exhibited but is now also used to refer to an unfocused gaze seen in people under a stressful situation, or in people with certain mental health conditions. The thousand-yard stare is often associated with shell shock, combat stress reaction, and other trauma-related mental health conditions.

== Staring contests ==
The line of gaze in a staring contest

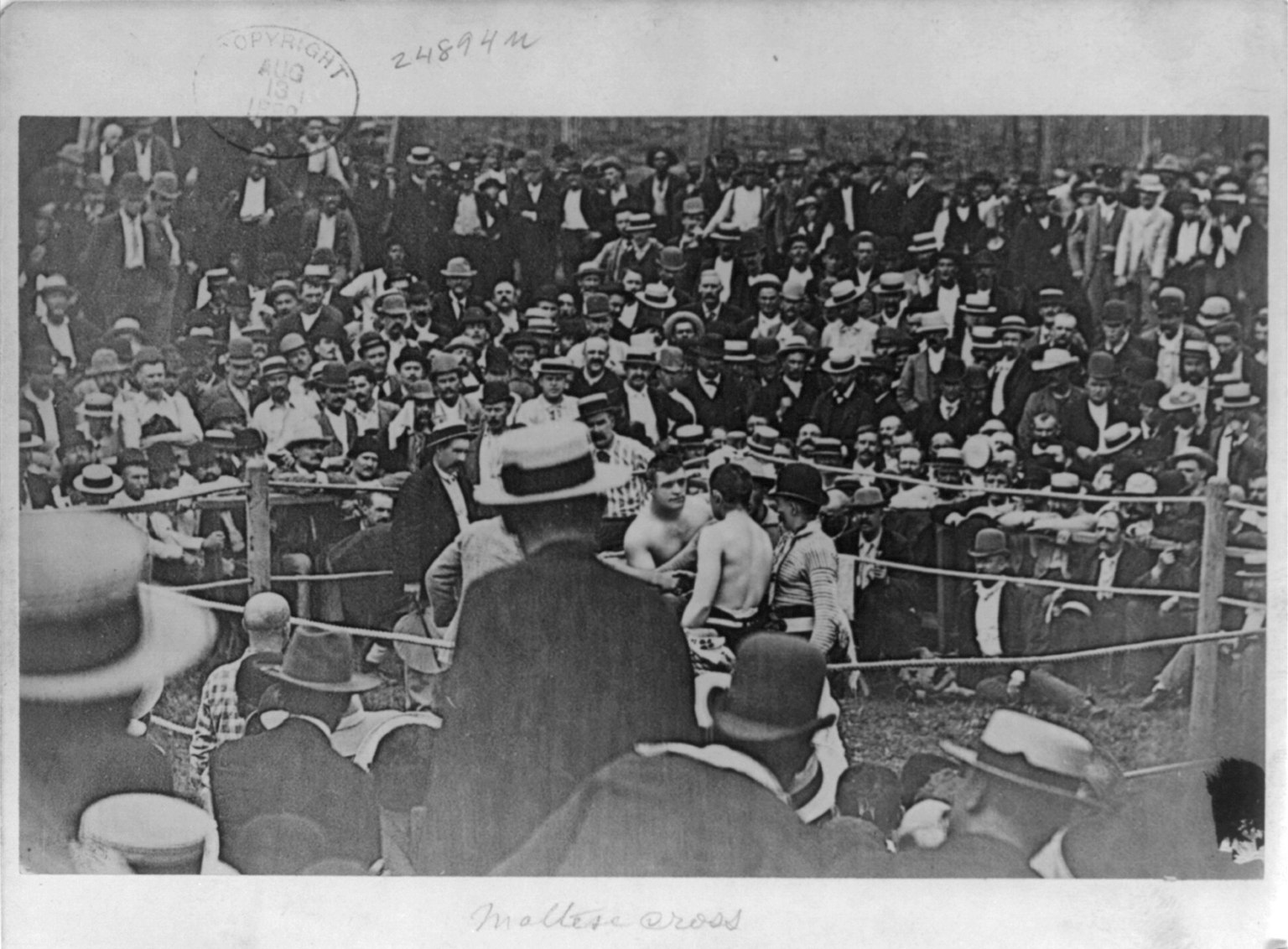
John L. Sullivan stares down Jake Kilrain seconds prior to their prizefight.

A staring contest is a game in which two people attempt to stare at each other for a longer period of time than their opponent can. The game ends when one participant blinks.

There is a popular variation of the game in which the participants must also not smile, creating a physical as well as a psychological challenge. Most other variations revolve chiefly around either of these two core objectives, with some allowing the aggressive use of distracting actions to force an opponent into defeat, while others prohibit virtually any action but staring.

Another, granted uncommon, and is considered by some unsportsman like, is called the "ambush" ruleset, where one participant begins the contest without the opponent initially being aware of it. As soon as eye contact is made, the staring contest has begun, and proceeds according to regular conventions. The contest is allowed to pass without the opponent being aware they were involved.

Staring contests ("Stare-out") were featured as an animation in the first series of surreal BBC television comedy sketch show Big Train (aired in 1998). The animation satirised televised sporting events coverage and its over-excited commentary, inspired by events such as the World Chess Championship, cricket, boxing and the football World Cup. The sketches are set during the World Stare-out Championship Finals, a staring match which is described as a global event broadcast all over the world.

== Inappropriate staring ==
When caught staring, the moment can be a source of embarrassment depending on the reason for staring. For example, in the movie Superbad, the character Fogell is caught staring at a classmate’s exposed thong underwear. After she turns around, he responds nonsensically by providing an answer to a question that was not asked and promptly walks away from her. Here, Fogell felt embarrassment because he was caught doing something socially unacceptable.

== See also ==
- Face-off
- Intimidation
- Stare-in-the-crowd effect
- Thousand-yard stare
