= Scopophobia =

Fear of being stared at

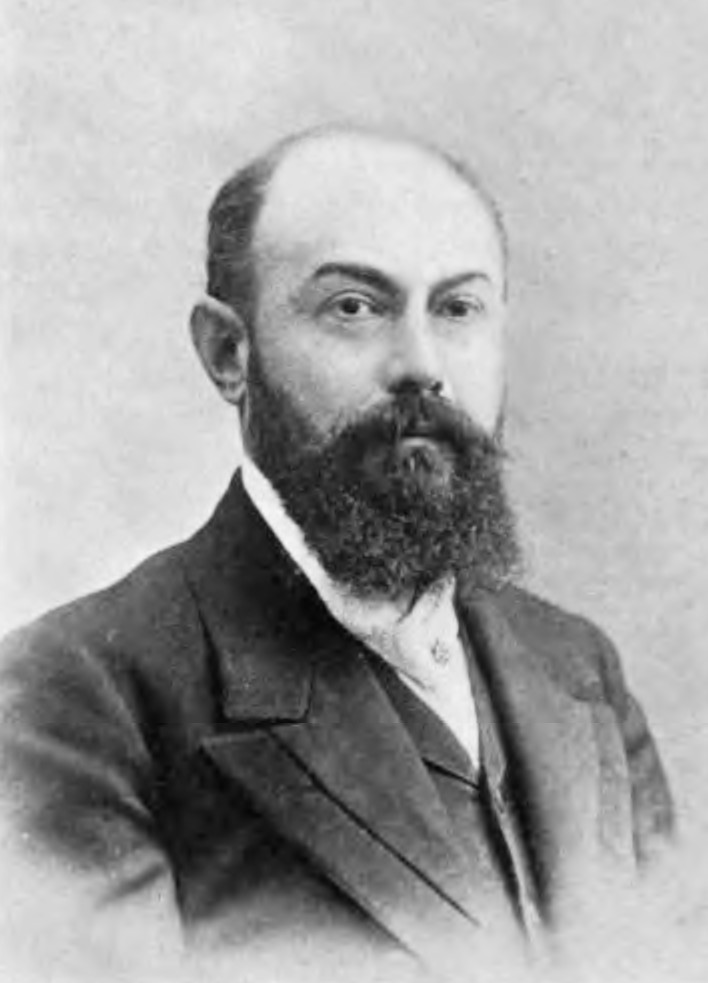
- Pierre Janet, the man who coined the term "scopophobia"
- Specialty: Psychology
- Treatment: Exposure therapy

Scopophobia, scoptophobia, or ophthalmophobia, is an anxiety disorder characterized by an excessive fear of being stared at in public or stared at by others. Scopophobia is also commonly associated with schizophrenia and other psychiatric disorders. Often, scopophobia will result in symptoms common with other anxiety disorders.

== Signs and symptoms ==
Individuals with scopophobia generally exhibit symptoms in social situations when attention is brought upon them, such as in public speaking. Many of the situations which trigger social anxiety also apply to scopophobia, such as: being introduced to new people, being teased and/or criticized, or even answering a phone call in public.

Often scopophobia symptoms resemble those of other anxiety disorders. They include irrational feelings of panic, terror, or dread, rapid heartbeat, shortness of breath, nausea, dry mouth, trembling, anxiety and avoidance. Other symptoms related to scopophobia may be hyperventilation, muscle tension, dizziness, uncontrollable shaking or trembling, excessive eye watering and redness of the eyes. For an epileptic, it may precipitate an attack.

=== Related syndromes ===
Though scopophobia is a solitary disorder, comorbidity with other disorders is common, particularly anxiety disorders. Erythrophobia is a similar phobic response where the patient fears being observed while blushing, and thus avoids social situations where blushing might occur. Sociologist Erving Goffman suggested that shying away from casual glances in the street remained one of the characteristic symptoms of psychosis in public. Another distinct but related condition, scopophilia, is excessive pleasure derived from looking at specific objects or persons, typically when undressing, nude, or engaging in sexual activity.

== Causes ==
Scopophobia has distinct expression and treatment versus most other phobias, as it is both a social phobia and a specific phobia, being a specific occurrence within a social setting. Like most phobias, however, it often arises from a traumatic event in the patient's life, such as intense public ridicule during childhood, or from innate or learned predispositions. Additionally, a scopophobic patient may have a characteristic which draws attention, such as a physical disability, or a physical or verbal behavior outside the norm.

According to the Social Phobia/Social Anxiety Association, U.S. government data for 2012 suggests that social anxiety affects over 7% of the population at any given time. When considering any occurrence across a patient's lifetime, the percentage increases to 13%.

== Psychoanalytic views ==
Building on Sigmund Freud's concept of the eye as an erogenous zone, psychoanalysts have linked scopophobia to a (repressed) fear of looking, as well as to an inhibition of exhibitionism. Freud also referred to scopophobia as a "dread of the evil eye" and "the function of observing and criticizing the self" during his research into the "eye" and "transformed I's."

In some explanations, the equation of being looked at with a feeling of being criticized or despised reveals shame as a motivating force behind scopophobia. In the self-consciousness of adolescence, with its increasing awareness of the Other as constitutive of the looking-glass self, shame may exacerbate feelings of erythrophobia and scopophobia.

== Treatment ==
There are several options for treatment of scopophobia. With desensitization, the patient is stared at for a prolonged period and then describes their feelings. By experiencing the phobic trigger in a safe, controlled environment, the patient's fears may be reduced or even eliminated, or the self-introspection may reveal the underlying cause of the phobia.

Exposure therapy, another common treatment, has five steps:

- Evaluation
- Feedback
- Developing a fear hierarchy
- Exposure
- Building

In the evaluation stage, the scopophobic individual would describe their fear to the therapist and try to find out when and why this fear developed. The feedback stage is when the therapist offers a way of treating the phobia. A fear hierarchy is then developed, where the individual creates a list of scenarios or situations involving their fear, ranked in order of increasing severity. Exposure involves the individual being exposed to the least-severe entries in the hierarchy. Finally, building can occur when the patient has grown accustomed to an entry in the hierarchy, so they move on to the next most severe entries.

Other suggested treatments for scopophobia include hypnotherapy, neuro-linguistic programming (NLP), and energy psychology. In extreme cases of scopophobia, it is possible for the subject to be prescribed anti–anxiety medications. Medications may include benzodiazepines, antidepressants, or beta blockers.

== History ==
Early references to social phobias date to at least 400 BC Hippocrates took notes on an individual with overwhelming shyness, explaining that such a person "loves darkness as light" and "thinks every man observes him.” The term "social phobia" (phobie sociale) was first coined in 1903 by French psychiatrist Pierre Janet. He used this term to describe patients of his who exhibited a fear of being observed as they were participating in daily activities such as talking, playing the piano or writing.

In 1906 the psychiatric journal The Alienist and Neurologist, described scopophobia:

Then, there is a fear of being seen and a shamefacedness, which one sees in asylums. [...] We called it scopophobia — a morbid dread of being seen. In minor degree, it is morbid shamefacedness, and the patient covers the face with his or her hands. In greater degree, the patient will shun the visitor and escape from his or her sight where this is possible. Scopophobia is more often manifest among women than among men.

Later in the same paper (p. 285) scopophobia is defined as "a fear of seeing people or being seen, especially of strange faces".

== Etymology ==
The term scopophobia comes from the Greek σκοπέω skopeō, "look to, examine", and φόβος phobos, "fear". Ophthalmophobia comes from the Greek ὀφθαλμός ophthalmos, "eye".

== See also ==
- Gaze
- Generalized other
- Ideas of reference and delusions of reference
- List of phobias
- Social stigma
- Stage fright
