= Stare-in-the-crowd effect =

The stare-in-the-crowd effect is the notion that an eyes-forward, direct gaze is more easily detected than an averted gaze. First discovered by psychologist and neurophysiologist Michael von Grünau and his psychology student Christina Marie Anston using human subjects in 1995, the processing advantage associated with this effect is thought to derive from the importance of eye contact as a cue for social interactions.

== Description ==
In their 1995 paper published in Perception, von Grünau and Anston demonstrated that staring eyes (straight gaze with iris and pupil in center position in eye socket) are detected faster than eyes gazing to the right or left (averted gaze with iris and pupil in right-most or left-most position in eye socket). Eye targets with a straight gaze, when presented in an array of averted gaze non-targets, are detected faster with fewer errors than an averted gaze targets presented in an array of straight gaze targets.

This search asymmetry, in which straight gaze targets are given preference in an array of averted gaze distractors, is found for both realistically drawn and schematic eye stimuli but not for other arrayed objects. Search asymmetry is not seen with geometric stimuli—for instance 1 x 3 rows of black and white squares—that vary in the position of the distinguishing feature, or stimuli consisting of only one schematic eye.

This effect, which has subsequently been replicated in many different search paradigms, is understood in terms of the evolutionary significance of what is considered to be one of the most critical socio-cognitive abilities of humans and other primates: gaze perception. Gaze perception can manifest itself in two ways depending on context, social group or species.

- Mutual gaze or eye contact in humans, and some other primates, in one context can serve to bond individuals and regulate social interactions through the transmission of expressions of intimacy and filial identity.
- But, in another context, a sustained stare may be interpreted as a sign of hostility or anger—a cue for increased vigilance or aversive action. Staring is a threat gesture in many primate societies and makes most people feel nervous and tense.

Regardless of how it is perceived and subsequently processed cognitively, a directed gaze is a powerful cue for potential synergistic or antagonistic interactions.

According to Darwin (1872) and Gibson (1969), organisms have evolved perceptual sensitivities that maximize their survival. Among these is a visual system that rapidly and reliably identifies and discriminates relevant from irrelevant cues. The stare-in-the-crowd effect is considered to be one of these perceptual abilities: a ‘quick and dirty’ primary process, by means of which an organism can take on board basic facts about the space it shares with others and respond appropriately to maximize its survival and/or the survival of conspecifics with a common filial identity.

It has been speculated that human eye morphology evolved from a necessity for fast and accurate gaze perception for complex social interactions. According to this model, an eye direction detector (EDD) mechanism - a neurocognitive system responsible for the rapid detection of eyes in the environment and their gaze direction – arose as a function of the geometry created by a dark circular iris relative to the white sclera. Specifically, it is contended that the increased ratio of exposed sclera in the eye outline of humans serves to enhance the velocity and acuity of gaze direction perception.
