= Glaring =

Facial expression

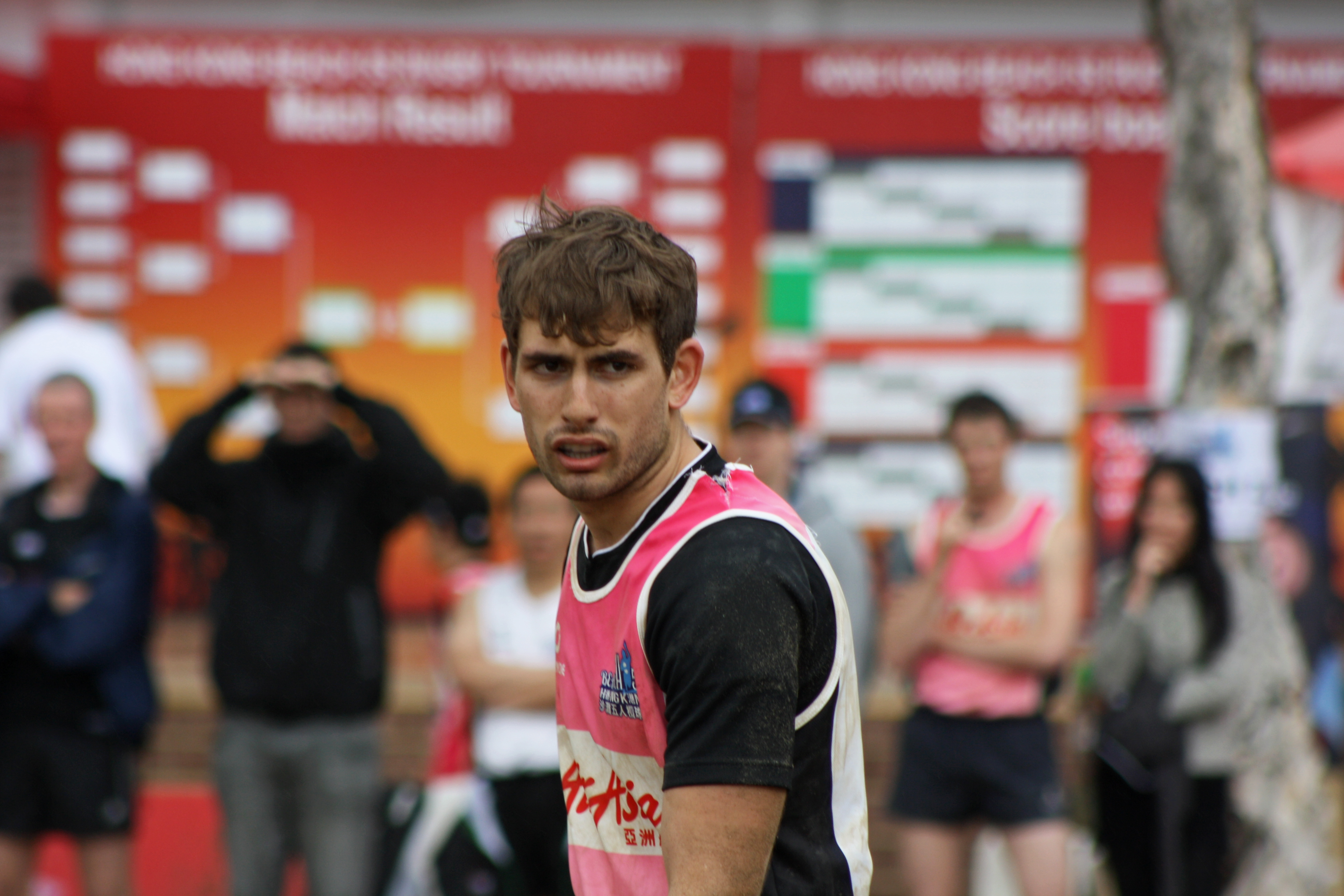
A man glaring at something off-screen

A glare is a facial expression showing disapproval, fierceness and/or hostility. In some cultures, glaring is considered offensive. A glare may be induced by anger or frustration.

Visually, a glaring person tends to have their eyes fixed and heavily focused on a subject. This can sometimes be considered synonymous to staring but, in most cases, staring is caused due to curiosity and lasts only for a short duration, whereas glaring is caused due to contempt and lasts for a relatively longer duration.

== Uses and examples ==
Many people glare at a subject to express disapproval of the physical nature of the subject or ideas that may be expressed by the subject.

Glaring is often used as a simile, like: "Glaring like mad (Aristophanes), Glaring like two gaunt wolves with a famished brood (Mathilde Blind) ... [or] Glaring like a Lion in a cage (O. Henry)." Glaring can be a metaphor, as used in Western esotericism terms, and is Hexagram 52. "Glaring" is used in legal cases to mean blatant, obvious, "threatening", "dangerous", or knowingly, or together in arguments as "glaring and shocking".

Possibly the most common clichés for the past century using glare are "glaring falsehood" and "glaring absurdity", and "glaring and shocking."

== See also ==
- Frown
- Sneer
