= Laura Mulvey =

British feminist film theorist (born 1941)

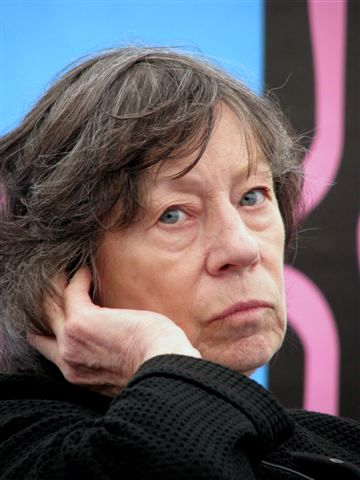
- Mulvey in 2010
- Born: 15 August 1941 (age 85)

Academic background
- Education: St Hilda's College, Oxford

Academic work
- School or tradition: Screen theory Feminist film theory
- Institutions: Birkbeck, University of London
- Main interests: Film studies and media studies
- Notable ideas: Male gaze

Laura Mulvey (born 15 August 1941) is a British feminist film theorist and filmmaker. She was educated at St Hilda's College, Oxford. She is currently Honorary Professor of Film at the University of St. Andrews and Emerita Professor of Film and Media Studies at Birkbeck, University of London. She previously taught at Bulmershe College, the London College of Printing, the University of East Anglia, and the British Film Institute.

During the 2008–09 academic year, Mulvey was the Mary Cornille Distinguished Visiting Professor in the Humanities at Wellesley College. Mulvey has been awarded three honorary degrees: in 2006 a Doctor of Letters from the University of East Anglia; in 2009 a Doctor of Law from Concordia University; and in 2012 a Bloomsday Doctor of Literature from University College Dublin. Mulvey was also awarded a British Film Fellowship in November 2025.

== Film theory ==
Mulvey is best known for her essay "Visual Pleasure and Narrative Cinema", written in 1973 and published in 1975 in the influential British film theory journal Screen. It later appeared in a collection of her essays entitled Visual and Other Pleasures, as well as in numerous other anthologies. Her article, which was influenced by the theories of Sigmund Freud and Jacques Lacan, is one of the first major essays that helped shift the orientation of film theory towards a psychoanalytic framework. According to film scholar Robert Kolker, it "remains a touchstone not only for film studies, but for art and literary analysis as well". Prior to Mulvey, film theorists such as Jean-Louis Baudry and Christian Metz used psychoanalytic ideas in their theoretical accounts of the cinema. Mulvey's contribution, however, inaugurated the intersection of film theory, psychoanalysis and feminism. "Visual Pleasure and Narrative Cinema" helped to bring the term "male gaze" into film criticism and eventually into common parlance. The concept of the "male gaze" had previously been introduced by the English art critic John Berger in his seminal Ways of Seeing, a series of films for the BBC aired in January 1972, and later a book, as part of his analysis of the treatment of the nude in European painting.

Mulvey states that she intends to use Freud and Lacan's concepts as a "political weapon". She employs some of their concepts to argue that the cinematic apparatus of classical Hollywood cinema inevitably put the spectator in a masculine subject position, with the figure of the woman on screen as the object of desire and "the male gaze". In the era of classical Hollywood cinema, viewers were encouraged to identify with the protagonists, who were and still are overwhelmingly male. Meanwhile, Hollywood women characters of the 1950s and 1960s were, according to Mulvey, coded with "to-be-looked-at-ness" while the camera positioning and the male viewer constituted the "bearer of the look". Mulvey suggests two distinct modes of the male gaze of this era: "voyeuristic" (i.e., seeing woman as image "to be looked at") and "fetishistic" (i.e., seeing woman as a substitute for the lack, the underlying psychoanalytic fear of castration).

To account for the fascinations of Hollywood cinema, Mulvey employs the concept of scopophilia. This concept was first introduced by Sigmund Freud in Three Essays on the Theory of Sexuality (1905) and it refers to the pleasure gained from looking as well as to the pleasure gained from being looked at, two fundamental human drives in Freud’s view. Sexual in origin, the concept of scopophilia has voyeuristic, exhibitionistic and narcissistic overtones and it is what keeps the male audience’s attention on the screen. According to Anneke Smelik, Professor of the Department of Modern Languages and Cultures at Radboud University, classic cinema encourages the deep desire to look through the incorporation of structures of voyeurism and narcissism into the narrative and image of the film. As regards the narcissistic overtone of scopophilia, narcissistic visual pleasure can arise from self-identification with the image. In Mulvey’s view, male spectators project their look, and thus themselves, onto the male protagonists. In this manner, male spectators come to indirectly possess the woman on screen as well. Furthermore, Mulvey explores the concept of scopophilia in relation to two axes: one of activity and one of passivity. This "binary opposition is gendered." The male characters are seen as active and powerful: they are endowed with agentivity and the narrative unfolds around them. On the other hand, females are presented as passive and powerless: they are objects of desire that exist solely for male pleasure, and thus females are placed in an exhibitionist role. This perspective is further perpetuated in unconscious patriarchal society.

Furthermore, as regards the fetishistic mode of the male gaze as suggested by Mulvey, this is one way in which the threat of castration is solved. According to Mulvey, the paradox of the image of ‘woman’ is that although they stand for attraction and seduction, they also stand for the lack of the phallus, which results in castration anxiety. As previously stated, the fear of castration is solved through fetishism, but also through the narrative structure. To alleviate said fear on the level of narrative, the female character must be found guilty. To exemplify this kind of narrative plot, Mulvey analyzes the works of Alfred Hitchcock and Josef von Sternberg, such as Vertigo (1958) and Morocco (1930), respectively. This tension is resolved through the death of the female character (as in Vertigo) or through her marriage with the male protagonist (as in Hitchcock’s Marnie, 1964). Through fetishization of the female form, attention to the female "lack" is diverted, and thus, renders women a safe object of pure beauty, not a threatening object.

Mulvey also explores Jacques Lacan’s concepts of ego formation and the mirror stage. In Lacan’s view, children gain pleasure through the identification with a perfect image reflected in the mirror, which shapes children’s ego ideal. For Mulvey, this notion is analogous to the manner in which the spectator obtains narcissistic pleasure from the identification with a human figure on the screen, that of the male characters. Both identifications are based on Lacan’s concept of méconnaissance (misrecognition), which means that such identifications are "blinded by narcissistic forces that structure them rather than being acknowledged."

Different filming techniques are at the service of making voyeurism into an essentially male prerogative, that is, voyeuristic pleasure is exclusively male. As regards camera work, the camera films from the optical as well as libidinal point of view of the male character, contributing to the spectator’s identification with the male look. Furthermore, Mulvey argues that cinematic identifications are gendered, structured along sexual difference. The representation of powerful male characters is opposite to the representation of powerless female characters. Hence, the spectator readily identifies with the male characters. The representation of powerless female characters can be achieved through camera angle. The camera films women from above, at a high camera angle, thus portraying women as defenseless. Camera movement, editing and lighting are used in this respect as well. A case in point here is the film The Silence of the Lambs (1990). Here, it is possible to appreciate the portrayal of the female protagonist, Clarice Starling (Jodie Foster), as an object of stare. In the opening sequence, the elevator scene shows Clarice surrounded by several tall FBI agents, all dressed identically, all towering above her, "all subjecting her to their (male) gaze."

Mulvey argues that the only way to annihilate the patriarchal Hollywood system is to radically challenge and re-shape the filmic strategies of classical Hollywood with alternative feminist methods. She calls for a new feminist avant-garde filmmaking that would rupture the narrative pleasure of classical Hollywood filmmaking. She writes: "It is said that analyzing pleasure or beauty annihilates it. That is the intention of this article."

"Visual Pleasure and Narrative Cinema" was the subject of much interdisciplinary discussion among film theorists, which continued into the mid-1980s. Critics of the article pointed out that Mulvey's argument implies the impossibility of the enjoyment of classical Hollywood cinema by women, and that her argument did not seem to take into account spectatorship not organized along normative gender lines. Mulvey addresses these issues in her later (1981) article, "Afterthoughts on 'Visual Pleasure and Narrative Cinema' inspired by King Vidor's Duel in the Sun (1946)", in which she argues a metaphoric 'transvestism' in which a female viewer might oscillate between a male-coded and a female-coded analytic viewing position. These ideas led to theories of how gay, lesbian, and bisexual spectatorship might also be negotiated. Her article was written before the findings of the later wave of media audience studies on the complex nature of fan cultures and their interaction with stars. Queer theory, such as that developed by Richard Dyer, has grounded its work in Mulvey to explore the complex projections that many gay men and women fix onto certain female stars (for example, Doris Day, Liza Minnelli, Greta Garbo, Marlene Dietrich, and Judy Garland).

Another point of criticism over Mulvey's essay is the presence of gender essentialism in her work; that is, the idea that the female body has a set of attributes that are necessary to its identity and function and that is essentially other to masculinity. Then, the question of sexual identity suggests opposed ontological categories based on a biological experience of genital sex. As a result, affirming that there is an essence to being a woman contradicts the idea that being a woman is a construction of the patriarchal system.

Regarding Mulvey's view of the identity of the gaze, some authors questioned "Visual Pleasure and Narrative Cinema" on the matter of whether the gaze is really always male. Mulvey does not acknowledge a protagonist and a spectator other than a heterosexual male, failing to consider a woman or homosexual as the gaze. Other critics pointed out that there is an oversimplification of gender relations in "Visual Pleasure and Narrative Cinema". According to them, Mulvey's essay shows a binary and categorical division of genders into male and female. This view does not acknowledge theoretical postulates put forward by LGBTQ+ theorists—and the community itself—that understand gender as something flexible.

Additionally, Mulvey is criticized for not acknowledging other than white spectators. From this viewpoint, by not recognizing racial differences, when Mulvey refers to "women", she is only speaking about white women. For some authors, Mulvey does not consider the black female spectators who choose not to identify with white womanhood and who would not take on the phallocentric gaze of desire and possession. Thus, Mulvey fails to consider that these women create a critical space outside of the active/male passive/female dichotomy.

Feminist critic Gaylyn Studlar wrote extensively to problematize Mulvey's central thesis that the spectator is male and derives visual pleasure from a dominant and controlling perspective. Studlar suggested rather that visual pleasure for all audiences is derived from a passive, masochistic perspective, where the audience seeks to be powerless and overwhelmed by the cinematic image.

Mulvey later wrote that her article was meant to be a provocation or a manifesto, rather than a reasoned academic article that took all objections into account. She addressed many of her critics, and clarified many of her points, in "Afterthoughts" (which also appears in the Visual and Other Pleasures collection).

Mulvey's most recent book is titled Death 24x a Second: Stillness and the Moving Image (2006). In this work, Mulvey responds to the ways in which video and DVD technologies have altered the relationship between film and viewer. No longer are audience members forced to watch a film in its entirety in a linear fashion from beginning to ending. Instead, viewers today exhibit much more control over the films they consume. In the preface to her book, therefore, Mulvey begins by explicating the changes that film has undergone between the 1970s and the 2000s. Whereas Mulvey notes that, when she first began writing about films, she had been "preoccupied by Hollywood's ability to construct the female star as ultimate spectacle, the emblem and guarantee of its fascination and power," she is now "more interested in the way that those moments of spectacle were also moments of narrative halt, hinting at the stillness of the single celluloid frame." With the evolution of film-viewing technologies, Mulvey redefines the relationship between viewer and film. Before the emergence of VHS and DVD players, spectators could only gaze; they could not possess the cinema's "precious moments, images and, most particularly, its idols," and so, "in response to this problem, the film industry produced, from the very earliest moments of fandom, a panoply of still images that could supplement the movie itself," which were "designed to give the film fan the illusion of possession, making a bridge between the irretrievable spectacle and the individual's imagination." These stills, larger reproductions of celluloid still-frames from the original reels of movies, became the basis for Mulvey's assertion that even the linear experience of a cinematic viewing has always exhibited a modicum of stillness. Thus, until a fan could adequately control a film to fulfill his or her own viewing desires, Mulvey notes that "the desire to possess and hold the elusive image led to repeated viewing, a return to the cinema to watch the same film over and over again." However, with digital technology, spectators can now pause films at any given moment, replay their favourite scenes, and even skip the scenes they do not desire to watch. According to Mulvey, this power has led to the emergence of her "possessive spectator." Films, then, can now be "delayed and thus fragmented from linear narrative into favorite moments or scenes" in which "the spectator finds a heightened relation to the human body, particularly that of the star." It is within the confines of this redefined relationship that Mulvey asserts that spectators can now engage in a sexual form of possession of the bodies they see on screen.

Mulvey believes that avant-garde film "poses certain questions which consciously confront traditional practice, often with a political motivation" that work towards changing "modes of representation" as well as "expectations in consumption." Mulvey has stated that feminists recognise modernist avant-garde "as relevant to their own struggle to develop a radical approach to art."

== Phallocentrism and patriarchy ==
Mulvey incorporates the Freudian idea of phallocentrism into "Visual Pleasure and Narrative Cinema". Using Freud's thoughts, Mulvey insists on the idea that the images, characters, plots and stories, and dialogues in films are inadvertently built on the ideals of patriarchies, both within and beyond sexual contexts. She also incorporates the works of thinkers including Jacques Lacan and meditates on the works of directors Josef von Sternberg and Alfred Hitchcock.

Within her essay, Mulvey discusses several different types of spectatorship that occur while viewing a film. Viewing a film involves unconsciously or semi-consciously engaging the typical societal roles of men and women. The "three different looks", as they are referred to, explain just exactly how films are viewed in relation to phallocentrism. The first "look" refers to the camera as it records the actual events of the film. The second "look" describes the nearly voyeuristic act of the audience as one engages in watching the film itself. Lastly, the third "look" refers to the characters that interact with one another throughout the film.

The main idea that seems to bring these actions together is that "looking" is generally seen as an active male role while the passive role of being looked at is immediately adopted as a female characteristic. It is under the construction of patriarchy that Mulvey argues that women in film are tied to desire and that female characters hold an "appearance coded for strong visual and erotic impact". The female actor is never meant to represent a character that directly affects the outcome of a plot or keep the story line going, but is inserted into the film as a way of supporting the male role and "bearing the burden of sexual objectification" that he cannot.

== As a filmmaker ==
Mulvey was prominent as an avant-garde filmmaker in the 1970s and 1980s. With Peter Wollen, her husband, she co-wrote and co-directed Penthesilea: Queen of the Amazons (1974), Riddles of the Sphinx (1977), AMY! (1980), Crystal Gazing (1982), Frida Kahlo and Tina Modotti (1982), and The Bad Sister (1982).

Penthesilea: Queen of the Amazons was the first of Mulvey and Wollen's films. In this film, Mulvey attempted to link her own feminist writings on the Amazon myth with the paintings of Allen Jones. These writings concerned themes such as male fantasy, symbolic language, women in relation to men and the patriarchal myth. Both filmmakers were interested in exploring ideology as well as the "structure of mythologizing, its position in mainstream culture and notions of modernism."

With Riddles of the Sphinx, Mulvey and Wollen connected "modernist forms" with a narrative that explored feminism and psychoanalytical theory. This film was fundamental in presenting film as a space "in which the female experience could be expressed."

AMY! was a film tribute to Amy Johnson and explores the previous themes of Mulvey and Wollen's past films. One of the main themes of the film is that women "struggling towards achievement in the public sphere" must transition between the male and female worlds.

Crystal Gazing exemplified more spontaneous filmmaking than their past films. Many of the elements of the film were decided once production began. The film was well received but lacked a "feminist underpinning" that had been the core of many of their past films.

The last films of Mulvey and Wollen as a team, Frida Kahlo and Tina Modotti and The Bad Sister revisited feminist issues previously explored by the filmmakers.

In 1991, Mulvey returned to filmmaking with Disgraced Monuments, which she co-directed with Mark Lewis. This film examines "the fate of revolutionary monuments in the Soviet Union after the fall of communism."

== See also ==
- Female gaze
