= Scopophilia =

Sexual pleasure derived from looking at object or person

In psychology and psychiatry, scopophilia or scoptophilia (Ancient Greek: σκοπέω skopeō, "look to", "to examine" + φῐλῐ́ᾱ philíā, "the tendency towards") is an aesthetic pleasure drawn from looking at an object or a person. In human sexuality, the term scoptophilia describes the sexual pleasure that a person derives from looking at prurient objects of eroticism, such as pornography, the nude body, and fetishes, as a substitute for actual participation in a sexual relationship.

== Psychoanalysis ==
As explained by psychoanalyst Jacques Lacan, Sigmund Freud used the term scopophilia to describe, analyze, and explain the concept of Schaulust, the pleasure in looking, a curiosity which he considered a partial-instinct innate to the childhood process of forming a personality; and that such a pleasure-instinct might be sublimated, either into Aesthetics, looking at objets d'art or sublimated into an obsessional neurosis "a burning and tormenting curiosity to see the female body", which afflicted the Rat Man patient of the psychoanalyst Freud. From that initial interpretation of Schaulust arose the psycho-medical belief that the inhibition of the scopic drive might lead to actual, physical illness, such as physiologic disturbances of vision and eyesight. In contrast to Freud's interpretation of the scopic drive, other psychoanalytic theories proposed that the practices of scopophilia might lead to madness — either insanity or a mental disorder — which is the scopophilic person's retreat from the concrete world of reality into an abstract world of fantasy.

The theoretic bases of scopophilia were developed by the psychoanalyst Otto Fenichel, in special reference to the process and stages of psychological identification. That in developing a personal identity, "a child, who is looking for libidinous purposes ... wants to look at an object in order [for it] to 'feel along with him'." That the impersonal interaction of scopophilia (between the looker and the looked-at) sometimes replaced personal interactions in the psychological life of a person who is socially anxious, and seeks to avoid feelings of guilt.

Lacan's conceptual development of the gaze linked the pleasure of scopophilia to the person's apprehension of the Other (person) who is not the Self; that is: "The gaze is this object lost, and suddenly re-found, in the conflagration of shame, by the introduction of the Other." The practice of scopophilia is how a person's desire is captured by the imaginary representation of the Other. Theories alternative to Lacan's interpretations of scopophilia and the gaze proposed that a child's discovery of genital difference, and the accompanying anxiety about not knowing the difference of the Other sex, is the experience that subsequently impels the child's scopic drive to fulfil the desire to look and to look at.

== Literary examples ==
- The Satyricon (The Book of Satyr-like Adventures, AD 1st c.), by Gaius Petronius Arbiter, presents the scopophilic description of a priestess of Priapus as the woman who was "the first to put an inquisitive eye to a crack she had naughtily opened, and spy on their play with prurient eagerness."
- In Don Quixote (1605) by Miguel de Cervantes Cardenio takes his false friend Fernando to Luscinda's window so they could observe her surreptitiously: "showed her to him one night by the light of a taper at a window, where we used to converse together. She appeared to him, though in an undress, so charming as to blot out of his memory all the beauties he had ever seen before" For Frederick A. de Armas, the window frames a scene that recalls the erotic paintings of the Renaissance, exhibited in Spanish palaces, thus heightening the scopophilia through works of art
- Secret Sexualities: A Sourcebook of 17th and 18th Century Writing (2003), by Ian McCormick, shows that transgressive sexuality is composed of the inter-relationships between the public and the private spheres and between the open and the secret aspects of a person's life. The example is Memoirs of a Woman of Pleasure (1749), in which the protagonist Fanny Hill gives her scoptophilic observations of two sodomites, which include descriptions of the furnishings and the décor of the room in which they are copulating: " .. . at length I observed a paper patch of the same colour as the wainscot, which I took to conceal some flaw; but then it was so high that I was obliged to stand upon a chair to reach it, which I did, as soft as possible, and, with a point of a bodkin, soon pierced it, and opened myself espial room sufficient. And now, applying my eye close, I commanded the room perfectly, and could see my two young sparks romping and pulling one another about, entirely, to my imagination, in frolic and innocent play.”

== Race ==
Critical race theorists, such as bell hooks, Shannon Winnubst, and David Marriott present and describe scopophilia and the scopic drive as the psychological and social mechanisms that realize the practices of Other-ing a person to exclude them from society (see also scopophobia). The social practice of scopophilia is supposed to fix the appearance and identity of the Other (person), who is not the Self, by way of the gaze that objectifies and dehumanizes them as "not I" and thus "not one of us". In that vein, the practices of cultural scopophilia restrict the number and type of visible representations of "outsiders" in a society.

== Cinema ==
In Psycho (1960), directed by Alfred Hitchcock, the protagonist Norman Bates is a voyeur whose motel rooms feature peepholes. In the course of the story, the motel manager Norman spies upon the anti-heroine as she undresses in her ostensibly private room. (Hitchcock actually first touches on the topic of voyeurism from both the character's and the audience's point of view in 1954's Rear Window.) In Peeping Tom (1960), directed by Michael Powell, scopophilia is mentioned as a psychological affliction of the protagonist, Mark Lewis. As narrative cinema, Peeping Tom is a deliberate exercise in voyeurism for the protagonist and for the spectator, which demonstrates how readily the protagonist and the spectator are mentally willing and morally capable of watching atrocities (torture, mutilation, death) that should not be gazed upon as narrative movies. The mentally ill protagonist acted as he acted consequent to severe mental mistreatment in boyhood, by his film-maker father; the paternal abuse mentally malformed Mark into a reclusive, introverted man comfortable with torturing and killing people.

In the 1970s, parting from Lacan's propositions, psychoanalysts of the cinema used the term scopophilia to identify and to describe the aesthetic and emotional pleasures (often pathological), and other unconscious mental processes that occur in the minds of spectators gazing at a film. Yet voyeurism and the male gaze are psychological practices basic to the spectators' emotional experience of viewing mainstream, commercial cinema; notably, the male gaze is fully presented, described, and explained, and contrasted with the female gaze, in the essay "Visual Pleasure and Narrative Cinema" (1975), by Laura Mulvey. Subsequent scholars have challenged Mulvey's influential reading of scopophilia as both a "gross reduction of the erotic and the aesthetic to the politics of representation" as well as underestimating the power of feminine jouissance in the sexual economy of desire.

== See also ==
- Evil eye
- Eye contact
- Feminist film theory
- Photograph of famed women, one's intense gaze in fixed glance upon the other
- Gaze
- I'll show you mine if you show me yours
- Lady Godiva
- Primal scene
- Scopophobia
- Voyeurism
