= Network era =

Period in American television history, 1950s–1980s

In television broadcasting, the network era, also known as the Silver Age of television, refers to the period in American television history from the end of the first Golden Age of Television in the late 1950s to the beginning of the multi-channel transition in the mid-1980s. During this era, the Big Three television networks—ABC, CBS, and NBC—dominated American television. This determination is established by institutional aspects that regularized television for the majority of the country, including color television, made standard by the late 1960s. As the arrival of new technologies emerged, it offered television viewers more choice and control. This eventually ended the network era and forced viewers to move into the multi-channel transition, leading to the post-network era and second Golden Age of Television.

== Origins and technological limitations ==
Early television evolved from the network organization of radio in the early 1940s. Three of the four networks that rose to dominance, NBC, CBS, and ABC, were corporations that were based in the business center of New York City; the fourth was the Mutual Broadcasting System, a cooperative of radio stations that, though its member stations entered television individually, never had a counterpart television network. These three networks were first established by radio and played a significant role in postwar American identity. During the Golden Age, when television itself was still a niche market, experimental programs were more common; as the medium matured, there was no incentive for these corporations to take further financial risk in creating shows that catered to niche audiences. The first (and, for several decades, only) network built exclusively for television was the DuMont Television Network, which ceased regular programming in 1955 and even during its heyday was a distant fourth in viewership. (DuMont has a corporate descendant in the modern Fox network, the formation of which was a key moment in the end of the network era.)

Conventions that defined the network era such as the television set, antenna and 30-second advertisements were not established immediately. Film studios and independent television producers had only three possible places to sell their media, so they were forced to comply with the practices established by the networks. Early television, like early radio, had only one advertiser that usually sponsored a single program. However, after the quiz show scandals of the late 1950s had exposed the danger of such a business model, the networks eliminated that format and changed to multiple corporations purchasing commercials. In the 1950s, the network-era advertising style turned into a single-sponsorship style (a situation in which a single corporation finances the costs that could have been earned if advertising were sold to sponsors; it also allows more cinematic television) with corporations becoming more focused on selling a product rather than an image. With this change, the broadcasters had more control over the network because they had a magazine-style format for advertisers. Thirty-second advertisements dominated during the network era. While initially the single-sponsorship system worked, it soon became clear that this advertising strategy could not afford to pay for the continuous production cost. Scandals also became an issue with this system and this only further contributed to the development of a new advertising model called the "participation format." For all involved (except the viewers), the participation format proved to be a far more beneficial advertising format. Not only was this system more cost-sufficient in the production of television, but networks also began to have a broader blend of advertisers.

Television viewers of the network era had very few choices and extremely limited technology—unlike AM and shortwave signals that could use skywave propagation to cover large radii, television stations were largely limited to line-of-sight from the transmitter; the wide bandwidth (6 MHz, compared to just 0.01 MHz for an AM radio station and 0.2 MHz for FM radio) heavily limited the choices in a given geographic area, especially given the relatively narrow VHF television band that the Federal Communications Commission allotted for television. The opening of the UHF television band and the All-Channel Receiver Act attempted to resolve this problem, but the UHF bands did not transmit as far with the same broadcast power and were at a competitive disadvantage to the long-established Big Three affiliates, which were on the VHF band in the largest markets. The viewers were receptive to the fact that there was limited programming choices and had to base their daily duties around the television schedule that the networks had mandated. Despite obvious setbacks, the television was cutting-edge technology that created a huge demand for everyone in the United States to purchase one. By 1970, only 32 percent of homes had more than one television set in the United States. Television programming was strictly uniform and these basic characteristics contributed to the programming strategies used throughout the network era.

A fundamental aspect of the network era was the limited ability of networks to reach viewers, which defined how the television (in essence) was used. Distribution windows were numbered as a result of producers reselling original-run episodes to international markets, independent stations and broadcast affiliates to combat the costs of deficit financing. During the network era, the limited number of distribution windows created a bottleneck for new shows. Producers only sold series either to networks or to local stations, which allowed only a limited amount of programming to get through to viewers. Without personal recording capabilities and few alternative ways to receive programming, viewers had little opportunity to rescreen content on their own terms.

== Characteristics and criticism ==
Television, however, was not just a technology but also a set of experiences and practices associated with viewing it. During the Network Era, television acted as a cultural institution. It communicated values and ideas within a culture.

Networks selected programs that would reach a wide range of people, such as family sitcoms, police procedurals, and game shows. The game shows in particular featured newer, bawdier and rowdier formats that challenged previous norms in the genre. However, networks still directed their programs to the white middle class. Rural Americans were a major target audience in the 1960s, and rural sitcoms and Westerns were among television's most popular shows in that decade; advertiser objections to targeting a relatively poor segment of the population led to the rural purge, an early 1970s shift in programming tastes that eliminated most shows of rural interest in favor of more urbane, socially conscious shows that drew a more prosperous audience. The programming of much of the early post-Golden Age network era was noted for its poor quality and campy gimmicks. The network era featured extremely limited program genres and people became accustomed to the way television was. In 1975, the FCC struck an agreement with the Big Three networks and the National Association of Broadcasters to establish a Family Viewing Hour in primetime, limiting content in that key time slot to family-friendly content; it was ruled unenforceable less than two years later.

Efforts were made to break the hegemony of the Big Three networks beginning in 1971, particularly with the establishment of two rules: the Financial Interest and Syndication Rules (fin-syn) and the Prime Time Access Rule (PTAR). Fin-syn effectively forced the networks to divest their syndication arms and archival program libraries. PTAR prohibited the networks from programming the earlier fringe hour of prime time and forced individual stations to program the hour themselves. In practice, most shows were purchased from syndicators or episodes of existing network daytime series (especially game shows), which were exempt from fin-syn because they were not aired in prime time, produced specially for syndication using the same sets and production staff as the mainline run. Fin-syn was repealed in 1993, leading the networks to re-establish syndication wings and reacquire their backcatalogs over time; PTAR was phased out by the 1990s, but the networks have never resumed programming the fringe time slot directly because they now own the syndicators whose programming is used in those slots.

== End of the era ==
Beginning in the early 1980s and continuing into the 1990s, the growing ubiquity of technologies such as the remote control, videocassette recorders (VCRs), cable television, and fiber-optic networks weakened the distribution bottleneck by offering viewers easier access to a wider variety of content than was previously available. With the remote control, viewers were able to easily change the channel without leaving their seat, previously a more physical task. VCRs allowed users to time shift their favorite programs to a more convenient viewing time, as well as the ability to purchase or rent pre-recorded content from stores and video rental shops. With cable TV, as well as new broadcast networks such as Fox, The WB, and UPN, consumers also had much more choice in live programming, which led to a slow audience shift away from the major networks toward the more risqué or specialized content of fledgling channels. With the cost of adding content reduced, network owners profit from programs that create any increase in use, however tiny. Niche programmers no longer needed to produce enough content to fill a channel all day, and can now put any amount of it on a server, from one program to hundreds, and charge viewers as much as the market will bear.

The "big three" networks (ABC, NBC, and CBS), now faced with more competition for advertisers, shifted their programming focus. Rather than the broad, generic content they had previously offered, the networks pivoted towards more targeted content based on age, gender, and ethnicity demographics, intending to win back more audience share from their competitors. Research suggests that, however many channels there are, people watch only seven or so. But the more channels they have, the less likely it is that ABC, for example, will be among the seven. As viewers were freed from the inconvenience of schedules, and as cable and telephone firms encroached on the distribution end of the TV business, the broadcast networks ended up standing or falling purely as content providers. This gradual change of content, along with other emerging technologies such as DVDs and streaming television, ushered in the Second Golden Age of Television.

== See also ==
- 1950s in television
- 1960s in television
- 1970s in television
- 1980s in television
- Least objectionable program
- Saturday-morning cartoon
- Television and the Public Interest
- List of shows from the network era
- High culture
- Low culture
