= Jiggle television =

Television which uses the sexuality of young women as appeal to their audiences

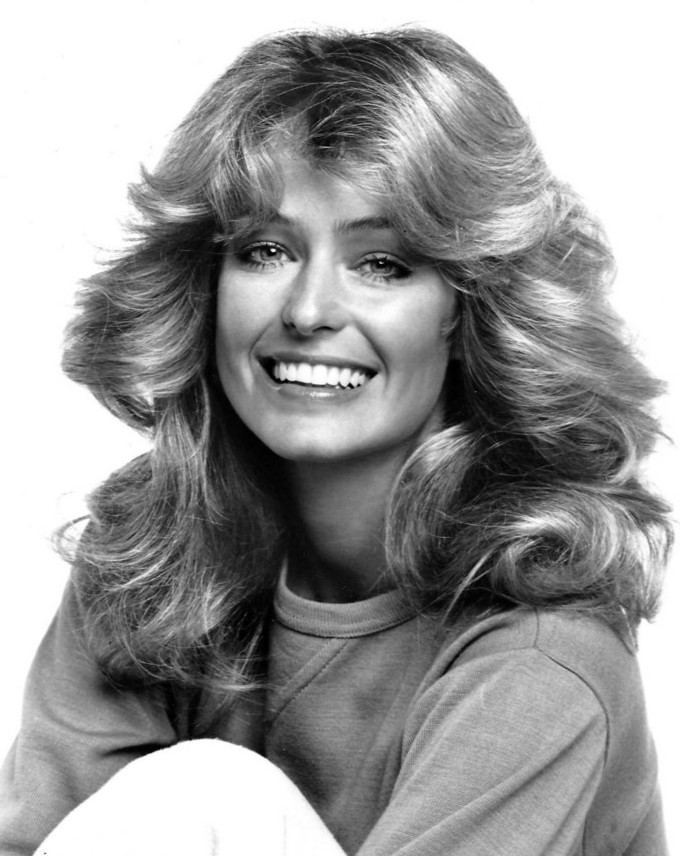
Farrah Fawcett, from the 1970s series Charlie's Angels

Jiggle television is a term coined by NBC executive Paul Klein to criticize ABC's television production and marketing strategy under Fred Silverman, describing the use of female television characters who wear loose clothing or underwear in a way that their breasts or buttocks appear to shake or "jiggle".

== Description ==
Klein referred to ABC's programs as "porn" in order to tap into the 1970s moral panic and anxiety over the spread of pornography, using the neologism to describe the use of female television celebrities wearing loose clothing or underwear in a way in which their breasts or buttocks appear to shake, or "jiggle". An American invention, it was used to refer to programs such as Charlie's Angels, Wonder Woman and Three's Company, which used the sexuality of young women as appeal to their audiences.

== Characteristics ==
The programs' plots were often full of innuendo and suggestive language, and unrealistic in nature. Producers of such series would make sure that its lead actresses would appear in a bikini, one-piece swimsuit, négligée, underwear, or naked under a towel, in each show. Angie Dickinson, star of NBC's Police Woman (1974–1978), which preceded and influenced Charlie's Angels, said that although "essentially a woman’s job is being a woman", by the show's last season, she was tired of scenes "where the phone rings while I'm taking a bath". Due to censorship standards of the time, however, programs made for U.S. television that fell into the "jiggle television" category were not allowed to move beyond innuendo or slight suggestiveness, with actual nudity and sexual content generally not allowed.

== Reception and legacy ==
At the time, the ABC target audience was 18 to 35 years old. Jiggle was also called "tits & ass television" or "T & A" for short and in the 1970s, the amount of sex on television increased, as did its ratings, creating social controversies and consequences.

James T. Aubrey produced a TV movie about the Dallas Cowboys Cheerleaders, which Variety later said "aired on ABC to huge ratings at the height of its T&A phase". The concept was later taken to new extremes by the late 1980s and throughout the 1990s and early 2000s on such television shows as Baywatch, She Spies, and numerous USA Network series.

The term has been used to describe the dramatic television series of Aaron Spelling such as The Love Boat, Fantasy Island, Charmed and others. Jiggle TV is seen as trashy and escapist entertainment. Programs or female performers are often judged by their "jiggle factor" and many, such as Pamela Anderson, had their bodies surgically modified to increase it. The term "jiggle-o" is used to describe a character which uses jiggle factor, and "jiggle syndrome" refers to the phenomenon as a whole.

When the show was number three, I figured it was our acting. When it got to be number one, I decided it could only be because none of us wears a bra.

— Farrah Fawcett on Charlie's Angels

== See also ==
- Sexploitation film
- Network era
