= RMG Connect =

- Company type: Private
- Industry: Advertising, Relationship marketing
- Founded: 2002
- Headquarters: New York City
- Key people: Philip Greenfield
- Number of employees: 900 (2008)
- Website: www.rmgconnect.com

RMG Connect was the relationship marketing division of J. Walter Thompson, developing solutions both online and offline in direct marketing, interactive marketing and sales promotion.

== Overview ==
As of December 2009, RMG Connect had more than 900 employees in 22 countries and 32 offices. The CEO of RMG Connect Worldwide was Philip Greenfield. He and North American President Mark Miller were terminated in March 2009 as new Worldwide Director for Digital at JWT and RMG, David Eastman, began his reorganization. In 2018, JWT was merged with fellow WPP agency Wunderman/Thompson and after subsequent mergers ceased to exist.

== Awards ==
In January 2006, RMG Connect was named #7 on Adweek's annual list of the top 50 Interactive Agencies.

== Services ==
- Strategy - Customer relationship management consulting
- Direct marketing - acquisition, cross-selling, up-selling, telemarketing, response advertising, niche marketing, loyalty marketing
- Data & Analytics - data generation, data management, segmentation & profiling, modelling, targeting, list broking
- Digital marketing - website, extranet, intranet, e-CRM, advertising, e-mail, viral, multimedia
- Promotions - brand, trade, retail, point of sale

== Offices ==
Asia-Pacific

In the Asia Pacific region, RMG Connect can be located in Hong Kong, Beijing, Bangalore, Chennai, Gurgaon, Mumbai, Singapore, Sydney and Tokyo.

North America

RMG Connect's North American offices are located in Atlanta, Dallas, Miami, Minneapolis, New York City, Toronto and Vancouver.

South America

RMG Connect's Latin American officers are in Curitiba and São Paulo.

Europe, Middle East and Africa

Throughout Europe, the Middle East and Africa, RMG Connect's offices can be found in Athens, Brussels, Cape Town, CasablancaDublin, Dubai, London, Madrid, Milan, Paris, Prague, Stuttgart, Vienna, and Zürich.

== See also ==
- Advantage Solutions
- Amalgamated Advertising
