= Television and the Public Interest =

1961 speech by Newton N. Minow

Minow in 1963, on the right. With him are Thurgood Marshall (left) and Hyman G. Rickover.

"Television and the Public Interest" was a speech given by Federal Communications Commission (FCC) chairman Newton N. Minow to the convention of the National Association of Broadcasters on May 9, 1961. Popularly known as the "Vast Wasteland speech", it was Minow's first major speech after he was appointed chairman of the FCC by then President John F. Kennedy.

== Summary ==
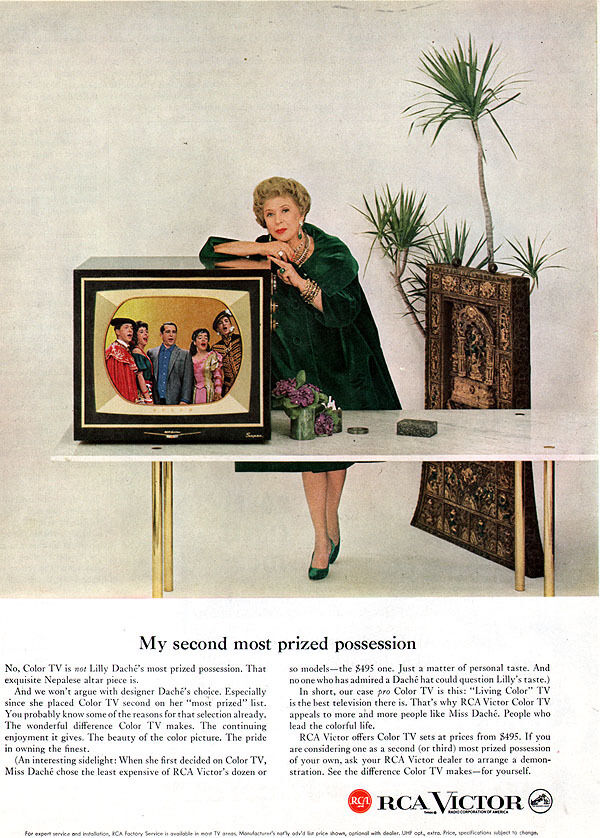
Advertisement for color television with Lilly Daché, 1959. On the screen is opera singer Cyril Ritchard, an example of high culture on television.

In the speech, Minow referred to American commercial television programming as a "vast wasteland" and advocated for programming in the public interest. In hindsight, the speech addressed the end of a Golden Age of Television that had run through the 1950s, contrasting the highbrow programs of that decade (Minow specifically cited Westinghouse Studio One and Playhouse 90, both of which had ended in the previous few years, as examples of "the much bemoaned good old days," and later cited Kraft Television Theatre, Victory at Sea, See It Now, and Peter Pan as examples of quality bygone programs) with what had appeared on American television in 1960 and 1961.

Minow mentioned a handful of praiseworthy shows that were still in production (among them The Twilight Zone, variety specials by Fred Astaire and Bing Crosby, live news and sports coverage, and some documentaries), then warned that such programs were the exception rather than the rule:

When television is good, nothing—not the theater, not the magazines or newspapers—nothing is better.

But when television is bad, nothing is worse. I invite each of you to sit down in front of your own television set when your station goes on the air and stay there, for a day, without a book, without a magazine, without a newspaper, without a profit and loss sheet or a rating book to distract you. Keep your eyes glued to that set until the station signs off. I can assure you that what you will observe is a vast wasteland.

You will see a procession of game shows, formula comedies about totally unbelievable families, blood and thunder, mayhem, violence, sadism, murder, western bad men, western good men, private eyes, gangsters, more violence, and cartoons. And endlessly, commercials—many screaming, cajoling, and offending. And most of all, boredom. True, you'll see a few things you will enjoy. But they will be very, very few. And if you think I exaggerate, I only ask you to try it.

Minow went on to dismiss the idea that public taste was driving the change in programming, stating his firm belief that if television choices were expanded, viewers would gravitate toward higher culture programming; he conceded that in most cases, viewers would choose a Western over a symphony, but responded that it was the television licensees' responsibility to give the options, regardless of ratings. He noted that a large majority of prime time television—59 out of 73 hours—consisted of undesirable television genera: quiz shows, movies, variety shows, sitcoms, and action-adventure series, the last of which included espionage thrillers and the then-ubiquitous Westerns. He stated that "most young children today spend as much time watching television as they do in the schoolroom" and that cartoons and violence typical of children's television of the era was wholly unacceptable, comparable to feeding a child nothing but "ice cream, school holidays and no Sunday school." He also used newspapers as a comparison, noting that although comic strips and advice columns were newspapers' most popular items, they were not featured on the front pages because (according to Minow) the newspapers were still voluntarily bound to the public interest despite being outside the purview of the FCC, something Minow believed television had abandoned as it had become too beholden to Nielsen Ratings. Foreseeing the eventual advent of satellite television, he believed that, if foreign audiences were to witness American television as it existed in 1960, they would be embarrassed.

Minow conceded that there were numerous barriers to improvement, many of them financial, and expressed his reluctance to use the FCC as a censor, except to enforce rules imposed following recent scandals in the quiz show genre and payola in music radio. A partial solution Minow proposed was the expansion of non-commercial educational television, which was not yet as widespread as the major broadcast networks. He was also a staunch believer in the promise of UHF television and hoped that its implementation would allow network options to double; he also promised not to stifle pay television in its infancy, conceding that he could not predict the outcome of such experiments, only that he hoped it would provide opportunities to serve niche markets in addition to those offering mass appeal. He also indicated he would crack down on what had been pro forma license renewals and hold public hearings in stations' cities of license, where he anticipated viewers could answer whether their stations served public interest.

In his speech Minow also shared advice to his audience:

Television and all who participate in it are jointly accountable to the American public for respect for the special needs of children, for community responsibility, for the advancement of education and culture, for the acceptability of the program materials chosen, for decency and decorum in production, and for propriety in advertising. This responsibility cannot be discharged by any given group of programs, but can be discharged only through the highest standards of respect for the American home, applied to every moment of every program presented by television. Program materials should enlarge the horizons of the viewer, provide him with wholesome entertainment, afford helpful stimulation, and remind him of the responsibilities which the citizen has toward his society.

He closed by paraphrasing Kennedy's "ask not what your country can do for you, ask what you can do for your country."

== Reception ==
The phrase "vast wasteland" was suggested to Minow by his friend, reporter and freelance writer John Bartlow Martin. Martin had recently watched twenty consecutive hours of television as research for a magazine piece, and concluded it was "a vast wasteland of junk". During the editing process, Minow cut the words "of junk".

Minow often remarked that the two words best remembered from the speech are "vast wasteland", but the two words he wished would be remembered are "public interest".

According to television historians Castleman and Podrazik (1982), the networks had already purchased their fall 1961 programs and had locked in their 1961–62 schedules at the time Minow had made his speech, leaving them unable to make the adjustments Minow had hoped. "The best the networks could do was slot a few more public affairs shows, paint rosy pictures for 1962–63, and prepare to endure the barrage of criticism they felt certain would greet the new season." Castleman and Podrazik noted that there was an attempt to increase documentary programming in the 1962–63 season, but that "their sheer number diluted the audience and stretched resources far too thin to allow quality productions each week," resulting in a schedule that much resembled "business as usual." 1962 saw an even greater increase in some of the formats Minow detested, with premises becoming more and more surreal: two prime time cartoons (Beany and Cecil and The Jetsons) and sitcoms with outlandish premises (such as hillbillies becoming rich and moving to Beverly Hills in The Beverly Hillbillies, or a veterinarian getting mistakenly drafted and sent to Paris in Don't Call Me Charlie!) were among the new offerings.

The speech was not without detractors, as that lambasting of the state of United States television programming prompted Sherwood Schwartz to name the boat on his television show Gilligan's Island the S. S. Minnow after Newton Minow. Game show host Dennis James remarked in 1972 that Minow's assertion that viewers naturally gravitated toward highbrow programming was proven false, noting that although "the critics will always look down their noses," lowbrow forms of entertainment such as game shows "have a tremendous appeal" to the average American. He indirectly referenced Minow in the interview, quipping "they can talk about the great wasteland and everything else—if you want to read books, read books." James's employer at the time, Mark Goodson, defended his approach to television, remarking to David Susskind ""What do you do that is so distinctive and so much better than what I do?" and in response to the negative reaction to Goodson's shows, "I regret it and I resent it."

In a 2011 interview marking the 50th anniversary of the speech, Minow stated that consumer choice, fueled by the 1980s multi-channel transition, was the most important improvement in television in the decades since his speech; he lamented that this increased choice had eliminated the shared experience of the medium. Writing for Wired Magazine, Matthew Lasar pointed out:

Like so many media reformers, Minow strikes me as reluctant to acknowledge an obvious difference between 1961 and 2011. TV is not a vast wasteland anymore. It's a crazy, weed-filled, wonderful, out-of-control garden.

== See also ==
- Golden Age of Television
- Network era
- Dumbing down
- Public television
- Regulations on children's television programming in the United States
- High culture
- Low culture
