= Multi-channel transition =

The multi-channel transition was a period in the history of television that spanned from the early 1980s to the late 1990s. During this period, multichannel television became popular in much of the world. Many changes happened during this transition, such as the invention of the remote control, the video cassette player, and analog cable systems expanding viewers' choice and control. This era gave viewers more choice and control over what and when they wanted to view a program. Viewers were able to defy the networks' schedules, because they could record the program and watch it whenever they wanted, using the VCR and later the DVR. Producers adjusted to the government regulations and networks lost some of the control they had over program creation. Subscription channels emerged with no advertisements and the method for measuring audiences became more precise with the people meter, with broadcasters fundamentally changing their approaches to programming to accommodate the new device. In the United States, the transition effectively marked the end of the network era, a period in which the three major networks (ABC, CBS and NBC) dominated the industry. Once the transition was complete, the post-network era followed, which included a canon of critically acclaimed series known as the Second Golden Age of Television.

== Background ==
New broadcast networks emerged such as Fox in 1986, The WB in 1995 and the UPN in 1995 and all added great competition to the original networks, NBC, ABC, and CBS. The percentage of people who watched network television dropped from 90% to 64% in the 1980s. During the 1990s, in spite of the new broadcast competitors, viewers carried on to switch from prime time viewing to cable, even though the rate wasn't as high as before. Still, broadcast networks (ABC, CBS, Fox, NBC, The WB, and UPN) gathered an average of only 58 percent of those watching television at the end of the 1999–2000 season, and only 46 percent in the final of the 2004–2005 season.

The remote control became standard on most television sets in the 1980s and that helped the viewers break away from the network era. The VCR further helped viewers to break away from the network era by enabling them to record a program and view it when they wanted to. The VCR also allowed people to build personal libraries. All of these new technologies allowed the viewer greater choice and control over specific media.

The emergence of so many new networks and channels changed the type of programming produced in order to gain more ratings points. Producers and advertisers were now able to target specific people and appeal to a narrower group. The variety show genre, in particular, was made obsolete by the change; none has lasted more than a single season since 1991, and the genre remains one of the least frequently seen in reruns. The ability for cable channels to succeed with smaller audiences made broadcasters' mission more difficult, because viewers now had the option to choose which program would satisfy their needs. Even though cable was readily available, that didn't mean that the viewer would receive every channel they wanted. Cable was then broken down into separate tiers and cable companies offered different packages for different geographic areas. In practice, a single cable provider held an exclusive franchise over any given territory; it was not until the debut of direct broadcast satellites and their much larger channel capacities that they faced any substantial competition. Cable allowed viewers to have special interest in certain programs. The viewers found what channels or shows they liked best once cable was introduced.

The introduction of cable networks allowed for a channel to carry a uniform lineup nationwide without individual stations preempting them. In practice, most cable stations operated with the intent of a nationwide audience to ensure the broadest possible reach. Regional sports networks were the most commercially successful exceptions. These networks built their program lineups around the schedules of their Major League Baseball, National Hockey League and National Basketball Association franchises, which regularly played multiple nights a week, along with whatever major college sports rights could be had in the era (since such broadcasts were decentralized in 1984 with NCAA v. Oklahoma striking down the NCAA's collective sports contracts as unlawful). With regional sports networks, sports telecasts no longer had to pre-empt a broadcast station's regularly scheduled prime time lineup to be seen on television.

During the network era there were only three networks NBC, ABC, and CBS. With the multi-channel transition production companies now had the upper hand with more networks to buy their shows. Where once the networks had control the production companies now held control. In order to maintain their own viability, the major networks lobbied the FCC to repeal the Financial Interest and Syndication Rules, which had separated syndicators from networks in 1971; the FCC obliged in 1991, allowing more vertical integration.

Must-carry and retransmission consent were introduced in the United States with the Cable Television Consumer Protection and Competition Act of 1992. Must-carry guaranteed full-powered broadcast stations a place on cable lineups in their designated market area if they agreed to offer it for free; retransmission consent gave those same stations the option to instead charge a per-subscriber fee to cable providers (passed on to the subscribers' cable bills), with the inverse being that said stations would not be carried on said systems if the cable provider refused the fee. Retransmission consent has not been universally accepted outside the United States; in neighboring Canada, the introduction of an equivalent fee-for-carriage system was preemptively struck down by that country's Supreme Court in 2012.

== New distribution during the multi-channel transition ==
During the multi-channel transition, distribution windows expanded to include cable networks, direct sale on VCR tapes, and then DVD and VOD (Video on demand). More recently they have also come to encompass Internet websites, where episodes can be downloaded or streamed. There has been such a high growing variety of ways for networks to reach viewers, which has also decreased some of the risk of unconventional programs, because new distribution routes provide opportunities to make money on shows that fail to achieve high ratings during network runs. Internet distribution also provides a venue for additional and supplemental programming.

Before the multi-channel transition, only signals broadcast over the air could be received on television in the home. Later, a range of possibilities developed. Cable television and satellite television became common mechanisms of delivery, and companies such as AT&T and Verizon also joined the competition of distribution during the mid-2000s. In 2006, broadband internet distribution of video became overwhelmingly popular, which diminished the domination of cable and satellite as the only source for most channels to be able to reach the home.

== See also ==
- History of television
- Golden Age of Television (1947–1960)
- Golden Age of Television (1999–2023)
- 1980s in television
- 1990s in television
- Network era
- Post-network era
- Multichannel television in the United States
- Streaming television
