= RMG =

RMG could apply to any

- A common abbreviation for ready-made garment
- Bangladeshi RMG Sector, ready-made garments
- Royal Mail Group, London Stock Exchange symbol
- RMG Connect, former division of JWT, US
- Revolutionary Marxist Group (Canada), 1970s political organization
- RMG (program), electronic structure simulation
- Team RMG, a German auto racing team
- Rhenish Missionary Society (RMG), a former Protestant missionary society

== Technology and military ==
- RMG, a multipurpose variant of Russian RPG-27 rocket launcher

== Entertainment ==
- RMG (band)
- Rover's Morning Glory, radio talk-show by WMMS, Cleveland, Ohio, US
