= Promotus Advertising =

- Industry: Advertising and Promotions
- Headquarters: Indianapolis, Indiana
- Key people: Bruce Bryant, President
- Products: Advertising, Media Services, Strategic Planning; Production, Promotion
- Website: www.promotusadv.com

Promotus Advertising, located in Indianapolis, Indiana, was started by Bruce Bryant in 1983. The company provides strategic planning, creative services, production services, and account management.

== Background ==
Promotus Advertising was founded during a time when there were very few African Americans working in the advertising business and no African American owned agencies. Promotus used this fact to position itself as an urban and ethnic marketing firm. It is a strategy that has sustained the agency. Revenue increased to just over $8 million for 2008 and the agency has been given local and national awards.

== See also ==
- Amalgamated Advertising
