= Amanda D. Lotz =

American-Australian educator, television scholar

Amanda Lotz
- Born: 1974 (age 51–52)
- Known for: Popularizing the terms network era, post-network era, and the multi-channel transition

Academic background
- Education: DePauw University (B.A., 1996); Indiana University Bloomington (M.A., 1997); University of Texas (Ph.D., 2000)
- Doctoral advisor: Horace Newcomb

Academic work
- Discipline: Television studies, media studies, media economics
- Institutions: Queensland University of Technology; University of Michigan; Denison University; Washington University in St. Louis

Amanda D. Lotz (born 1974) is an American-Australian educator, television scholar, and media scholar based in Australia since 2019.

She is known for her research in television studies, digital disruption, and the economics of television and media companies, and for popularizing the terms network era, post-network era, and multi-channel transition, the latter describing the television industry's transition to cable and to internet video distribution.

Lotz is professor at Queensland University of Technology and program leader of the Transforming Media Industries research program in QUT's Digital Media Research Centre. Prior to joining QUT, she was a professor of communication studies at the University of Michigan, an assistant professor at Denison University, and a Mellon Postdoctoral Fellow at Washington University in St. Louis.

Her area of research focuses on the intersection of media business and media culture, which she has developed through detailed examination and by developing (with Timothy Havens) a framework for investigating media industries. Her work also spans the economics of the television/cable industry, broadband distributed media, television studies, and gender and the media. She began an agenda of audience/user research in 2025.

== Career ==
She holds a B.A. in communication from DePauw University; an M.A. in telecommunication from Indiana University Bloomington; and a Ph.D. in radio, television and film from University of Texas.

Lotz co-hosted the Media Business Matters podcast, which focused on recent stories in media and why they matter, from 2016 to 2018. She was a fellow at the Peabody Media Center and was named as a fellow of the International Communication Association in 2020.

== Awards and honors ==
- International Communication Association Fellow
- Peabody Fellow Scholar
- National Association of Television Program Executives Faculty Fellow
- National Association of Television Program Executives Faculty Development Grant
- International Radio and Television Society Coltrin Professor of the Year
- Academy of Television Arts & Sciences Foundation Faculty Seminar
- DePauw University Phi Beta Kappa

== Books ==
=== Author ===
- Redesigning Women: Television After the Network Era (University of Illinois Press, 2006)
- The Television Will Be Revolutionized (New York University Press, 2007)
  - Revised second edition published in 2014
- Television Studies (with Jonathan Gray, Polity, 2011)
  - Revised second edition published in 2018
- Understanding Media Industries (with Timothy Havens, Oxford University Press, 2011)
  - Revised second edition published in 2016
- Portals: A Treatise on Internet-Distributed Television (University of Michigan Library, 2017)
- We Now Disrupt This Broadcast: How Cable Transformed Television and the Internet Revolutionized It All (MIT Press, 2018)
- Media Industry Studies (with Daniel Herbert and Aswin Punathambekar, Polity, 2020)
- Media Disrupted: Surviving Pirates, Cannibals and Streaming Wars (MIT Press, 2021)
- Netflix and Streaming Video: The Business of Subscriber-funded Video on Demand (Polity, 2022)
- Media Industries in the Digital Age (with Timothy Havens, Polity, 2024)
- After Mass Media: Storytelling for Microaudiences in the Twenty-First Century (New York University Press, 2025)

=== Editor ===
- Beyond Prime Time: Television Programming in the Post-Network Era (Routledge, 2009)
- Streaming Video: Storytelling Across Borders (co-edited with Ramon Lobato) (New York University Press, 2023)
