= Infotainment =

Media consisting of both information and entertainment

Infotainment, a portmanteau of information and entertainment, is a type of media, usually television or online, that provides a combination of information and entertainment. The term may be used disparagingly to devalue infotainment or soft news subjects in favor of more serious hard news subjects. It is also called soft news as a way to distinguish it from serious journalism or hard news.

== Background ==
The terms "infotainment" and "infotainer" were first used in September 1980 at the Joint Conference of ASLIB, the Institute of Information Scientists, and the Library Association in Sheffield, UK. The Infotainers were a group of British information scientists who put on comedy shows at these professional conferences between 1980 and 1990. In 1983, "infotainment" began to see more popular usage, and the infotainment style gradually began to replace soft news with communications theorists.

An earlier slightly variant term, "infortainment" was the theme of the 1974 convention of the Intercollegiate Broadcasting System, the association of college radio stations in the United States. The event held April 5–7, 1974, at the Statler Hilton Hotel (now the Hotel Pennsylvania), defined the term as the "nexus between Information and Entertainment". Historically, the term infotainment was used to discredit woman journalists who were assigned soft news jobs. Soft news was expected to be consumed only by women, but eventually it became its own genre of news media.

== Infotainment as news ==
Infotainment can generally be identified by its entertaining nature. Infotainment may also involve the use of flashy graphics, fast-paced editing, music, sensationalism, and sometimes satire to catch the viewer/readers' attention. Popular examples of infotainment shows include Larry King Live, Entertainment Tonight, Hannity and Colmes, The Alex Jones Show, The Daily Show, and The Oprah Winfrey Show.

A precise academic consensus on the definition of what constitutes infotainment/soft news as opposed to hard news has not yet been reached. Many authors have commented that the ideas “are often not clearly defined or not defined at all”. Multiple authors have published their ideas of what each type of media involves, but they vary widely. Wilbur Schramm was one of the first to describe a dichotomy between types of news in relation to human consumption. He separated news into a delayed reward class (including news of public affairs, economic matters, social problems, science, education and health), which closely resembles hard news, and an immediate reward class (including news of crime/corruption, accidents and disasters, sports, social events, and human interest) which closely resembles infotainment/soft news.

Some authors use only the topicality and timeliness aspects of a story to determine whether news is hard news or soft news; the more topical and timely, the "harder" and more serious the news is. Other authors have more complex definitions, defining hard news as "breaking events involving top leaders, major issues, or significant disruptions in the routines of daily life," and soft news as "news that typically is more personality-centered, less time-bound, more practical, and more incident-based than other news."

There may be serious reports which are not event-driven—coverage of important social, economic, legal, or technological trends— investigative reports which uncover ongoing corruption, pollution, or immorality—or discussion of unsettled political issues without any special reason. Anniversaries, holidays, the end of a year or season, or the end of the first 100 days of an administration, can make some stories time-sensitive, but these reports provide more of an opportunity for reflection and analysis as opposed to a typical news report on a particular event.

=== "News you can use" ===
The spectrum of "seriousness" and "importance" is not well-defined, and different media organizations make different tradeoffs. "News you can use", a common marketing phrase highlighting a specific genre of journalism, spans the gray area. Tips, advice and hobby-based news fall at the infotainment end of this genre. Warnings about imminent natural disasters or acute domestic security threats are considered more serious, and other media programming (even non-news channels) is usually interrupted to announce these events as breaking news. The importance of "news you can use" on a personal level is rather subjective.

== Criticism ==
Most infotainment television programs on networks and broadcast cable only contain general information on the subjects they cover and may not be considered to have high levels of substantive informational value. For example, an infotainment broadcast may frame accusations of a celebrity or other individual committing a crime as a reality, with no verifiable factual support or evidence of such claims. Some disapprove of infotainment media, especially TV and cable, because it "seem[s] to hurtle from one event to another, often dwelling on trivial, celebrity-driven content."

Today's broadcasting of what is considered "hard" informative news is sometimes diluted with attributes of fiction or drama, and infotainment. Some argue that a catalyst for this may be the acquisition of major news networks by conglomerates primarily based in the entertainment business (e.g. Viacom‐Paramount owned CBS News; ABC News has been part of the Disney corporation since 1996; CNN is a key constituent of Time‐Warner, Fox News is owned by Rupert Murdoch's News Corporation, one of the world's biggest media conglomerates). The ownership structure can be traced using infotainment. For example, there may be an infotainment story on celebrities that are involved in the making of a movie produced by the news channel's parent company.

=== Public critique ===
In October 2010 at the Rally to Restore Sanity and/or Fear, American political satirist Jon Stewart made a metaphorical statement regarding the media today: "The press can hold its magnifying glass up to our problems . . . illuminating issues heretofore unseen, or they can use that magnifying glass to light ants on fire and then perhaps host a week of shows on the sudden, unexpected, dangerous flaming ant epidemic." This statement referred to the news media's ability to focus in on the real problems of people, and transform them into infotainment that is publicized to entertain, possibly exacerbating the issue at the same time.

In a critique of infotainment, Bonnie Anderson of News Flash cited a CNN lead story on February 2, 2004 following the exposure of Janet Jackson's breast on national television. The follow-up story was about a ricin chemical attack on then-U.S. Senate Majority Leader Bill Frist.

== Well-known infotainers ==
Infotainers are entertainers in infotainment media, such as news anchors or satirists who cross the line between journalism (quasi-journalism) and entertainment. Barbara Walters, was for many an iconic infotainer; she pioneered many techniques still used by infotainment media today. Other notable examples from U.S. media include Oprah Winfrey, Jon Stewart, Bill O’Reilly, Rachel Maddow, Alex Jones and Geraldo Rivera.

When Geraldo Rivera became the host of his own news-oriented talk show on CNBC, others within the NBC organization voiced their protest, including Tom Brokaw, who was reported to have threatened to quit. Rivera had a notorious history as a "sleaze reporter" and tabloid talk show host, on which he and others would review controversial and sensationalistic topical subject matter.

== On social media ==
Some digital media platforms use a "triple-product" business model in which infotainment (information and entertainment) is exchanged for attention and user surveillance data, which in turn is monetized for targeted ad revenue.

Infotainment is now able to reach an ever-growing audience through the widespread popularity and use of social media applications. In the case of social media websites such as Twitter and Facebook, which were originally created for the purpose of connecting, re-connecting and sharing personal thoughts and information with public, they have now provided a new medium for the spread of infotainment. The interactive nature of social media has also allowed for the consumers of infotainment to become producers, generating their own news and commentary, some of which is often used by journalists as material for stories.

== Impact ==
The broadcast of important or interesting events was originally meant to inform society of local or international events for their own safety and awareness. However, local news broadcasters are more regularly covering local events in a way that provokes entertainment in viewers, with arresting footage, animated visuals, and rhetorical headlines that generate opinions. The media's ability to tell and sell stories allows them the ability to not only to document tragedy, but to misrepresent or exploit it. As is seen in the news (with stories of extreme obesity or unusual deformities) some forms of infotainment can commodify real people through their personal tragedies or scandals.

== See also ==
- Amusing Ourselves to Death – 1985 book by Neil Postman
- Documentary television – Genre of television program
- Edutainment – Media designed to educate through entertainment
- In-car entertainment – Automotive entertainment system
- Infomercial – Long television commercial
- Junk food news – Sardonic term for trivial news stories
- Least objectionable program
- Politainment – Portmanteau
- Popular science – Science content aimed at an audience of laymen
- Product placement – Marketing technique
- Subliminal stimuli – Sensory stimuli below an individual's threshold for conscious perception
