= Golden Age of Television =

1940s and 1950s in American television

The Night America Trembled was Studio One's September 9, 1957, top-rated television recreation of Orson Welles's radio broadcast of The War of the Worlds on October 30, 1938. Alexander Scourby is seen in the foreground. Warren Beatty (not pictured), in one of his earliest roles, appeared in the bit part of a card-playing college student.

The first Golden Age of Television is an era of television in the United States marked by its large number of live productions. The period is generally recognized as beginning on May 7, 1947 with the first episode of the drama anthology Kraft Television Theatre and ending on May 18, 1960 with the final episode of Playhouse 90, although a few Golden Age shows and stars continued into the 1960s. The Golden Age was followed by the network era, wherein television audiences and programming had shifted to less critically acclaimed fare, almost all of it taped or filmed.

== Limitations of early television ==
Prior to 1928, there had been some attempts at television programming using the mechanical television process. One of the first series made specifically for television to have a sustained run was CBS's 1931–1933 murder-mystery series The Television Ghost, which ran for all 19 months that its flagship television station, then W2XAB, was on the air. The limits of mechanical television inherently meant that these productions were extremely primitive; The Television Ghost, for example, consisted entirely of a 15-minute monologue of a single actor, with the only visual shot being the actor's head.

By the time electronic television matured in the late 1930s, some more varied experimental programs, including live sportscasts and some game shows (such as the CBS Television Quiz and Truth or Consequences), were appearing. In 1942, most television service was suspended because of World War II. The decade-long period of new developments in television technology enabled broadcasting companies to prepare for the end of the war, and the ensuing postwar prosperity allowed for increased consumer purchase of television sets.

Early television broadcasts were limited to live or filmed productions. The first practical videotape system, Ampex's Quadruplex, only became available in 1957. Broadcasting news, sports and other live events was something of a technical challenge in the early days of television and live drama with multiple cameras was extremely challenging. A live, 90-minute drama might require a dozen sets and at least that many cameras. Major set and other changes had to occur during commercials, and there were no "second takes". The performing cast and crew operated with the awareness that as many as 10 million people were viewing their telecast, and any error was seen live.

After the adoption of videotape in 1957, many live dramas were shot "live to tape", still retaining a "live" television look and feel but able to both preserve the program for later broadcast and allowing the possibility of retakes, still rare since videotape editing required a razor blade and was not done unless absolutely necessary.

With the availability of videotape, networks used it more often for daytime programming, such as soap opera dramas. During the 7:30 pm to 11 pm "prime" viewership period, use of filmed (rather than live) programming grew from 1951's 20%, and 1956's 58%, to 1961-62's ca. 80% filmed episodes.

In Britain, from the very beginning of regular television broadcasting in 1936 until the 1980s, interior scenes for television drama and comedy shows were shot with electronic cameras, while exterior scenes were shot with film cameras. This arrangement conditioned British viewers to identify a "live" look with interior scenes and a "film" look with exterior scenes. In the U.S. and West Germany, most shows were produced completely in either film or video to avoid jarring difference in frame rate. Most other countries avoided outdoor shots for television productions as much as they could until portable video cameras became available.

By the early 1960s, about 90% of American households had a television set, and the roles of television and radio had changed significantly. Radio was largely saved from obsolescence by the invention of the far more portable transistor radio in the 1950s and the concurrent rise of higher-fidelity FM radio, so that radio became primarily a medium for music, while scripted programming became wholly the domain of television.

== Evolution of high-culture drama on television ==
The early days of television introduced hour-long anthology drama series, many of which received critical acclaim. Examples include Kraft Television Theatre (debuted May 7, 1947), The Chevrolet Tele-Theatre (debuted September 27, 1948), Television Playhouse (debuted December 4, 1947), The Philco Television Playhouse (debuted October 3, 1948), Westinghouse Studio One (debuted November 7, 1948), and Your Show Time (debuted January 21, 1949).

High culture dominated commercial network television programming in the 1950s with the first television appearances of Leonard Bernstein (on Omnibus) and Arturo Toscanini, the first telecasts from Carnegie Hall, the first live U.S. telecasts of plays by Shakespeare, the first telecasts of Tchaikovsky's ballets The Sleeping Beauty and The Nutcracker, and the first opera specially composed for television, Gian Carlo Menotti's Amahl and the Night Visitors. The Bell Telephone Hour, an NBC radio program, began its television run featuring both classical and Broadway performers. The networks employed art critics, notably Aline Saarinen and Brian O'Doherty, something that was mostly discontinued by the start of the digital television era (CBS's John Leonard being the last of significance).

As a new medium, television introduced many innovative programming concepts, such as the diverse cultural programs of Omnibus that debuted on November 9, 1952, and won 65 awards during its run until April 16, 1961.

Prime time television drama showcased both original and classic productions, including the first telecasts of Walt Disney's programs, as well as the first telecasts of Mary Martin in Peter Pan, MGM's classic The Wizard of Oz and Rodgers and Hammerstein's Cinderella. The first screen adaptation of a James Bond story was a teleplay, "Casino Royale", that aired in 1954. Critics and viewers looked forward to new teleplays by Paddy Chayefsky, Horton Foote, Tad Mosel, Reginald Rose, Rod Serling, William Templeton, Gore Vidal and others. A few of these teleplays, including Rose's Twelve Angry Men and Chayefsky's Marty, would be adapted for film and other media and go on to great acclaim.

Most of these programs were produced as installments of live dramatic anthologies, such as The Philco Television Playhouse, Kraft Television Theatre and Playhouse 90. Live, abridged versions of plays such as Cyrano de Bergerac, with members of the cast of the 1946 Broadway revival recreating their roles, were regularly shown during this period. Playhouse 90 was one of the last shows of its kind; by the late 1950s, production of most American television was moving to Hollywood, which itself carried a contrasting culture and sensibility to shows based in New York City, where most Golden Age programs originated.

The last survivor of the Golden Age's highbrow programming was Camera Three, CBS's "obscure" Sunday morning arts anthology that began nationwide distribution in 1956. It would be carried on CBS until 1979, when CBS News Sunday Morning took over the time slot and included some arts content among its features.

This high culture approach to television could be interpreted as a product of its time as networks were concerned with "cultural uplift" and viewed it as a way to cultural legitimacy on the new medium. A similar uplift occurred in the late 1990s to early 2000s, when the networks were switching to high definition format. This was the time when Discovery Channel commissioned Discovery HD Theater to broadcast HD documentaries about nature and history, while BBC released Planet Earth. This coincided with the rise of the new Golden Age of Television that arose in the twenty-first century.

== American television genres ==
Comedy and variety shows were popular. Comedy stars with their own shows included: Milton Berle, Sid Caesar, Burns and Allen, Jack Benny, Bob Hope, Jackie Gleason, Red Skelton, Abbott and Costello, Martin and Lewis, and Groucho Marx who starred in his quiz show You Bet Your Life. Dinah Shore, Perry Como, Eddie Fisher, Nat King Cole, Dean Martin, Frank Sinatra, and Lawrence Welk as well as other stars had popular weekly musical variety shows. The Ed Sullivan Show showcased many famous acts during the decade.

Professional wrestling was one of the most popular genres of programming in the early days of television, largely because of the popularity of Gorgeous George (George Wagner), who became one of the biggest draws in the industry. As networks looked for inexpensive programming to fill their time slots, wrestling proved popular with viewers and, according to one account, was among the first television programs to turn a profit.[1] George's theatrical, melodramatic persona made him a well-known figure in American popular culture and helped bring wrestling to a national television audience.[2]

His first television appearance took place on November 11, 1947, an event that was named among the top 100 televised acts of the 20th century by Entertainment Weekly. He immediately became a national celebrity at the same level of Lucille Ball and Bob Hope, who personally donated hundreds of chic robes for George's collection, while changing the course of the industry. No longer was pro-wrestling simply about the in-ring action, but Wagner had created a new sense of theatrics and character performance that had not previously existed. In a very real sense, it was Gorgeous George who single-handedly established television as a viable entertainment medium that could potentially reach millions of homes across the country. It is said that George was probably responsible for selling as many television receivers as Milton Berle.

Westerns quickly became a staple of 1950s TV entertainment. The first, on June 24, 1949, was the Hopalong Cassidy show, at first edited from the 66 films made by William Boyd. A great many B-movie Westerns were aired on TV as time fillers, starring actors like: Gene Autry, Roy Rogers, Tex Ritter, John Wayne, Lash LaRue, Buster Crabbe, Bob Steele, Johnny Mack Brown, Hoot Gibson, Ken Maynard and others. A number of long-running TV Western series became classics in their own right.

Notable TV Westerns include: The Gene Autry Show, The Roy Rogers Show, Gunsmoke, The Lone Ranger, The Adventures of Wild Bill Hickok, The Rifleman, Wanted: Dead or Alive, Have Gun – Will Travel, Wyatt Earp, Bat Masterson, Tales of Wells Fargo, The Range Rider, The Cisco Kid, Bonanza, The Virginian, Wagon Train, The Restless Gun, Trackdown, Annie Oakley, The Big Valley, Maverick, The High Chaparral, Sugarfoot, Cheyenne, The Adventures of Kit Carson, Dick Powell's Zane Grey Theatre, Death Valley Days and many others.

The mid-1950s were a period of rapid growth in popularity for the quiz show format until it was beset by a series of scandals, hastening the end of the golden age. Lower-budget game shows and panel shows continued to be popular as daytime fare for several decades after.

Current events, Newscasting and journalism were distinguished by several broadcasting programs by Edward R. Murrow of CBS. Murrow's 1951 See It Now and Person to Person showcased important events, places and people in the news. NBC's Chet Huntley and David Brinkley, and CBS' Walter Cronkite also pioneered important news programming. Cronkite was the first journalist to be described as an "anchor". Other public interest, and historical programming included Omnibus hosted by Alistair Cooke, and You Are There hosted by Walter Cronkite. NBC's Today hosted by Dave Garroway established the modern format of the morning news show.

The late-night talk show began in 1950 with short-lived efforts from Jerry Lester (Broadway Open House) and Faye Emerson; Tonight would prove more enduring under the successive hosting runs of Steve Allen (1954–57), Ernie Kovacs (1956–57) and Jack Paar (1957–62). Other forms of talk shows were not as popular on a national scale during the Golden Age and would not become widespread until into the network era that followed it.

In 1953 CBS anchor Walter Cronkite was the host of the historical news show You Are There, which highlighted important news events from history like the 1776 signing of the Declaration of Independence and which featured "live" interviews with the famous participants like Thomas Jefferson, Benjamin Franklin, John Adams et al., all played by actors.

== Blue-collar sitcoms and rural dramas ==
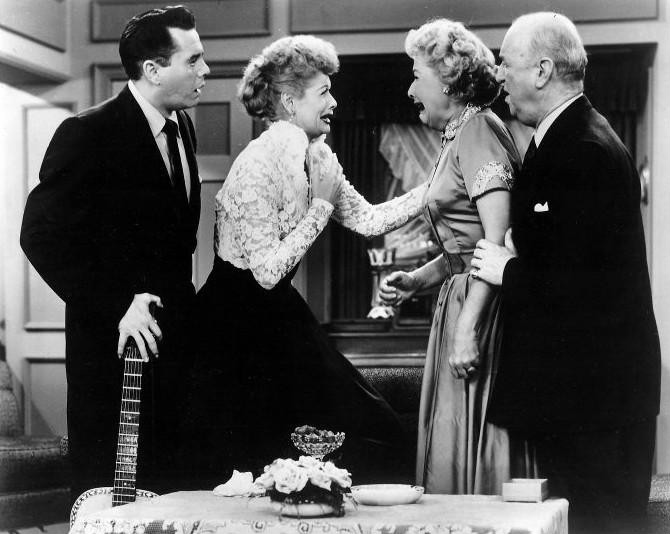
Desi Arnaz, Lucille Ball, Vivian Vance, and William Frawley, from the I Love Lucy episode "Face to Face"

Many lightweight television programs of this era evolved from successful radio shows, which in turn originated from vaudeville stages, many of them in the Borscht Belt within driving distance of New York City. The radio stars, casts, and writing staffs brought existing concepts to television. The New York location also gave television networks access to established Broadway stars. Many of the early stars of television also had extensive film experience, either through short subjects or B-movies, though headline stars rarely made the jump. Lucille Ball, for example, was one of a number of women nicknamed "Queen of the B's" for her film work. This is one reason that quality was so consistently high during this period.

I Love Lucy drew heavily from both film and radio. Many of the show's scripts were rewrites from Lucille Ball's late 1940s radio show My Favorite Husband. Shows such as Gunsmoke and The Jack Benny Program ran concurrently on both radio and television until television reception reached beyond the major metropolitan areas in the mid-1950s. Others, such as Father Knows Best and Fibber McGee and Molly, attempted to "flash-cut" from radio to television, with varying degrees of success.

I Love Lucy, in particular, took extensive steps toward matching the quality of the radio writing with a cinematic look worthy of feature films. To this effect, they established a multi-camera setup, a revolutionary process that became an industry standard in the decades to come, to allow for a live studio audience. They hired cinematographer Karl Freund to oversee filming and recorded the series on movie-quality 35mm film. The relatively high cost prevented the show from being filmed in color as Lucille Ball and Desi Arnaz had originally hoped.

== End of the American golden age ==
By the late 1950s network era, as television began reaching larger portions of rural America, their viewing habits began to be reflected in overall television ratings. Sylvester "Pat" Weaver was fired in 1956 after his strategy of programming highbrow "spectacular" productions once a month on NBC proved to be a ratings failure against more conventional fare on CBS. Rural sitcoms and Westerns boomed, perplexing even the writers of the shows and being treated as an opportunity for callous exploitation by the network executives, who nonetheless hated the programs, as did most critics. Americans' fondness for the rural sitcom and Western formats would last well into the 1960s.

James Aubrey, the president of CBS Network from 1960 to 1965, introduced to television the shows such as Mister Ed, The Dick Van Dyke Show, The Beverly Hillbillies, Petticoat Junction, and Danny Kaye, in addition to already well-established Danny Thomas, Ed Sullivan, What's My Line?, Perry Mason, I Love Lucy, Gunsmoke. Characterized by a former colleague at ABC as having "a smell for the blue-collar", Aubrey later admitted:

We made an effort to continue purposeful drama on TV, but we found out that the people just don't want an anthology. They would rather tune in on Lucy.

The nation as a whole was also tiring of high-culture programming as the Baby Boomers were beginning to come of age; over the next several years, high-culture programs would be relegated to public television, where older audiences with more money were tolerated. By the 1980s, enough highbrow enthusiasts had gradually died, such that public television even began resorting to more popular fare to maintain donations.

A general decline in quality had been noticed as early as 1958, as the Peabody Award committee, in issuing an award to The Steve Allen Show that year, lamented that television was "conspicuously lacking ... genuine humor and frank experiments". As filmed series such as Alfred Hitchcock Presents and The Twilight Zone began to dominate during the mid-1950s to early 1960s, the period of live television dramas was viewed as the Golden Age. The exact boundaries of the Golden Age are somewhat debated; producer David Susskind, in a 1960s roundtable discussion with leading 1950s television dramatists, defined television's Golden Age as 1938 to 1954, while The Television Industry: A Historical Dictionary says "the Golden Age opened with Kraft Television Theatre on May 7, 1947, and ended with the last live show in the Playhouse 90 series in 1957."

Generally, the quiz show scandals of 1958, a writer's strike in March 1960, the final show of Playhouse 90 (which debuted in October 1956) in May 1960, and the departure of leading director John Frankenheimer are regarded as having brought the era to an end. The 1960–61 television season was noted by Time magazine as being the worst season in television up to that point, a sentiment echoed by Newton Minow, the chairman of the Federal Communications Commission, who lambasted the television networks for creating a "vast wasteland" of inferior programming in his speech "Television and the Public Interest".

Dennis James, a Golden Age host who was still on air in the early 1970s hosting game shows that were not always critically acclaimed, noted that as television gained critical mass, it had acquired viewers uninterested in high culture and the networks were adjusting to maximize their viewership. Defending his upcoming series The New Price Is Right in 1972, he remarked:

The critics will always look down their noses, but you can't have The Bell Telephone Hour on and still stay in competition. They can sit around and talk about the great wasteland and everything else. If you want to read books, read books.

In November 1960, Weaver commented on the end of the Golden Age of Television in The Denver Post, saying: "Television has gone from about a dozen forms to just two – news shows and the Hollywood stories. The blame lies in the management of NBC, CBS and ABC. Management doesn't give the people what they deserve. I don't see any hope in the system as it is."

In the mid-late 1960s, the quality of television in the United States began to recover, with more experimental shows such as The Monkees and He & She, even as gimmick-driven sitcoms continued to dominate for a few years after until the rural purge of the early 1970s.

== Worldwide ==
=== Canada ===
Canada's Golden Age of Television timeline is very similar to that of the U.S. (in fact, most Canadians were within the broadcast range of at least one American television station by the 1950s), but there is an overall five-year delay because of the country's sparser population. CBC Television, the country's official national broadcast organization, launched in 1952, and CTV Television Network, the oldest commercial network in the country, followed in 1962. Although there were a handful of efforts to produce domestic content for the Canadian networks, most Golden Age shows were imported from the United States until the Can-Con requirements took effect around 1970.

Actor Lorne Greene, then a news anchor for the CBC, operated a prestigious training academy across from the CBC studios from 1945 to 1952, which developed much of Canada's early homegrown television talent. The school was never profitable, but Greene was unwilling to increase enrollment to levels that would make it sustainable and accommodate overwhelming demand for the academy's courses, because Greene feared it would compromise the academy's standards.

The 1956 CBC teleplay Flight into Danger launched the career of author Arthur Hailey, who would later write Airport. Both of Hailey's stories would be adapted to film (Zero Hour! and the Airport film series respectively) and would be spoofed in the movie Airplane!.

=== Nigeria ===
Nigeria has the earliest television industry on the African continent and one of the earliest in the world. The Western Nigeria Television Service (WNTV), Nigeria's and Africa's first television station, began operation in the then Western Region in October 1959. The other two regions of the country soon followed suit; with the establishment of the Eastern Nigeria Television Service (ENTV) in Enugu, in 1960, and the Radio Television Kaduna (RKTV) in Kaduna, in March 1962. Also in 1962, The Federal Government established a fourth station, the Nigerian Television Service, in the then capital, Lagos. The numbers grew rapidly and in the mid-1980s, every Nigerian state had its own broadcasting station.

Laws were made by regulating bodies to limit foreign contents on television, with the National Commission recommending a minimum of 60 percent local programming content for all broadcasting stations. This led television producers to begin the broadcast of local popular theatre productions. Chinua Achebe's novel Things Fall Apart was adapted as a television series on National Television in 1987 and became very successful.

At this time, Another very successful television adaptation was the adaptation of D.O. Fagunwa's 1949 novel Igbó Olódùmarè. The television series, which is of the same title witnessed a tremendous success, especially in South western states, where it was reported that the show constantly left streets deserted during its broadcast on Sunday evenings. Other television successes in the 1980s include series such as Adio Family, The Village Headmaster, Cock's Crow at Dawn, The Masquerade, Mirror in the Sun, Checkmate, Sura The Tailor, Second Chance and Awada Kerikeri. Hausa comedy soap operas such as Karkuzu and Karambana were also quite popular in this period.

=== South Africa ===
South Africa was one of the last nations in the world to have television; the apartheid government resisted television broadcasting until the mid-1970s, with experimental broadcasts only beginning in 1975 and nationwide service starting in January 1976.

=== United Kingdom ===
British television, like its American subordinate, began developing in the 1930s, with the BBC Television Service beginning regular broadcasts in 1936. The early British television drama borrowed a great deal from dramatic radio productions developed between the First and the Second World Wars. In the 1920s, the BBC pioneered dramatic readings of books. In 1925, it broadcast A Christmas Carol. Later, John Reith, wanting to use radio waves to "part the clouds of ignorance", came up with the idea of a classic serial, based on a "classical" literary text.

In 1939, the BBC adapted the romantic novel The Prisoner of Zenda for radio broadcast. Its adapter, Jack Inglis, summarised his approach as follows: "The story is simple, with clear cut characters, and falls easily into episodes. It always seems to me, that it is the first duty of an adapter to reproduce in another medium the original flavour and atmosphere of the book". Inglis compressed several characters into one and simplified the plotline. The production struck a chord with listeners and served as a prototype for dramatic productions that followed it.

BBC television broadcasts ceased in 1939, as did the production of television receivers, resuming in 1946 after World War II. The golden age of British television has been used to describe the period until the mid-1970s.

=== Soviet Union / Russia ===
The "Golden Age" of the Soviet media culture is usually associated with Khrushchev Thaw, which spanned from the mid-1950s until the end of 1960s. The live nature of television and relatively young age of the people involved in its development afforded certain level of exuberance, edginess, debate and criticism.

Like in the United States, this period is notable for many television plays broadcast on Soviet television. For example, in 1951–1954 the Central Television Studio broadcast three to six plays a week. As time went on, the quantity and quality of the theatrical television productions diminished. The reasons were technical, social, and economic. Staging a new production in a television studio every other day was expensive. The shortage of mobile cameras often precluded broadcasting live performance from a theater.

Theaters became increasingly reluctant to offer their shows to television, claiming that television draws the public away from theaters. Some theatrical directors prohibited actors to participate in television shows. Theaters started demanding payment for broadcasting of their plays, and by the end of 1960s the frequency of theatrical shows fell to one show a week. Because the State Committee for Cinematography would hold freshly released movies from television broadcast, television studios started producing their own made-for-TV movies

The Thaw ended with the crackdown of the Prague Spring. The Soviet government deemed Czechoslovak mass media, which hosted political disputes and broadcast news about protesting students and young workers, to be complicit in undermining Communist rule in Czechoslovakia. Sergey Lapin, installed as the chairman of the State Committee for Television and Radio Broadcasting in 1970, increased political oversight over television and banned shows that were critical of the system. Most programs except for the evening news were recorded beforehand and censored. This effectively ended the first "Golden Age" of the Soviet television.

The second "Golden Age" of television in Russia is associated with perestroika and glasnost of the late 1980s and with creation of private television companies in the 1990s. This period is notable for edgy talk shows and comedic productions that targeted youth, such as Outlook, Till 16 and older, 12th Floor, Before and After Midnight, Oba-na. Political and economic news, live broadcasts from state Duma, critique of the government became standard fare of 1990s.

In 2000s the Russian government increased its control over independent television companies, and applied political and economic pressure to discourage them from criticizing the government and its policies. In 2001 Gazprom took ownership of the private television company NTV, which aired several gritty programs. The satirical show Puppets, which mocked major politicians and celebrities, was terminated in 2002 after pressure from the Kremlin. In January 2002 another independent television company TV-6 was terminated.

In 2014, TV Rain was heavily criticized for asking viewers whether Leningrad should have been surrendered to the invading Nazi army in order to save hundreds of thousands of lives, since Hitler did not offer surrender as an option, only death. After that, the largest Russian television providers stopped carrying the channel. Ultimately, left without money from broadcasters and advertisers, TV Rain was forced to move its studio to a private apartment. Contemporary independent television broadcasters stick mostly to unoffensive soap operas and talk shows, leaving the political programming to government-owned channels. In March 2022, Russian authorities blocked access to TV Rain in response to its coverage of the 2022 Russian invasion of Ukraine. The channel relaunched from studios in Latvia in July, but after multiple violations had its license cancelled in December. TV Rain continues to broadcast via YouTube and received a Netherlands broadcast license in January 2023.

== List of selected shows ==
- I Love Lucy
- Dragnet
- Howdy Doody
- Captain Kangaroo
- Kukla, Fran and Ollie
- Leave It to Beaver
- The Jack Benny Show
- Lassie
- Playhouse 90
- Kraft Television Theatre
- The Phil Silvers Show
- The Andy Griffith Show
- The Twilight Zone
- The Honeymooners
- Rocky and His Friends and The Bullwinkle Show
- The Flintstones
- Crusader Rabbit
- Adventures of Superman
- The Huckleberry Hound Show
- The Adventures of Ozzie and Harriet
- Father Knows Best
- The Lone Ranger
- The Roy Rogers Show
- The Mickey Mouse Club
- Bozo the Clown
- Walt Disney Presents

== List of selected notable artists ==
- Abby Mann (1927–2008)
- Ed Sullivan (1901–1974)
- Milton Berle (1908–2002)
- Lucille Ball (1911–1989)
- Fred Coe (1914–1979)
- Barbara Billingsley (1915–2010)
- Jackie Gleason (1916–1987)
- Desi Arnaz (1917–1986)
- Art Carney (1918–2003)
- Jack Paar (1918–2004)
- Ernie Kovacs (1919–1962)
- Betty White (1922–2021)
- Arthur Penn (1922–2010)
- Shari Lewis (1933–1998)
- Jim Henson (1936–1990)
- Soupy Sales (1926–2009)
- Audrey Meadows (1922–1996)
- June Foray (1917–2017)
- Bill Scott (1920–1985)
- Jay Ward (1920–1989)
- Paul Winchell (1922–2005)
- William Hanna (1910–2001) and Joseph Barbera (1911–2006)
- Gore Vidal (1925–2012)
- Paddy Chayefsky (1923–1981)
- Sidney Lumet (1924–2011)
- Rod Serling (1924–1975)
- Don Knotts (1924–2006)
- Paul Newman (1925–2008)
- Andy Griffith (1926–2012)
- John Frankenheimer (1930–2002)
- William Shatner (1931–)
- George Reeves (1914–1959)

== See also ==
- History of television
- 1940s in television
- 1950s in television
- 1960s in television
- Least objectionable program
- Golden age of American animation
- Golden Age of Hollywood
- Golden Age of Radio
- New Hollywood
- Television and the Public Interest
- High culture
- Low culture
