= List of shows from the network era =

Television of the network era:

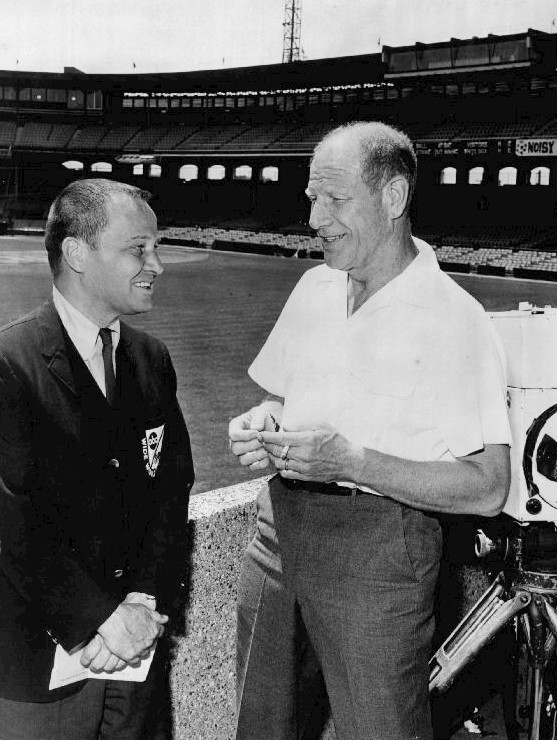
Wide World of Sports, an ABC program.

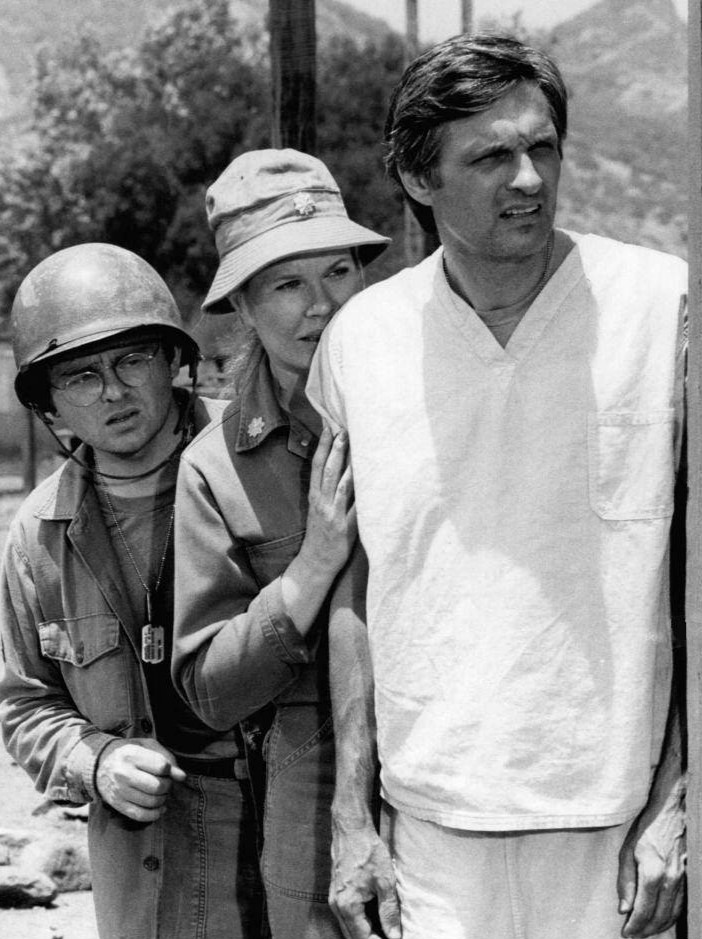
M*A*S*H, a CBS program.

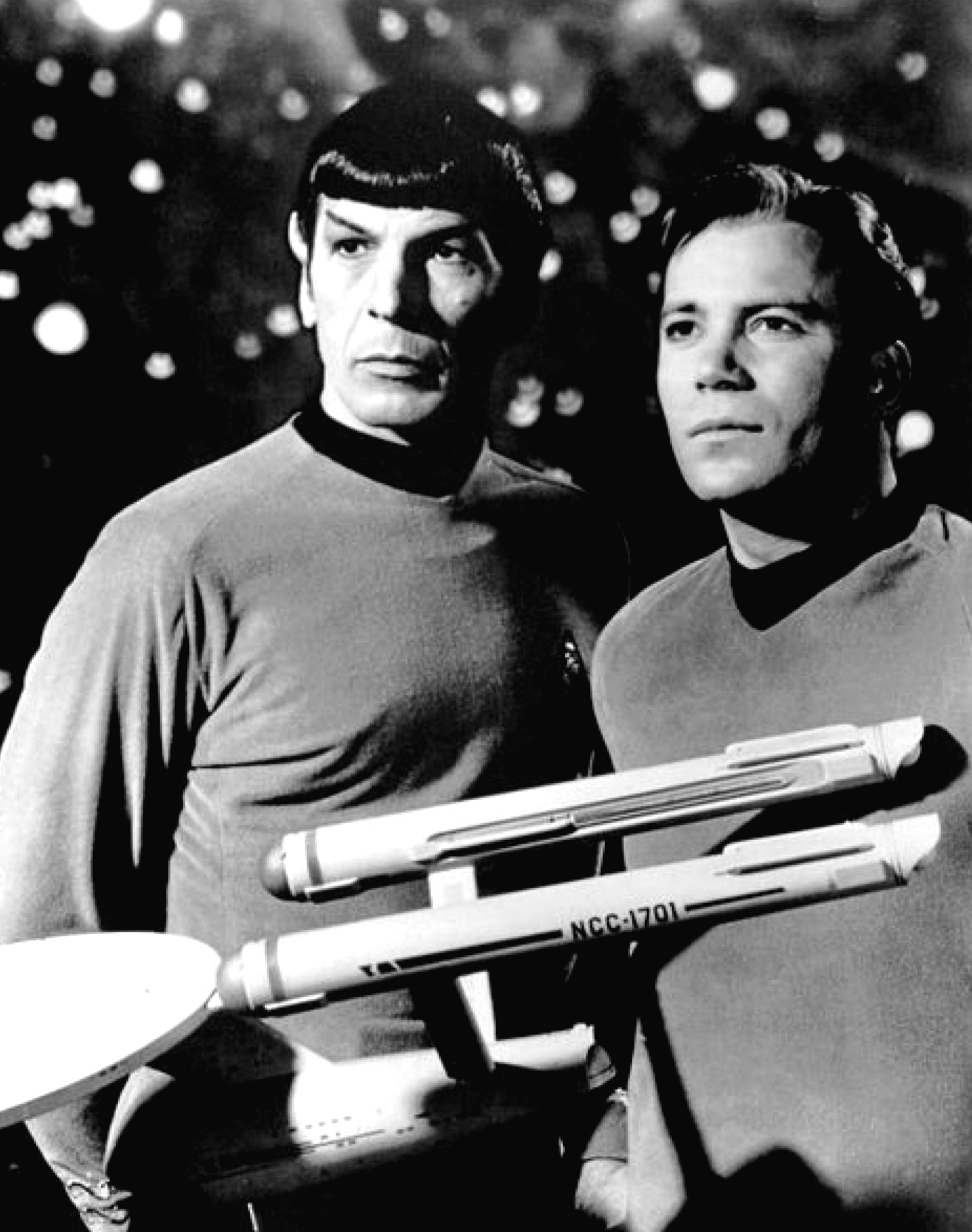
Star Trek, an NBC program.

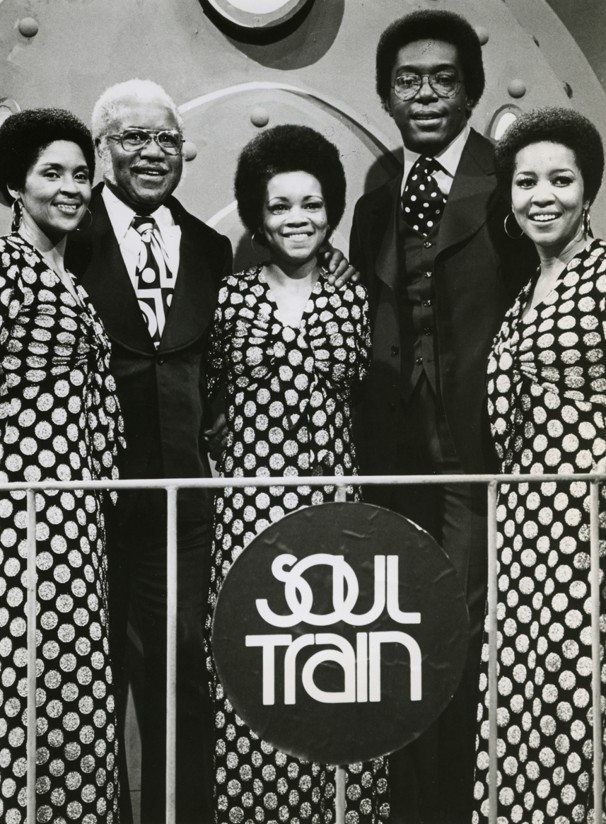
Soul Train, a syndicated program.

The following article consist of shows/programs that aired during the network era of American television from the early 1950s to the mid-late 1980s.

== 1950s ==
- Dennis the Menace
- The Ed Sullivan Show
- I Love Lucy
- The Lawrence Welk Show

== 1960s ==
- Batman
- The Beverly Hillbillies
- Bewitched
- The Brady Bunch
- A Charlie Brown Christmas
- Dark Shadows
- The Fugitive
- General Hospital
- Green Acres
- The Green Hornet
- Hee Haw
- Hulabaloo
- I Dream of Jeannie
- Julia
- The Patty Duke Show
- Shindig!
- Star Trek
- The Tonight Show with Johnny Carson
- Wide World of Sports

== 1970s ==
- All in the Family
- The Autobiography of Miss Jane Pittman
- The Bob Newhart Show
- Brian's Song
- The Carol Burnett Show
- Charlie's Angels
- Columbo
- Dallas
- Duel
- Fantasy Island
- Go Ask Alice
- Happy Days
- The Jeffersons
- Jesus of Nazareth
- Laverne and Shirley
- The Love Boat
- The Mary Tyler Moore Show
- M*A*S*H
- McCloud
- The Midnight Special
- Monday Night Football
- Mork and Mindy
- Pink Lady and Jeff
- The Rockfield Files
- Roots
- Saturday Night Live
- The Six Million Dollar Man
- Someone's Watching Me!
- Soul Train
- The Spell
- Starsky and Hutch
- Three's Company

== 1980s ==
- ALF
- Cagney & Lacey
- Cheers
- The Cosby Show
- The Day After
- An Early Frost
- The Highwayman
- Knight Rider
- L.A. Law
- Hill Street Blues
- Late Night with David Letterman
- Manimal
- Moonlighting
- Special Bulletin
- St. Elsewhere
- thirtysomething
- Wheel of Fortune
- The Wonder Years
