= Golden Age of Television (2000s–2023) =

Period in American television history

In the United States, there have been periods of time described as having such a number of high quality (or "prestige"), internationally acclaimed television programs, that they can be regarded as the Golden Age of Television. One such period stretched roughly from 2000 to 2023, with a subset of this era also known as Peak TV or the Prestige TV era.

Named in reference to the original Golden Age of Television of the 1950s, more recent periods have also been referred to as the "New", "Second", or "Third Golden Age of Television". The various names reflect disagreement over whether shows of the 1980s and early-mid 1990s belong to a since-concluded golden era or to the current one. The contemporary period is generally identified as beginning in 1999 with The Sopranos, with debate as to whether the age ended (or "peaked") in the mid-late 2010s or early 2020s (to the point of calling its replacement "Trough TV"), or remains ongoing. Multichannel linear television, such as cable and digital satellite, reached its peak in 2014 and has declined in viewers, reach and new content rapidly since then; overall new series creation peaked in the early 2020s, following a years-long competitive period known as the streaming wars, cresting shortly before the 2023 Hollywood labor disputes.

The recent "Golden Age" is believed to have resulted from advances in media distribution technology, digital TV technology (including HDTV, online video platforms, TV streaming, video-on-demand, and web TV), and a large increase in the number of hours of available television, which has prompted a major wave of content creation.

== History ==
=== Origins and early era ===
French scholar Alexis Pichard has argued that television enjoyed a Second Golden Age starting in the 2000s which was a combination of three elements: first, an improvement in both visual aesthetics and storytelling; second, an overall homogeneity between cable series and networks series; and third, a tremendous popular success. Pichard contends that this Second Golden Age was the result of a revolution initiated by the traditional networks in the 1980s and carried on by the cable channels (especially HBO) in the 1990s. Film director Francis Ford Coppola thinks that the second golden age of television comes from "kids" with their "little father's camcorder", who wanted to make films like he did in the 1970s but were not permitted to, so they did it for television.

The new Golden Age arose after a short-lived "dark age" that had emerged in the late 1990s in which "low culture took over the world" with increasingly vulgar content, including tabloid talk shows and comedies such as South Park. This broad category also included some of the earliest Golden Age shows, which broke down previous boundaries that had prohibited vulgar content, but did so in more tasteful ways.

The new Golden Age brought creator-driven tragic anti-heroic dramas of the 2000s and 2010s, including:

- 1999's The Sopranos (named the greatest TV show of all time by TV Guide and Rolling Stone) and The West Wing
- 2001's Six Feet Under and 24
- 2002's The Wire (voted as the greatest TV show of the 21st Century by BBC in 2021) and The Shield
- 2004's Deadwood, House, M.D., Lost and Battlestar Galactica
- 2006's Friday Night Lights and Dexter
- 2007's Mad Men
- 2008's Breaking Bad
- 2010's The Walking Dead
- 2011's Homeland and Game of Thrones
- 2013's House of Cards and Orange Is the New Black
- 2014's True Detective
- 2015's Better Call Saul
- 2016's The Crown
- 2018's Succession

Others appear in the Writers Guild of America 2013 vote for 101 Best-Written TV Shows. Production values got higher than ever before on shows such as Band of Brothers, Mad Men, Breaking Bad, and Homeland to the point of rivaling cinema, while anti-heroic series like The Sopranos and The Wire were cited as improving television content thus earning critical praise.

Stephanie Zacharek of The Village Voice has argued that the current golden age began earlier with over-the-air broadcast shows like Babylon 5, Star Trek: Deep Space Nine (both of which premiered in 1993), and Buffy the Vampire Slayer (1997). TV critic Alan Sepinwall cites shows such as Buffy and Oz (which both first aired in 1997) as ushering in the golden age. Will Gompertz of the BBC believes that Friends, which debuted in 1994, might stake a claim as the opening bookend show of the period. Matt Zoller Seitz argues that it began in the 1980s with Hill Street Blues (1981) and St. Elsewhere (1982). Kirk Hamilton of Kotaku has said that Avatar: The Last Airbender (2005) should be considered a part of the golden age of television, and recommended "the sophisticated kids show" to others. Mike Sholars of the Huffington Post agreed, dubbing it the start of a "golden age of animation television." With the rise of instant access to content on Netflix, creator-driven television shows like Breaking Bad, The Shield (2002), Friday Night Lights (2006) and Mad Men gained loyal followings that grew to become widely popular. The success of instant access to television shows was presaged by the popularity of DVDs, and continues to increase with the rise of digital platforms and online companies.

The Golden Age of television is believed to have resulted from advances in media distribution technology, digital TV technology (including HDTV, online video platforms, TV streaming, video-on-demand, and web TV), and a large increase in the number of hours of available television, which has prompted a major wave of content creation. The increase in the number of shows is also cited as evidence of a Golden Age, or "peak TV". In the five years between 2011 and 2016, the number of scripted television shows, on broadcast, cable and digital platforms increased by 71%. In 2002, 182 television shows aired, while 2016 had 455 original scripted television shows and 495 in 2018. The number of shows are rising largely due to companies like Netflix, Amazon Video and Hulu investing heavily in original content. The number of shows aired by online service increased from only one in 2009 to over 93 in 2016.

=== Late era and end ===
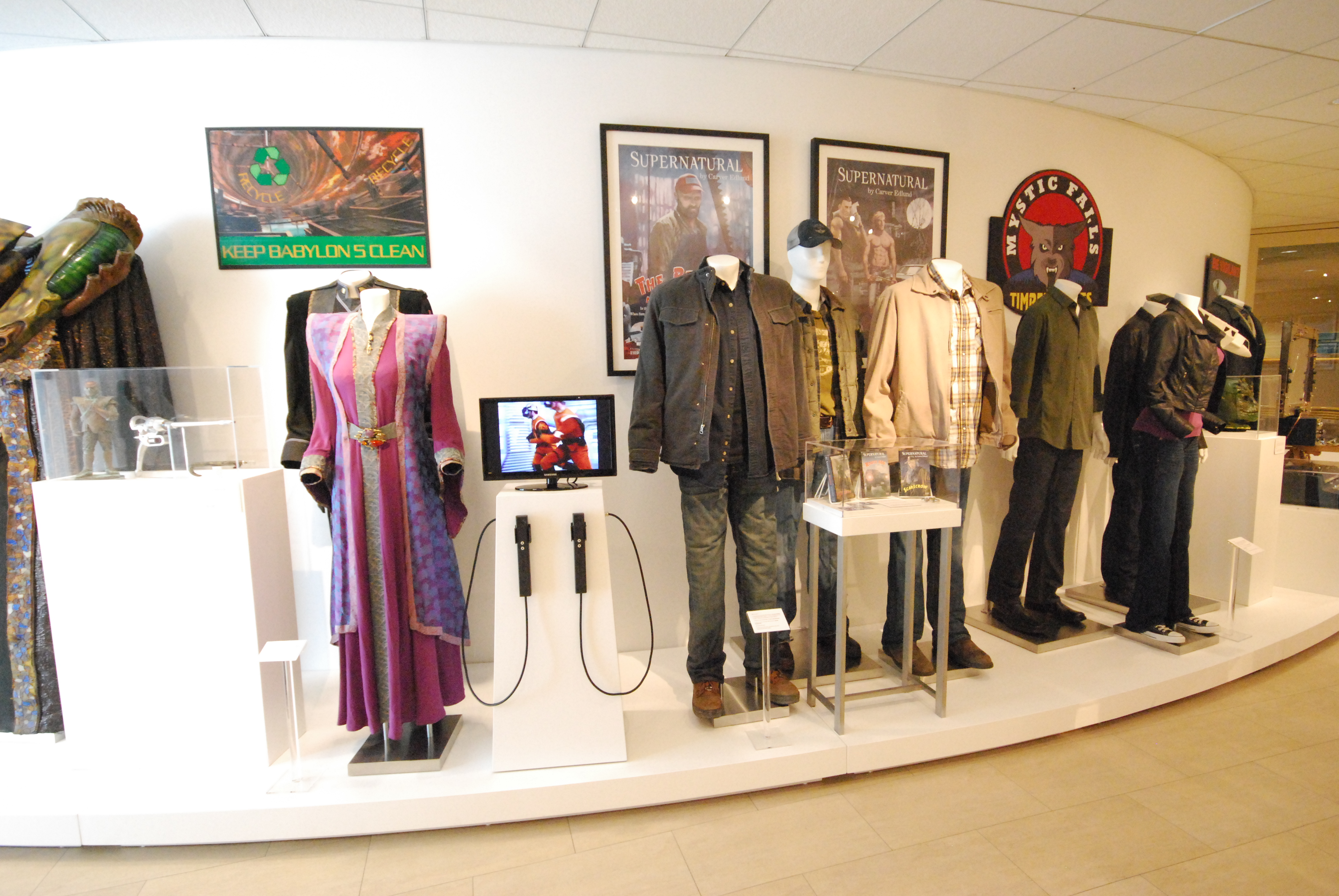
Costumes from Babylon 5, Supernatural, and The Vampire Diaries

An increasing reliance on rebooting and reviving existing franchises led to widespread belief that the Golden Age of Television was ending in the late 2010s, with the caveat that some of these reboots (such as DuckTales, Girl Meets World, One Day at a Time, X-Men '97, and Shōgun) share the positive reception and mature character development of original shows of the era.

To address burnout from binge watching and concerns that the practice of releasing full seasons at once makes television more disposable and forgettable, streaming providers returned to a more traditional model of releasing a new episode per week in the early 2020s. A showrunner for an unnamed series on Netflix, a platform that has been especially aggressive toward releasing full seasons at once as a company policy, commented that the volume of existing content has made devoting the time to binge watching more difficult. By 2024, Netflix had also begun splitting its seasons of new content to limit binge-watching, fearing that it was contributing to a phenomenon where viewers would subscribe for a short period to binge-watch their favorite show only to cancel their subscription when finished. The conclusion of its tentpole series Stranger Things in 2025 marked the "end of an era" for Netflix, as one-season limited-run series and foreign imports had by then constituted the bulk of its original content.

==== Quantity over quality ====
In the Watchmen writers' room, we would play this game called Is It a Show? Somebody would name a title, logline, and one of the actors, and we'd have to guess whether it was real. But the joke was it was always a show. Some were in their second or third seasons, and none of us—supposedly television professionals—had ever heard of them.

— Lost creator Damon Lindelof

Ed Power of the Irish Examiner opined that "the sun began to set" on the golden age between 2013 and 2015, with the finales of Breaking Bad and Mad Men, and "Since then, television has reverted to its older tradition of quantity over quality." Siobhan Lyons of The Conversation believes the 2022 finale of Better Call Saul marks the end of "the last of those defining, golden age shows," in a time increasingly oversaturated with streaming content and viewing options. NPR noted in May 2022 that although television executives had predicted a peak in television series since the mid-2010s, the number of series continued to grow into the early 2020s, from 400 original productions across broadcast, cable and major streaming outlets in 2015 to 559 in 2021. The network noted that the major streamers, with the exception of Disney+ (which NPR attributed to the company's strong brand recognition), were seeing diminishing quality and, particularly in the case of Netflix, declining popularity. A May 2023 essay in Harper's Bazaar declared the era of the time to be the "Age of Mid Television," noting that mediocre programs were gaining popularity due to the escapism they provide in an age where the real world brings greater anxiety. Vulture expressed similar views in June 2023, speaking of Peak TV in the past tense and noting that the more artistic shows that marked the Golden Age of highbrow programming were also expensive and made small or no profits, even if they drew new subscribers. The New Yorker concurred in November of the same year, declaring the Golden Age to be over after a regression toward the mean; based upon several books on the topic, the article essentially argued that the same dynamics that drove the death of earlier Golden Ages in media (such as television's first Golden Age and the New Hollywood of the early 1970s) were also affecting the early 21st-century Golden Age of Television, namely that the technology innovations that had allowed highbrow programs to flourish were being capitalized upon by more profitable franchise products able to crowd out riskier projects for attention from financial backers. Catharine Shoard of The Guardian noted in October 2026 that a string of expensive flops had largely ended the practice of streaming services (along with traditional media companies) granting "blank cheques" to prestigious directors to produce risky vanity projects.

==== Streaming wars and aftermath ====
Around 2019, a period of intense competition began for market share among streaming services, a period known as the streaming wars. This competition increased during the first two years of the COVID-19 pandemic as more people stayed home and watched television. Many services attempted to compete on quality. The streaming wars, combined with the decline of the popularity of mainstream films (along with said films increasingly relying on franchises that are less likely to garner awards), and the rise of independent films winning major film awards within the last six years, resulted in a historical first—the first film from a streaming service to win the Academy Award for Best Picture: Apple TV's CODA.

The streaming wars were largely recognized to have ended in 2022, as the major streaming services lost subscribers and shifted their focus to profit over market share by raising subscription fees, cutting production budgets, cracking down on password sharing, and introducing ad-supported tiers. HBO Max made a substantial cut to its library in August 2022, mostly to its children's television series, out of concerns that the quantity of content on the service (especially with its pending merger with Discovery+) was becoming overwhelming and difficult to find, and that the children's programming was not driving subscriptions or views on the service. By the summer of 2023, other major streaming providers had begun to remove short-lived series from their catalogues and make them unavailable afterwards, something that had previously been a rare occurrence; this was particularly true of Disney+ (Disney had historically followed a similar model with physical media, known as the Disney Vault, which it had initially suspended in the early months of Disney+) and Paramount+. This also coincided with an increased emphasis on business models that draw revenue from both advertising and subscriptions, prompting streaming providers to focus on productions that have mass appeal while also reducing investment in high-risk projects targeting niche audiences.

The COVID-19 pandemic and its aftermath saw major reductions in the workforce and cancellations of multiple productions to save money on basic residuals and music licensing costs, which led to a worsening condition for writers and actors, setting the stage for the 2023 Hollywood labor disputes. This led to fewer shows ordered by studios and streamers as the WGA strike ended and fewer spec scripts being offered by writers to the studios, anticipating the cutbacks. In a January 2024 story titled "Peak TV Is Over", The Hollywood Reporter said that the number of ordered television series' seasons in the United States decreased from 633 in 2022 and 2021 to 481 in 2023, and that the number was not likely to increase in 2024.

==== Rerun boom and the fall of cable ====
That audiences clearly prefer the films of the past has been an inconvenient fact for the streamers who tout themselves as the future of entertainment.

— Will Tavlin, "Casual Viewing", n+1, 2025

Viewership patterns during the pandemic shifted rapidly toward reruns, a trend that continued into 2023 as the streaming providers shifted away from original content and became open to nonexclusive licensing deals allowing popular archive shows to appear on multiple platforms. A 2026 report noted that "Overwhelmingly [...] people in the U.S. are streaming library content (older, preexisting and licensed shows and movies) over original programming." A 2021 interview of social media influencers noted that the teen sitcoms and teen dramas from the early Golden Age, driven by continued presence in reruns and video-on-demand platforms, have stronger followings among Generation Z than contemporary shows; they feel that the latter are more geared toward pre-teens or adults instead of teenagers, try too hard to appeal to current trends, and lack a sense of familiarity compared to shows that have been around since they were born. This is attributed as a cause for the increasing number of reboots and revivals of shows from early in the era. Suits was the most-streamed TV show of 2023, and especially popular with Gen Z, despite new episodes ending in 2019 and being neither, Slate wrote, "a cult classic or a critical darling". The magazine stated that the show and similar "glossy, lightweight procedurals" were ideal second screen content:

They're just about extremely attractive people doing their jobs exceptionally well, then blowing off steam by having extremely attractive sex. In other words, they're what, for the vast majority of the medium's life span, was known simply as "TV."

Even as the pandemic waned, cable television in particular—which suffered a 30% decline in viewer reach between its peak and 2023—increasingly relied upon reruns and other archival programming. Compared to a peak of 214 original cable series in 2014, The New York Times noted that number had fallen 39% by 2022, and further in 2023. The Times dubbed this phenomenon "zombie TV," in that the channels retained a shell of an established cable brand, but without any of the original programming that had defined the channel's identity, as an undead zombie continues to function but without the soul or personality of its host body. The Times also commented that general-interest cable networks such as TNT, USA Network and TBS were particularly hard-hit, with TNT and TBS's combined original series output dropping from 17 series to 3. USA suffered a near-complete loss of its original scripted programming, though this was also partially due to the network absorbing more sports programming from the temporary closure of sister network NBCSN, which helped keep USA's ratings among the highest on cable. Such cable networks have increasingly relied upon all-day marathons of acquired rerun programming to fill their schedules. This has coincided with an even more dramatic decline in viewership, with general-interest cable networks and several of the more established niche networks losing over half of their viewing audiences in the same period; David Bauder of the Associated Press noted that the corresponding declines in viewership and original programming were triggering a vicious cycle, and that by the mid-2020s, cable television had lost its ability to create "appointment television" events, instead relying on "ghost" programming such as low-quality, low-cost reality fare and reruns. By 2024, only three cable series –Yellowstone, Hallmark Channel's original series When Calls the Heart and The Way Home — averaged more than 1.5 million viewers.

The streaming wars were also a factor in a shift toward free advertising supported television initiatives (FAST) in the early 2020s. FAST services typically rely on archival programming for the majority of their content, allowing the services to operate for free to the end user while splitting advertising revenue with the program owners (or profiting directly if the program and FAST service are owned by the same company). Tubi, the advertising-supported video on demand service owned by Fox Corporation, acquired the streaming rights to much of the content that HBO Max had jettisoned in 2023. Pluto TV relies on the extensive archival libraries of Paramount and its numerous acquisitions.

== Characteristics ==
Cultural references to "Peak TV" programming:

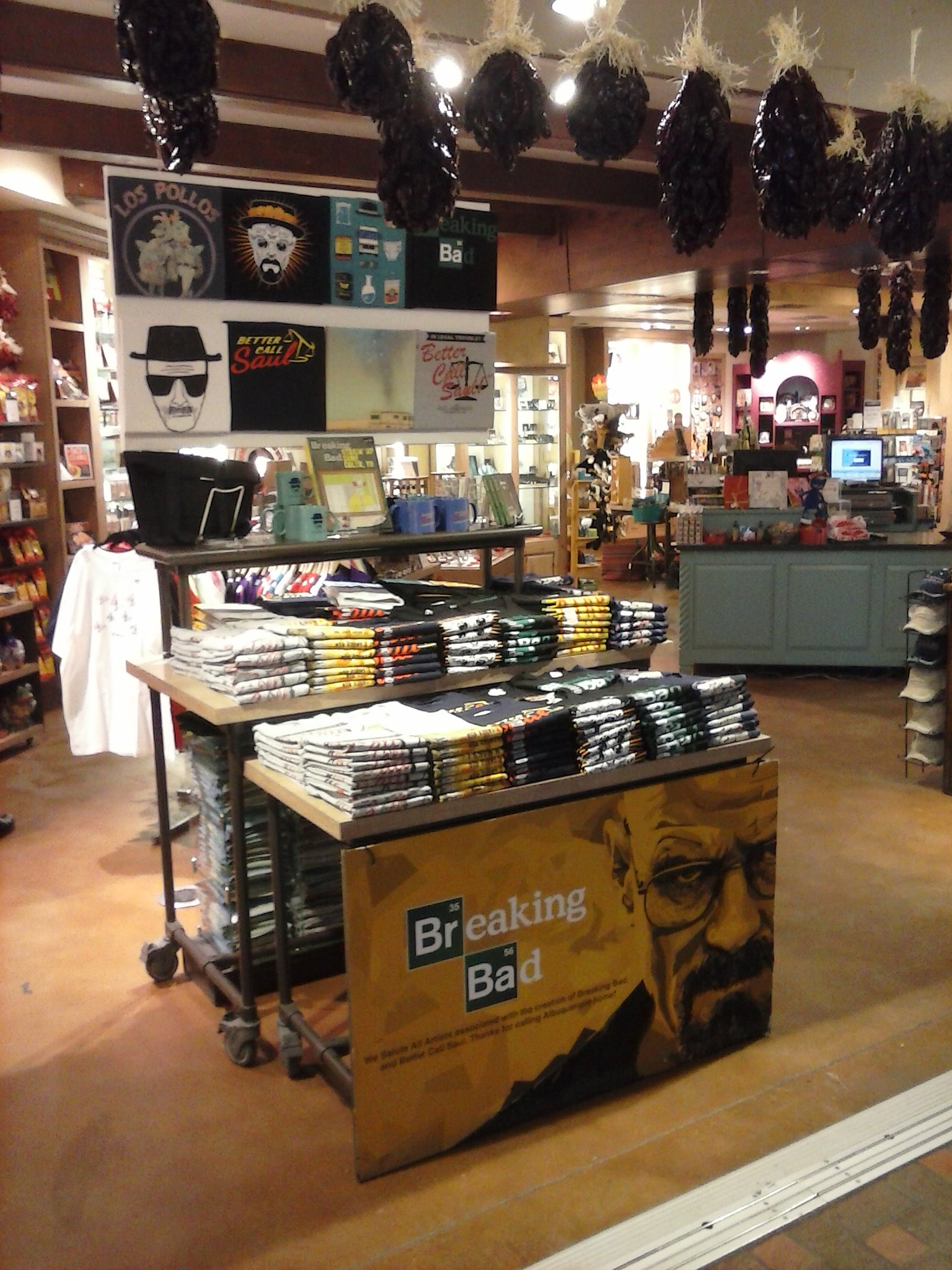
Breaking Bad merchandise inside the Albuquerque International Sunport

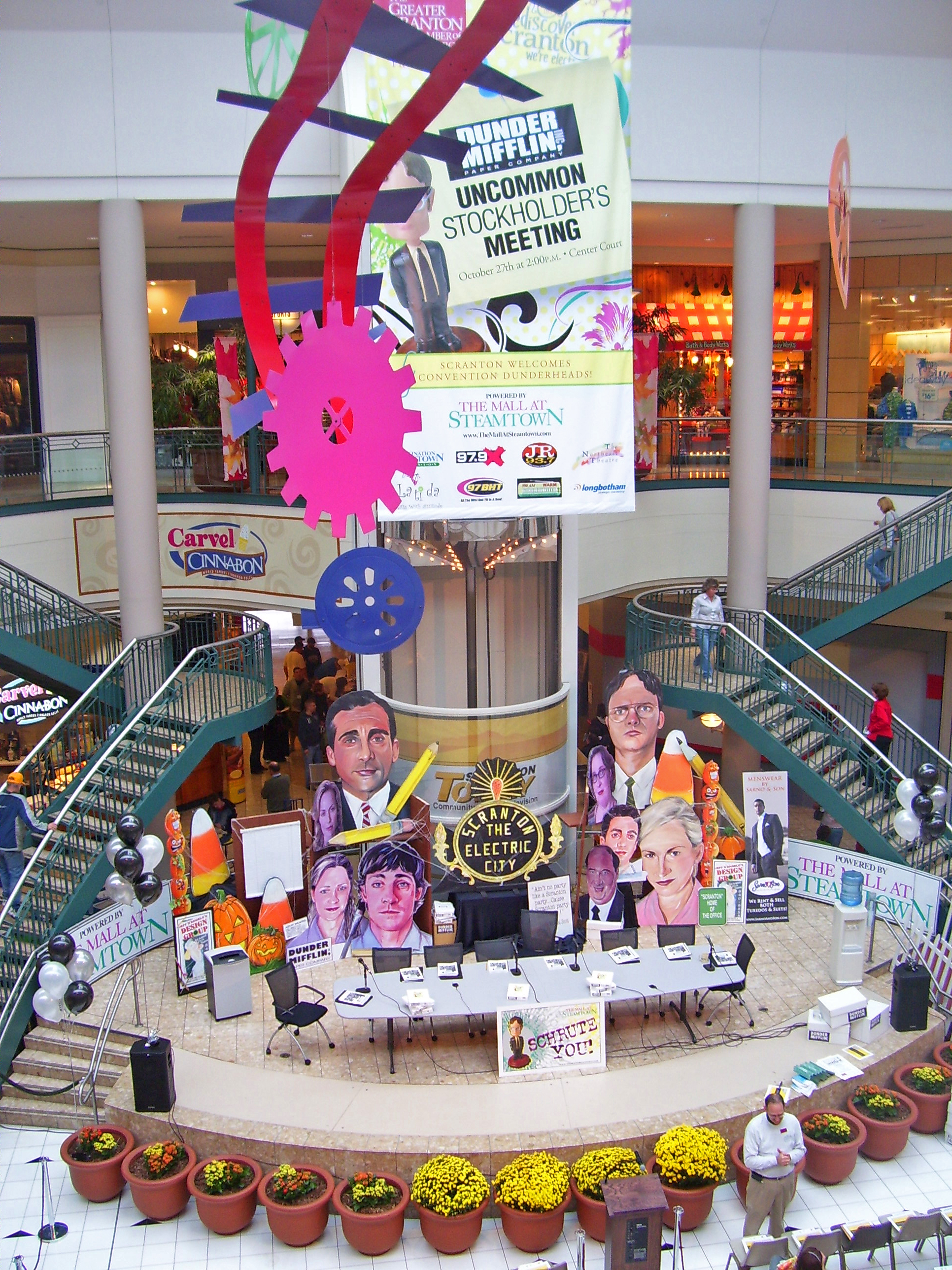
The Office promotional display in Scranton, Pennsylvania

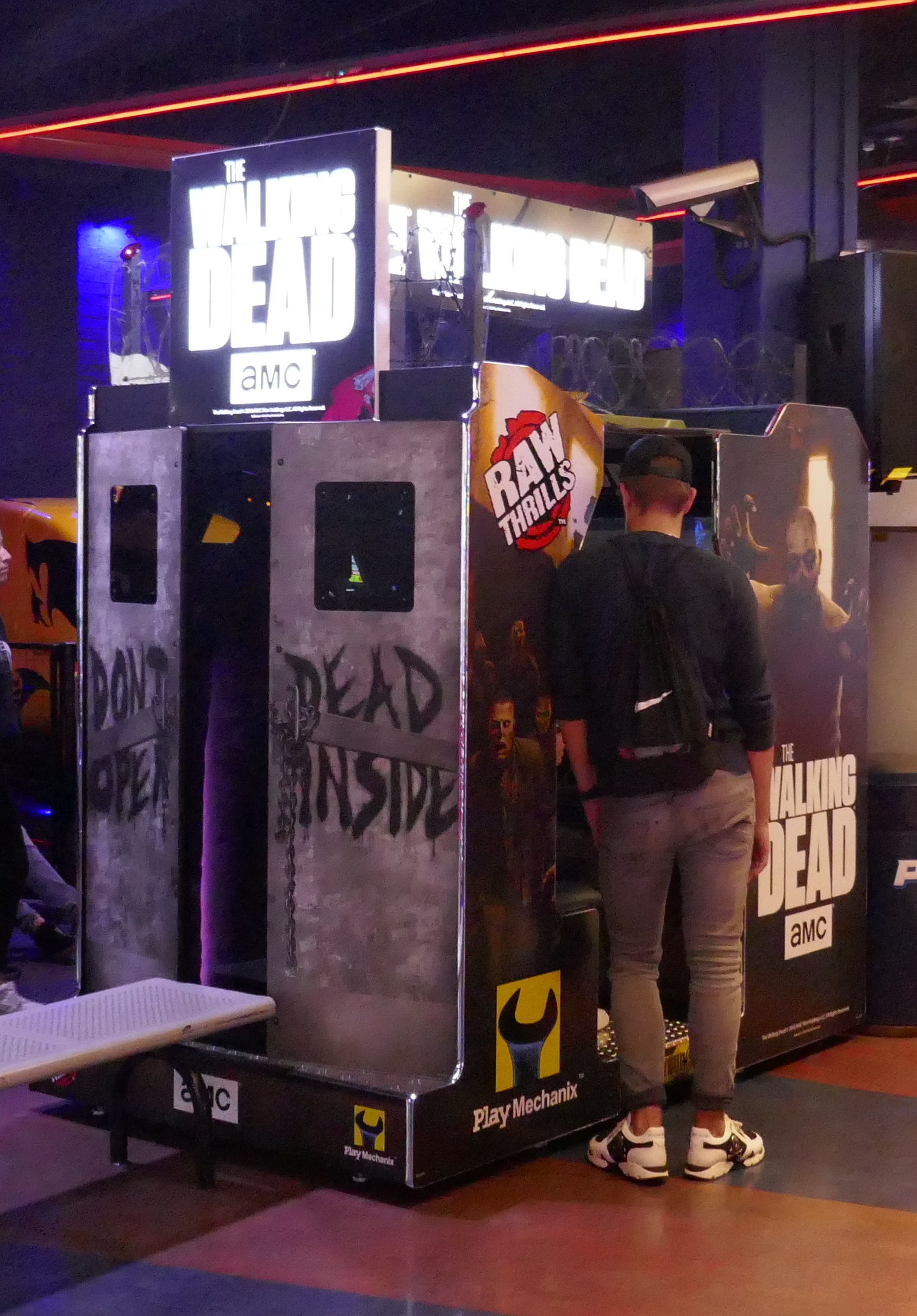
An arcade game based on The Walking Dead

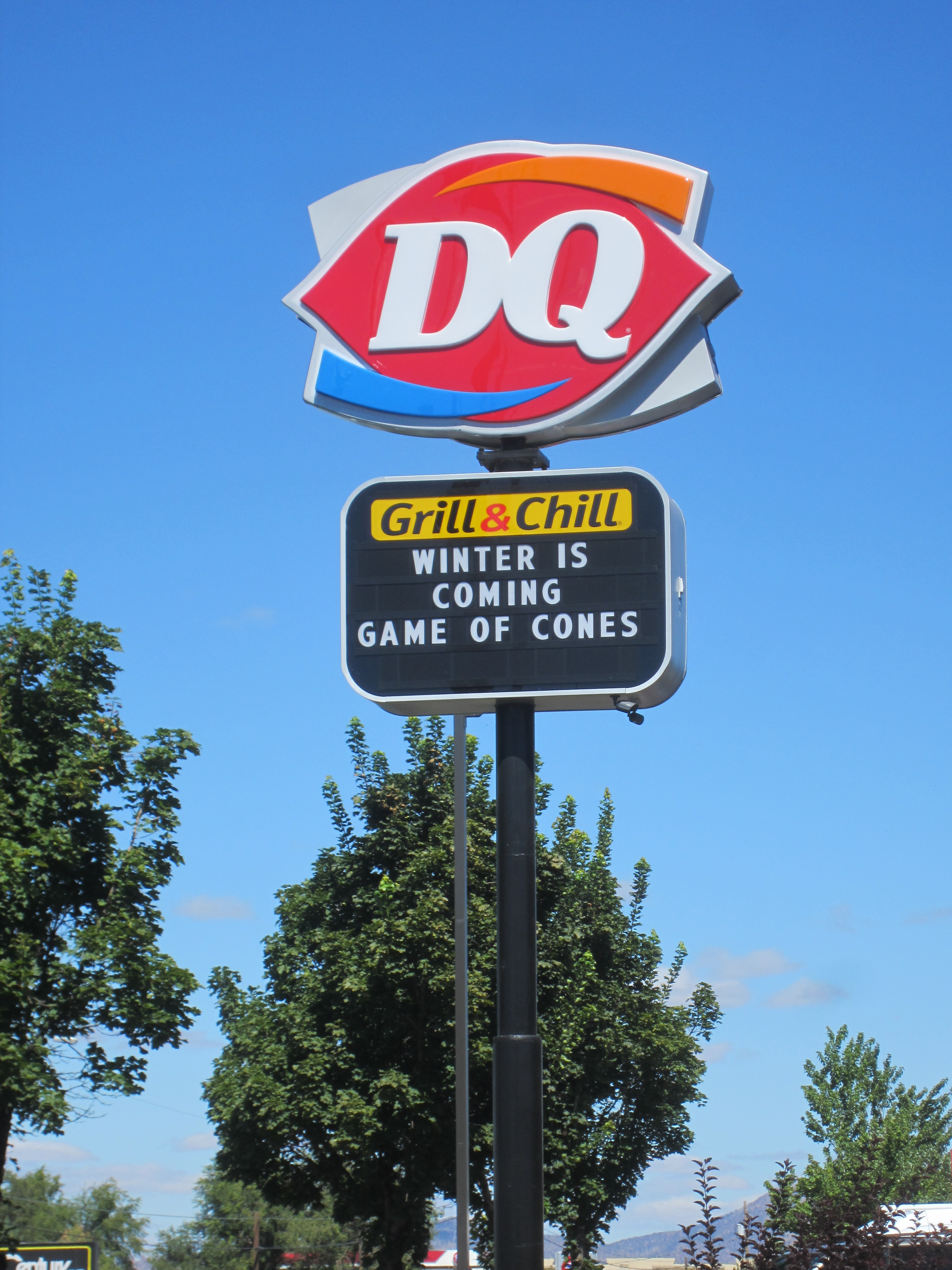
A Dairy Queen sign featuring Game of Thrones references

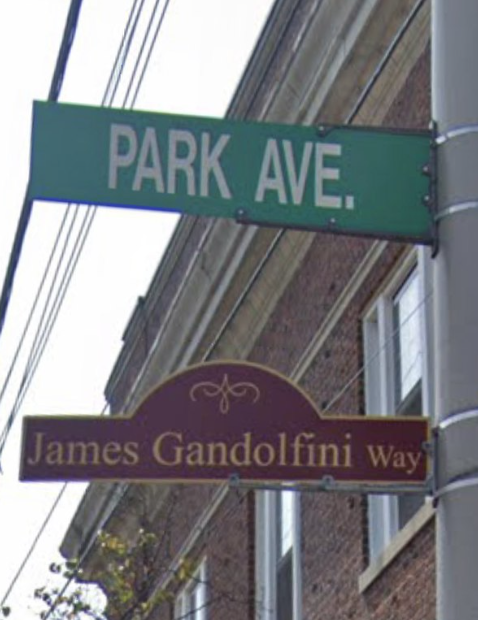
A street in New Jersey named after James Gandolfini, the lead actor on The Sopranos

Characteristics of this golden age include complicated characters who may be morally ambiguous or antiheroes, frequent engagement in questionable behavior, complex plots, hyperserialized storytelling, diverse points of view, playful explorations of modern-day issues, one-shot takes, material often being presented with a TV-MA rating.

Genres of television associated with this golden age include dramas (especially ones originating on cable and digital platforms; some being called "peak bleak" due to the extremely pessimistic nature of shows like Succession and Game of Thrones); sitcoms (especially ones that use comedy-drama which some critics would call "sadcoms"), and adult animation; sketch comedy (especially series linked to alternative comedy and, in the case of Documentary Now, mockumentary); and late-night talk shows (especially ones that emphasize news satire). Such were the shows' popularity and buzzworthiness that aftershows—talk shows specifically created to discuss a specific television program—were created and scheduled in the lead-out slot following Golden Age shows on linear networks.

A key characteristic of the golden age is serialization, where a continuous story arc stretches over multiple episodes or seasons. Traditional American television had an episodic format, with each episode typically consisting of a self-contained story. During the golden age, there has been a transition to a serialization format. John R. Ziegler and Leah Richards note that the serialization format was previously already a key defining characteristic of Japanese anime shows, notably the popular Dragon Ball Z (1989), which distinguished them from American television shows at the time. Serialization later also became a key defining characteristic of American live-action television shows during the golden age. Complicating this is the fact that streaming providers tend to order fewer episodes overall of a series (50 episodes is a common benchmark compared to the traditional 100 episodes sought for traditional off-network syndication, a threshold no streaming-exclusive series has ever reached) and are more willing to arbitrarily cancel a show without warning nor clear criteria for renewal, leading to serialized shows often ending on unresolved cliffhangers, a point of frustration for viewers.

== Criticism ==
The era is not without criticism. The biggest criticisms of the era were the limited audience appeal of shows featuring unlikeable characters, and too many showrunners embracing the "10- to 12-hour movie" structure of stories, resulting in "bloat." Producer and The Shield creator Shawn Ryan said, "You're seeing ideas that should've been movies being elongated into eight episodes, and they don't have the narrative engines to sustain them for that long". Vulture said that "the expensive signifiers of prestige TV — the movie stars, the set pieces, the cinematography — became so familiar and easy to appropriate that it could take viewers six or seven hours to realize the show they were watching was a fugazi". The number of original shows being produced has some, like FX CEO John Landgraf (the person who coined "Peak TV") and Time's TV critic Judy Berman, worried about overwhelming the viewing audience to the point of what the latter called "peak redundancy". Author Daniel Kelley said that this was also the Golden Age of bad TV with shows such as Zoo, Under the Dome, and The I-Land.

Derek Thompson of The Atlantic stated that TV replaced movies as "elite entertainment", but the focus on prestige TV prevented more broadly appealing programs from airing. Damon Lindelof said "TV has become very artisanal", using Swarm as an example of a show that "everybody I know is watching" but his relatives have never heard of. Vulture quoted a "top agent" as decrying the contempt TV people had for mainstream audiences' tastes; "[P]eople seem to really like Two and a Half Men, and none of my writers want to write that. They all want to write Barry. And you know who watches Barry? Nobody". An executive said that while at Amazon Video she received an email every day with the top 100 films by minutes watched: "It was always a lot of Tom Cruise sci-fi movies, action movies from the ’90s and aughts, and Talladega Nights". The Ankler stated that Shōgun was, by contrast, "prestige TV at its best: great television that people actually watched".

Newton Minow, whose landmark 1961 speech "Television and the Public Interest" had highlighted the end of the original golden age of the 1950s, commented that the state of television in 2011, in the midst of the modern golden age and 50 years after the speech, had lost the sense of shared community that the live linear television dominated by a small number of networks had provided. Rick Ellis writing for AllYourScreens.com points out that:

We live in an increasingly niche culture world and that is driven in large part by a universe in which the viewers' screen time is split between everything from TikTok and YouTube to HBO Max and Shudder. That mass culture experience is increasingly a thing of the past and waxing sentimental about it begins to resemble those music fans who moan that the business was so much better when consumers were forced to purchase full-length albums.

Mary McNamara of the Los Angeles Times cited the golden age of TV as one of the reasons behind the 2023 Writers Guild of America strike, which, along with the 2023 SAG-AFTRA strike and the studios' use of artificial intelligence, effectively halted most scripted television production in the United States.

Prestige dramas have been criticized as being similar to one another; most are bleak and grim, with anti-hero qualities in the primary characters. Some journalists have opined that in recent years TV dramas have become cliché, with studios across the television industry creating shows with a familiar feeling.

== See also ==
- Multichannel television in the United States
- Streaming television
- 1990s in television
- 2000s in television
- 2010s in television
- 2020s in television
- Quality television
- Adult animation
- Independent animation
- Binge-watching
- Documentary film
- Hate-watching
- Miniseries
- Telenovela
- New Hollywood
- American independent cinema
- Cinephilia
- Soap opera
- Television film
- Art film
- Nerd culture
- Marvel and DC Comics
- Postmodern television
- Game shows
- True crime
- Pop culture fiction
- Crossover fiction

== Works cited ==
- Pichard, Alexis (2011). Le nouvel âge d'or des séries américaines (in French). Le Manuscrit. ISBN 978-2-304-03784-5. Archived from the original on February 26, 2021.
- Sepinwall, Alan (2013). The Revolution Was Televised: The Cops, Crooks, Slingers, and Slayers Who Changed TV Drama Forever. Simon & Schuster. ISBN 978-1476739670.
