= Financial Interest and Syndication Rules =

Set of rules imposed by the Federal Communications Commission in 1970

The Financial Interest and Syndication Rules, abbreviated fin-syn, were a set of rules imposed by the Federal Communications Commission (FCC) on the United States television industry in 1970.

The FCC sought to prevent the Big Three television networks from monopolizing the broadcast landscape by preventing them from owning any of the programming that they aired in prime time. The rules effectively prohibited networks from airing syndicated television shows they had a financial stake in, leading the networks to spin off their syndicated divisions, such as CBS' CBS Enterprises, which was renamed Viacom in 1971 and spun off; ABC's ABC Films, which was sold to its five executives in March, 1973, and later renamed Worldvision Enterprises; and NBC's syndicated division NBC Films, which was sold to National Telefilm Associates (NTA) in March, 1973, for $7.5 million.

As part of deregulation, the agency's commissioners voted to eliminate the rules in 1993.

== History ==
=== Impact ===
The fin-syn rules changed the power relationships between networks and television producers, who often had to agree to exorbitant profit participation in order to have their shows aired. Some argue the rules brought about a golden era of independent television production by companies such as MTM Enterprises (The Mary Tyler Moore Show) and Norman Lear's Tandem Productions (All in the Family). Others argue the rules made the work of independent television production companies much more difficult because smaller companies could never afford the deficit financing required unless they received network assistance. The rules also led to the destruction of numerous older television tapes in the 1970s; what could not be sold or given away to an independent syndicator was thrown out or recycled to recover silver content.

Controversial from the very beginning, the fin-syn rules were relaxed slightly during the 1980s. They were abolished altogether in April 1993 so US networks could better compete against global competitors like MCA and Columbia Pictures, which were by then owned by the Japanese companies Matsushita Electric and Sony respectively. Other changes in the television industry, such as the rise of the Fox network and cable television, also influenced the repeal.

The repeal of fin-syn made newer broadcast networks such as UPN and The WB financially interesting for their highly vertically integrated parent media conglomerates Paramount Pictures (Viacom) and Time Warner, respectively.

On average, the number of shows that have been broadcast during prime time by the three main networks (CBS, NBC and ABC) per season has ranged between 63 and 75 shows between the 1987-88 and 2001-02 seasons. In the 1987-88 season, out of a total of 66 primetime shows that were broadcast, there were no such shows in which the network was either a producer or a co-producer. This number rose steadily to the point that, during the 1992-93 season, there were about six shows out of a total of 67 shows produced or co-produced by the network; however as a result of the repeal of the fin-syn rules, this figure jumped to 11 the following year, while the total number of shows was barely 73. For the 2001-02 season, this figure rose to 20 shows that were network produced – a change from 0%, to 9%, to 15% and from there to 20% – over two decades.

Today, each of the four major networks has an affiliated syndication company:

- ABC – Disney Platform Distribution/Disney-ABC Domestic Television
- CBS – CBS Media Ventures/Paramount Worldwide Television Licensing & Distribution/Warner Bros. Television Studios
- NBC – NBCUniversal Syndication Studios
- Fox – Fox First Run

Closely related to fin-syn, the Prime Time Access Rule sought to strengthen local and independent producers by preventing affiliates from airing network programming during much of the early evening hours. This rule was eliminated on August 30, 1996. However, the period remains largely unclaimed by the networks due to the success of syndicated programs such as Entertainment Tonight and Wheel of Fortune.

=== Deficit financing ===
Before the fin-syn rules, the networks attained greater control and less risk by forcing production companies to deficit finance their programs while also demanding a percentage of the syndication revenues. Deficit financing is an arrangement in which the network pays the studio that makes a show a license fee in exchange for the right to air the program. The license fee is in exchange for the right to air an episode a few times (as a first-run and rerun episode), and does not cover the complete cost of production. The studio remains in ownership of the show. Before the fin-syn rules were established, networks would put into practice "profit participation." With this, they gained greater control and avoided the risks by forcing the production companies to deficit finance their programs. Such practice led multiple production companies into financial hardships. Independent producers and those not signed with major working studios were hit the hardest because most of the profit revenue went to the networks. Author Amanda D. Lotz explains in her book The Television Will Be Revolutionized that, by the mid-1960s, the networks gained as much as 91% of the programming revenue from profit participation. It was at that point that the government stepped in and got involved with the fin-syn rules in the 1970s.

Deficit financing minimized the substantial risks and costs of developing programs for the networks while initially affording the studios considerable benefits as well. In successful cases, the studio receives a large return on its investment when it re-sells the show in a combination of syndication windows because the sales provide nearly pure profit: no additional work typically goes into the program and the network receives none of the payment. However, if the show is cancelled by the network before producing enough episodes to be syndicated, or if no syndication buyers want the show, the production company must absorb the difference between the cost of production and the original license fee, which can now amount to millions of dollars for each season.

As of 2004, most reality television producers believe that deficit financing will never be financially viable because the vast majority of reality production companies are too small to wait long enough for the big payoff (and, because most reality shows are relatively poor performers in reruns, such a payoff is less likely to materialize anyway). Instead of syndication, producers have been covering gaps between license fees and rising production costs by selling shows' formats to foreign territories and developing integrated marketing deals with advertisers.

=== Rule changes and cancellation ===
The fin-syn rules created two well-defined periods that might be considered characteristics of the multi-channel transition. First, the rise of independent studios provided a competitive environment. Second, The Walt Disney Company, Viacom, News Corporation and Time Warner made purchases that combined studios and networks to create new kinds of corporate entities.

Throughout the 1970s into the mid-1990s, the fin-syn rules broke a few network-era norms that created programming well before the adjustments to the multi-channel transition. This also led to the creation of a fluid competitive environment between network and studios; however, this did not last long.

In 1983, the FCC, by this time in a deregulatory mode inspired by President Ronald Reagan, had received demands from the networks to end the fin-syn rules. In 1991, these had officially materialized, and the agency's commissioners voted to eliminate the rules in 1993. After the rules were eliminated, networks began populating their schedules with new shows purchased from studios owned by the network.

Throughout all this, the audience began to have more choices and control over entertainment options, and networks were pressured to offer fewer reruns to keep viewers' attention, leading networks to create programming.

== See also ==
- Paramount Decree
