= Television deficit financing =

Television deficit financing is the practice of a network or channel paying the studio that creates a show a license fee in exchange for the right to air the show, and in which the license fee is less than the cost of the show. A major broadcast network will ask a program producer to share in the financial risk when considering adopting a new program to its schedule; at least for the first season of the series. Deficit financing is often the norm for scripted television, this came during the Post Network Era. Deficit financing however, does not cover the cost of product, which leads to a deficit for the studio.

Television deficit financing also helps to minimize the substantial risks and costs of developing programs for the networks and gives studios initial benefits as well. The studio bears the difference between production costs and licensing fees, but recoups significantly more money if the show is sold in syndication. The main benefit of deficit financing comes from syndication, this offers different windows for the program, i.e. first run syndication, second run, cable, etc. There is both good and bad to deficit financing, it gives the studios the opportunity to gain major rewards, but they are also taking most of the risk. For networks, they are minimizing most of their risk, but they risk losing out on most profit. If the network orders enough episodes of a show, the studio can then sell the series to other markets. Deficit financing minimizes risks and costs of developing programs for networks.
