= Trade marketing =

Discipline of marketing

Trade marketing is a discipline of marketing that relates to increasing the demand at the wholesaler, retailer, or distributor level rather than at the consumer level. However, there is a need to continue with Brand Management strategies to sustain the need at the consumer end. A shopper, who may or may not be the consumer themself, is the one who identifies and purchases a product from a retailer even though they might not purchase the goods at the end of the day. To ensure that a retailer promotes a company's product against competitors, that company must market its product to the retailers as well by offering steep discounts versus competitors. Trade marketing might also include offering various tangible/intangible benefits to retailers such as commissions made for sales.

Trade marketing is the basic idea of marketing your products through the value chain and at the point of sale i.e. the store. Consider it the thought of creating a demand for your products across the channel and before it reaches the consumer. This traditionally exists in a brick-and-mortar environment and can be argued to be one of the oldest forms of marketing.

== Targets of trade marketing ==
=== Distributor/Dealer ===
Distributors/givers are (part of the route to market) channel trade partners who act as a medium to ensure stock delivery/availability for the consumer across the geographies. The names of these entities are critical as they help in ensuring that the product is widely distributed and available for the end consumer. The key benefit of these entities is in ensuring that the distribution costs are lower for the manufacturer and simultaneously the products are available for the end consumer. The distributor and dealers operate on a base trade margin (factored in the cost of the product by the manufacturer). Along with the base margin the trade partners also get additional schemes/incentives which keep on varying from time to time and product to product. The dealer could be a Retailer (selling to end consumers directly), wholesaler (selling to other retailers primarily) or a modern retailer (i.e. self-service stores like the Walmart, Carrefour, Tesco, Auchan etc. which are into both consumer retailing and wholesaling).

=== Sales outlet ===
A Sales outlet means a retailer. A retailer is also one of the customers in trade marketing targets. Plans of trade marketing are targeting customers and shoppers. Therefore, trade marketing should provide sales outlets with customer & shopper-based value creation plans. Sales outlets (customers) are a place that manufacturer can meet shoppers and consumers.

== Methods of trade marketing ==
Trade marketing methods center on the analysis of core sales fundamentals including distribution, display, promotion and price. Drawing on this analysis together with knowledge of those fundamentals, practitioners develop strategies intended to raise retail demand. Trade marketing supports sales teams by supplying structured plans designed to strengthen these fundamentals, with the aim of increasing both sales volume and value.

== Current trends in trade marketing ==
A current trend in trade marketing is the focus on customer data. According to research conducted by Deloitte in 2016, digital experiences and interactions influence customer spending. This tendency has been noticed by retailers and it has affected their strategies. Retailers focus their efforts on e-mail, mobile, and social media marketing activities in order to deliver personalized consumer experiences. Therefore, marketers have to create comprehensive trade marketing strategies that will be based on customer data, aimed also at the delivery of personalized customer experiences which influence sales and purchasing behaviors.

== Shopper marketing ==
Shopper marketing may be included in trade marketing, therefore the shopper is another target for trade marketing managers, while it can also be considered as a separate discipline. Some of the activities to increase demand at the shopper level include setting the right planogram, price announcements such as inserts, and use of point-of-purchase materials, alternatively called promotional material.

== KPI Trade marketing ==
- active customer base - distribution, sales outlets that buy products of the company
- middle order from a sales outlet
- share trade shelf
- fullness on trade shelf
- regular presence of must stock
- right representation planograms
- accommodation POS
- additional space for products of the company
- lack of OOS
- low level of commodity rests
- Knowledge about products in sales outlets

== See also ==
- Business-to-business
- List of basic marketing topics
- List of marketing topics
- Marketing
- Marketing strategy
- Shopper marketing
