= Fee-for-carriage =

Proposed Canadian television regulatory policy

Fee-for-carriage, value-for-signal, negotiation for value, or the "TV tax" all refer to a proposed Canadian television regulatory policy which would require cable and satellite television companies to compensate conventional, over-the-air television stations for the right to carry their local signals. Such a system has long existed in the United States, under the name of retransmission consent.

Various versions of the scheme are supported by most major conventional broadcasters, and all are opposed by virtually all cable, satellite, and IPTV (telephone company) service providers. These efforts have been promoted through a variety of means, including supporting ads on many conventional TV stations and their affiliated specialty channels, and opposing ads on local stations and during the local ad avails of U.S. cable channels (which are inserted by individual service providers).

== History ==
Various fee-for-carriage proposals have been put before the Canadian Radio-television and Telecommunications Commission (CRTC) a number of times over the years, and rejected each time until 2009. In the past, broadcasters sought to receive a fixed per-subscriber fee to be set by the CRTC; in 2007, broadcasters suggested a rate between 10 cents and $1.00 per subscriber each month. In some major markets there are nearly a dozen local over-the-air stations, which theoretically could have meant a monthly per-subscriber charge of $10 or more, assuming the CRTC had accepted the high end of the suggested range.

In July 2009, the CRTC indicated it was "now of the view that a negotiated solution for compensation for the free market value of local conventional television signals is also appropriate", and would begin setting a process to determine appropriate value for signal at hearings in the fall. However, following a court challenge by Bell Canada arguing it had endorsed fee-for-carriage without giving carriers a chance to provide input, the CRTC said it would look at the concept de novo at those same hearings.

At the same time as the original announcement, as an interim measure, the commission also announced a temporary one-year increase, from 1% to 1.5%, of the fee levied on cable and satellite companies to fund the Local Programming Improvement Fund (LPIF), which supports local programming at stations in smaller markets. The LPIF has been in place since 2008 and is a separate matter from the various signal compensation proposals; however, many cable companies used the increase as an opportunity to introduce the fee as a separate line item on customers' bills.

The CRTC later announced that it had received an order-in-council from the Harper cabinet requesting a separate set of hearings in early December 2009 to specifically consider the views of consumers on the matter, and will submit a report containing recommendations to cabinet shortly thereafter. This means that cabinet will ultimately decide whether or not to allow such fees.

It has been argued that the acquisitions of Global from Canwest by Shaw Communications in 2010 and CTV from CTVglobemedia by Bell Canada Enterprises in 2011 rendered the issue moot. In 2012, the Supreme Court of Canada decided that this issue falls outside of the scope of the CRTC.

== Positions of major media companies ==
=== Local TV Matters coalition ===
The Local TV Matters coalition consists of the CBC (owner of the CBC Television and Radio-Canada networks), CTVglobemedia (owner of CTV and A), Canwest (owner of Global), Remstar (owner of V), and the independently owned CHEK and NTV. Citytv, which was already owned by cable provider Rogers Communications, was the only major television group not to participate in the campaign.

The campaign, which started in mid-2009, was an outgrowth of CTVglobemedia's "Save Local TV" campaign which started earlier that year.

The private broadcasters within this coalition supported a mechanism under which each station would receive the option of either:

- mandatory carriage on all cable systems in their service area without compensation, as is presently mandated for all over-the-air stations, or
- no mandatory carriage rights, but the right to negotiate with service providers for compensation.

In the latter case, stations would be able to withhold their signals, and potentially force blackouts of U.S. stations during programs that would otherwise be simultaneously substituted, from a particular service provider in the absence of a compensation deal. Service providers would likewise not be required to carry stations that had sought, but failed to reach, a compensation agreement with that provider. This system would be similar to the American FCC system of retransmission consent.

The CBC supported the right to negotiate for compensation, but was not willing to waive its mandatory carriage rights due to its status as a public broadcaster. Instead, it would ask for binding arbitration in the event negotiations with service providers failed. The CBC's proposal instead focused primarily on requiring providers to offer a "skinny basic" package containing a small number of basic services, including local stations.

==== Arguments ====
The broadcasters argued that:

- Such a rule is necessary in order for broadcast stations to gain parity with specialty channels, which receive revenues from both a share of cable/satellite subscription fees and advertising.
- Customers are already paying for the ability to receive local stations through cable or satellite, and in many cases believe that some of their fee goes to directly fund local stations, when in fact they receive nothing (although providers do pay into funds that indirectly help broadcast stations, such as the aforementioned LPIF and the Canadian Television Fund).
- Cable and satellite companies make enough profit to cover these increased costs without passing them on to their customers; broadcasters have suggested the CRTC reverse its decision to deregulate basic service rates in the early 2000s, in order to ensure customers aren't forced to pay more.
- The model for conventional television – i.e. generating revenues purely through advertising – has been "broken" for several years, with many smaller stations operating at a loss since the 1990s, and the Great Recession exacerbated the problem.
- Rejecting the proposal could mean the closure of more stations, particularly in small markets. Canwest closed CHCA-TV in August 2009, while CTV closed CKX-TV that October after a deal to sell the station for one dollar fell through; CTV simultaneously announced plans to shut down nearly all of its rebroadcast transmitters in smaller communities. CTV further indicated it may close more stations in the near future if it is unable to receive compensation from service providers. CHCH-DT went bankrupt in December 2015 (it remains on the air in a much lower-budget form).

=== Stop the TV Tax coalition / Shaw ===
Shaw Communications was an early and vocal opponent of fee-for-carriage. Shaw's efforts were later joined by a "Stop the TV Tax" coalition consisting of Rogers Communications (which owns both Rogers Cable and the conventional Citytv and Omni systems), Bell Canada, Bell Aliant, Cogeco, EastLink, and Telus; Shaw's campaign remains separate of this coalition for reasons that are unclear.

==== Arguments ====
Service providers argue:

- Fee-for-carriage would be a tax on their subscription fees, forcing subscribers to pay a monthly charge for stations that would continue to be freely available via the public airwaves, i.e. antenna reception. (Broadcasters dispute the characterization as a "tax" on the grounds that it would not be set or collected by, or for, any government; service providers note that the decision on whether to allow the fees would be made by either the federal government itself or by the CRTC, a federal agency.)
- There is no guarantee that these funds would improve local programming or prevent station closures.
- The implementation of this policy would lead directly to increased basic cable rates for consumers, with most providers promising to list any broadcast-station carriage fees as a separate line item. Some providers suggest that fee increases of up to $10 per month remain a possibility (the broadcasters simply say that such fees would be subject to negotiation, but insist that they do not want consumers to pay more).
- Such fees would be little more than a bailout for these broadcasters' allegedly poor financial management, i.e. buying expensive American programming or purchasing other media outlets, as opposed to producing more distinctive local or Canadian programming (the broadcasters have not directly responded to these claims, but historically, buying American programming has in fact been less expensive than producing Canadian programming).
- CTV's and Canwest's costs of running local stations can be offset by their more profitable specialty channel assets (broadcasters respond that specialty channels often have multiple partners and hence cannot be easily used to subsidize other properties).
- The fact that broadcast stations are carried by cable and satellite providers at all, not to mention simultaneous substitution privileges over U.S. stations, already provide a significant benefit to broadcasters (broadcasters argue that Canada is the only major English-speaking country to allow such wide distribution of the "big four" U.S. networks and hence that simsubs are necessary to protect their own broadcast rights).

=== Quebecor ===
Quebecor Media, owner of French-language network TVA as well as Quebec's largest cable company Videotron, also supports the principle of signal compensation but believes these funds should instead be deducted from the existing fees for specialty channels, rather than being either passed on to consumers or absorbed by service providers.

=== Other independent small-market broadcasters ===
Other companies that own small-market TV stations affiliated with other networks, such as Jim Pattison Group, Newcap, and Corus Entertainment (an affiliate of Shaw), do not explicitly support or oppose signal compensation, saying that this would have limited impact on their revenues given the small markets in which they operate. Their primary concern is instead maintaining carriage on satellite providers, which have now overtaken cable in many rural markets.
