= Post-network era =

Era of television following the end of the network era

The post-network era, also known as the post-broadcast era, is a concept in American television that was popularized by Amanda D. Lotz. It denotes the period that started in the late 1990s, following television's multi-channel transition. This post-network period saw the deterioration of the dominance of the Big Three television networks (ABC, CBS and NBC in the United States), and the creation of a wide variety of cable television channels that catered specifically to niche groups. Concurrent with the Second Golden Age of Television, it saw the development of networks that delivered a wider diversity of programming choice, less constraints on a consumers choice of medium, decentralization of the location of viewing, and freedom of choice over time of viewing.

For Amanda D. Lotz, the post-network era has been defined by five C's: "choice, control, convenience, customization, and community". These five concepts, which have defined the post-network era, all relate to the ways in which viewers have greater access to a wider array of content which can be consumed on their own terms. The concept comes from the field of Television studies, and has been used by various academics to discuss numerous different topics. The concept has been endorsed by media scholar Henry Jenkins, co-director of the Media Industries Project Michael Curtin, and American Studies, and Film and Media professor Jason Mittell.

== Major developments ==
Vast modifications were made to the way in which the television industry was operated following the earlier Network era and a period of Multi-channel transition. The major factor governing the transition to a post-network paradigm was a computational and generational shift in the audience. These emergent developments in the post-network era have led television audiences to split attention between many different channels, devices, and forms of media as Television programs are no longer confined to the Television set.

=== Timeshifting technologies ===
The development of technologies with timeshifting abilities such as the VCR and DVR rendered broadcast times irrelevant, and also shifted discussion away from simple differentiation between cable and free-to-air television. Although much of this technological change coincided with the Multi-channel transition, its effect can be felt well into the post-network era, creating the groundwork for future technological developments including Hulu and Netflix On-Demand.

=== Digitization of content ===
The increasing digitization of content has presented viewers with an increasing level of access to high quality televisual content on DVD and online. This has fostered the development of new portable methods of delivering media that help to bring television to spaces outside of the home. Consequently, multiple new revenue streams have emerged as television networks are able to sell shows through online storefronts like iTunes. The DVD market, too, has become a financially viable place to extract additional profits from television shows post-broadcast. In the case of animated sitcom Family Guy, this even led to the show's renewal in 2005 due to strong DVD sales, four years after its initial cancellation.

=== Changes to advertising ===
In order to reap the benefits of advertising in an era where television programs are no longer necessarily watched first-run on network television station, advertisers have innovated, using product placement in more popular television shows and producing their own branded entertainment, a form of media in which the content and advertising messages are inextricably linked. This differs from traditional advertising practices that only saw the broadcast of a number of 30-second adverts in chunks during pre-planned ad-breaks.

=== Web 2.0 technologies ===
A major aspect of the post-network era has been the development of new technologies that change the ways in which television is consumed and distributed. These technological changes have come about with the invention of the tablet, the use of smart phones, web-enabled devices connected to the television like many modern gaming consoles saw the subsequent development and wide uptake of online VOD services like Netflix and Hulu, as well as specific, network-branded streaming services. This shift in technology created a new-found level of convenience and mobility for viewers, as television trends towards a situation in which you can watch "whatever show you want, whenever you want, on whatever screen you want". Amanda D. Lotz argues that technologies like Netflix and NBC, Fox, and ABC's own Hulu have clearly impacted the way in which we access television, allowing us to catch up on television shows whenever we please rather than adhering to a first run schedule. Hulu also allows for interaction between fans of television shows while they are watching episodes through the site's inbuilt comment feature, creating the sort of immersive media experience and fostering a participatory culture of affiliation, two major interests of Henry Jenkins. This technological change also brings a change in theatricality, as television producers respond to the ways in which their audiences watch television.

=== Content in the post-network era ===
One major development in the post-network era has been a fragmented cable network system, with each network presenting contents to cater to specific target audiences rather than a homogeneous mass audience. Magazines had done this for similar reasons a century earlier. As consumers began to watch television programs on tablets and cell phones in their own time, niche channels emerged from the expansion of cable television networks, advertising became integrated into television shows rather than ad-breaks, and people were no longer tied to a 24-week first-run broadcast cycle.

Producers responded to changing consumption patterns by changing the ways in which they produce television content, which resulted in the creation of shows like Sex and the City, Breaking Bad and Arrested Development (which aired on network television) with features that were unrepresentative of those developed in the Network era and during the Multi-channel transition.

== See also ==
- History of television
- 1990s in television
- 2000s in television
- 2010s in television
- 2020s in television
- Streaming television
