= Niche market =

Subset of the market

A niche market is the subset of the market on which a product is appealed to a small group of consumers. The market niche defines the product features aimed at satisfying specific market needs, as well as the price range, production quality and the demographics that it is intended to target. It is also a small market segment. Sometimes, a product or service can be entirely designed to satisfy a niche market.

Not every product can be defined by its market niche. The niche market is highly specialized, and it aims to survive amid competition from numerous super companies. Even established companies create products for different niches: for example, HP has all-in-one machines for printing, scanning and faxing targeted for the home office niche, while at the same time having separate machines with one of these functions for big businesses.

In practice, product vendors and trade businesses are commonly referred to as mainstream providers or narrow demographics niche market providers (colloquially shortened to just niche market providers). Small capital providers usually opt for a niche market with narrow demographics as a measure of increasing their financial gain margins.

The final product quality (low or high) is not dependent on the price elasticity of demand but on the specific needs that the product is aimed at satisfying and, in some cases, aspects of brand recognition (e.g., prestige, practicality, money saving, expensiveness, environmental consciousness, or social status). When needs or desires have specific or even complex characteristics, the market niche requires specialized suppliers that are capable of meeting such expectations.

== Niche audience ==
Unlike mass audiences, which represent a large number of people, a niche audience is an influential smaller audience. In television, technology and many industrial practices changed with the post-network era, niche audiences are now in much greater control of what they watch. In this context of greater viewer control, television networks and production companies are trying to discover ways to profit through new scheduling, new shows, and relying on syndication. This practice of "narrowcasting" also allows advertisers to have a more direct audience for their messages.

With few exceptions, such as American Idol, the Super Bowl and the Olympics, it is not common for a substantial audience to watch a program at once. Still, networks do target particular demographics. Lifetime targets women and MTV targets youth. Sports channels, for example, STAR Sports, ESPN, ESPN 2, ESPNU, STAR Cricket, FS1, FS2 and CBS Sports Network, target the niche market of sports enthusiasts.

== See also ==
- Market segmentation
- History of marketing
- Mass market
- Marketing strategy
