= Amalgamated Advertising =

Advertising agency

Amalgamated LLC
- Company type: Independent
- Industry: Advertising, Marketing
- Founded: 2003
- Defunct: 2015
- Headquarters: New York, NY, USA
- Key people: Jason Gaboriau; Doug Cameron; Charles Rosen; Eric Silver; Brian Martin and Fiona McBride
- Website: silverpartners.com

Amalgamated Advertising was an independent advertising agency based in New York City. The agency was founded in 2003 by Douglas Cameron, Jason Gaboriau and Charles Rosen, and became known for its "cultural branding" approach.

Eric Silver, former Executive Creative Director of BBDO, joined Amalgamated in September 2010 as Chief Creative Officer and majority partner. Silver and Amalgamated’s founding partners had worked together for several years while at Cliff Freeman and Partners.

In September 2012, the agency changed its name to Silver + Partners. In early 2015, the agency ceased operations.

The agency's clients included Ben & Jerry's, Qdoba, The Coca-Cola Company, MSG Networks, The Patron Spirits Company and CarMax.
