= Multichannel television =

Television service provider

A multichannel television service, also known as simply a television provider, is a type of service provider who distributes television programming to its customers for a subscription fee. Subscription television providers distribute television channels that offer different types of programming, typically including local television stations within their market (including, where applicable, state broadcasters), specialty channels that are distributed solely through multichannel television providers, and pay television services that offer premium content such as feature films and other original programming.

Subscription television services can be distributed to customers through various means, including wireline media such as cable and fiber-optic wire, direct broadcast satellite, and using internet protocols—either over a private network maintained by the provider, or as an "over-the-top" service streamed over the public internet. Equipment is provided to customers in order to receive the service, usually featuring one or more proprietary set-top boxes or some other equipment to decrypt the provided signals. Digital multichannel services typically feature an electronic program guide that can be used to browse available channels, and offer digital video recorders (DVR), which can record programmes to an internal hard drive for later viewing, as well as other interactive features such as access to streaming video services, and other video on demand and pay-per-view services.

Multichannel television is typically sold in bundles, consisting of service tiers with different channels added at each level, along with themed packages of channels that can be added to the service, typically covering specific niches or genres such as children's programming, sports, and individual premium services. Some providers may offer an "A la carte" option, where customers can purchase additional channels outside of bundles. A television provider may offer other services, such as broadband internet and home phone, and provide incentives to customers for subscribing to them all as a bundle; these are referred to as a "triple play".

== Programming ==
Multichannel television programming is often divided between free-to-air channels, specialty channels not carried FTA (colloquially referred to as "cable channels" in the United States), and pay television (or "premium") services. Some countries may have "must-carry" rules requiring television providers to carry specific FTA channels and other services, including local stations and national networks (such as state and/or public networks), and other networks of crucial public interest (such as public affairs networks). Most specialty networks are funded by advertising and carriage fees paid by the television provider for the privilege to distribute the channel to its subscribers. Specialty channels can either target a general population similarly to FTA networks or aim to serve specific demographics or niches.

Digital multichannel television platforms have more bandwidth than analog cable services, meaning that there is channel capacity for more specialty channels catering to particular television market demographics or interests. In North America, the term "basic cable" often refers to the most widely carried specialty channels (in contrast to the channels launched primarily on digital cable and satellite only, due to their expanded capacity). In the U.S., Nielsen's top 10 "basic cable" channels of 2018 (on either full day or prime time viewership) included general entertainment networks such as Hallmark Channel, TBS, TNT, and USA Network, factual networks such as History, HGTV, and Investigation Discovery, national news services such as CNN, Fox News Channel, and MSNBC, the children's channel Nickelodeon, and sports network ESPN.

Pay television channels are premium services funded by subscription fees paid by the customer, rather than advertising. They typically deal in premium content, such as feature films (typically within a release window between their theatrical release and their release on home video), and original series and specials. Some entertainment-oriented premium services have broadcast occasional sporting events; in the United States, premium networks such as HBO and Showtime are well known for their broadcasts of boxing (HBO ended its boxing telecasts in 2018). Due to their cost and more limited availability, premium networks are usually more lenient in regards to content, and may air content largely uncensored (by contrast, in the United States, many basic cable networks self-censor their programming for violent, profane, and sexual content because of viewer and advertiser expectations, and broadcast channels are restricted by law on their airing of "indecent" material). Some premium networks may broadcast (particularly in late-night hours), or are dedicated entirely, to pornography. A modern premium service typically consists of multiple channels, including a main flagship channel, and several "multiplex" channels focusing on certain genres or demographics.

== By country ==
=== Canada ===
In Canada, a multichannel television service is legally referred to as a broadcast distribution undertaking (BDU), and they must be licensed by the Canadian Radio-television and Telecommunications Commission.

=== United States ===
In the United States, a multichannel television service subject to FCC oversight and policies is legally referred to as a multichannel video programming distributor (MVPD).

== See also ==
- Geographical usage of television
- Cable television by region
- List of cable television companies
- Satellite television by region
- List of satellite television companies
- Cable television
- Satellite television
