= Least objectionable program =

The theory of the least objectionable program (LOP) is a mediological theory explaining television audience behavior. It was developed in the 1960s by then executive of audience measurement at NBC, Paul L. Klein, who was greatly influenced by the media theorist Marshall McLuhan's Understanding Media.

The theory also promoted discussion in the legal world about what qualified as "objectionable programming," and how this lack of definition prompted a complex series of legal battles in the United States.

== "Why You Watch What You Watch When You Watch" ==
In an article "Why You Watch What You Watch When You Watch" (published in TV Guide in 1971), Klein explained that viewers consume the medium of television rather than television shows, treating the medium as the end of their consumption itself rather than using the set as a means to access specific programs they like the way they might choose a book from a shelf to access the story within. Since the introduction of television, the same percentage of sets are in use on, say, a Thursday evening at a certain hour, year after year, regardless of what content is broadcast.

This is because unlike the way people use books, museums, or the cinema as means of consuming desired content, audiences consume television, the medium, as the desired object. TV viewers turn the set on, deciding to "watch television", and then seek out something to watch from what is available, flipping around, not until they find "something they like" – because television programming is in fact very rarely satisfying, and viewers rarely watch anything they actually like – but until they find something that doesn't offend them enough to make them switch to the next channel.

Viewers almost never turn off the set as a result of finding nothing tolerable and judging every program available boring or otherwise objectionable. Viewers commonly watch programs they describe later as unbearable, everything else on being even more intolerable. A more common response to a whole spectrum of equally unendurable choices than choosing to abandon the medium is to continue to flip frequently until new choices become available.

Thus, for programmers of television channels, Klein recommended understanding that audience attraction was a matter not of pleasing the greatest number of viewers but of offending the fewest, driving the fewest away to the competitors who may repulse them less. The television audience is in a kind of partial trance. A network will do better worrying less about not giving an audience enough to like, to be surprised and delighted by, and to engage their attention, than about avoiding, as Klein said, "disturbing their reverie" with something that causes them to change the channel. Thus, even as channel choices proliferate alongside numerous easily accessed out-of-schedule viewing options, successful television programs remain, as they have always been, formulaic, cliché, "instantly familiar," predictable, and monotonous in tone.

== Least offensive programming ==
Least offensive programming (sometimes abbreviated as LOP) was a strategy employed mainly by major US television networks, approximately from the 1940s to late 1970s, where viewer numbers were thought to be sustained by television programming that offended the fewest viewers. The result was an often mass-produced, bland output of popular culture focused on leisure, targeting the American middle class. The theory was popularized by Klein.

=== Examples of LOP guidelines ===
- Fairly positive images of a show
- Can deal with serious issues but still needs to be upbeat
- Likeable characters
- Lack of controversy
- Remember the dynamics of TV today

== List of shows labeled as LOP ==
- NCIS: New Orleans
- Madam Secretary
- Scorpion
- Grace Under Fire
- Just Shoot Me
- Murphy Brown
- Roseanne

== Legal implications of objectionable programming ==
Along with the networks’ desire to produce non-objectionable content, the American government sought to more closely regulate programming. Legal scholars in the 1960s and 70s tried to carve out definitions for “objectionable programming” that reflected the morals of the American populace while still respecting the First Amendment. Many legal scholars questioned who exactly had the right to define the term, especially in relation to legal proceedings. Generally, it was agreed that this right fell to the Federal Communications Commission (FCC), but there was more disagreement on what actions the FCC could realistically take to prevent objectionable programming from reaching audiences. With the threat of legal trouble, major networks began largely self-censoring to avoid any possible consequences.

== Obsolescence of the theory ==
It has been widely suggested that the theory itself is obsolete thanks to high quality shows, top-rated options and viewers' choice of shows whether live or time-shifted alongside the advancements of DVDs, HBO and Netflix.

HBO in particular has been pushing the boundaries of LOP for decades. The network’s “boutique” style of paid programming carved out a niche for more controversial creative endeavors. Game of Thrones is one of the network’s biggest successes, and its abundance of gore, mature language, and sexual violence has been highlighted as signal that LOP is no longer applicable in modern television.
