= Fringe time =

Television programming times

In broadcast programming, fringe time refers to two dayparts:

- early fringe - the hour lead-in prime time
- late fringe - the late-night television program slot following late-night news

== Definition ==
Dayparts in US television, with fringes in green

Fringe time is widely used in television to denote the evening television hours that precede and follow the prime time. The television hours that precede the prime time is called early fringe, which is usually between 4 p.m. to 7:30 p.m. Late fringe is the television hours that follow the prime time, which is usually between 11 p.m. to 1 a.m.

== History ==
During the first two decades of American television, the early fringe was considered a part of prime time, which began programming a half-hour earlier than it did in the present day. In 1971, in an effort to loosen the hegemony the Big Three television networks had on television in the United States, the Federal Communications Commission implemented two rules, the Financial Interest and Syndication Rules (fin-syn), which prohibited the networks from owning interests in syndicators; and the Prime Time Access Rule, which prohibited networks from programming a one-hour slot in the evening hour, the slot now known as fringe time.

The intent of the new rules was to encourage individual station licensees to produce more local programming. In practice, this failed, and the slot was (and largely remains) dominated by syndicated programming. Game shows already airing in daytime on the Big Three networks quickly filled many of the new slots, ostensibly funneled through syndicators but produced on the same sets with most of the same personnel (except sometimes a different host) as their network counterparts, defeating much of the purpose of the new rule. One such program, Wheel of Fortune, has survived in syndication since that era, outlasting the show's network run. Sister program Jeopardy!, after a failed attempt at syndication in 1974 near the end of its network run, returned as an independent show a decade later, with both it and Wheel being fringe time fixtures in the decades since.

Although during the early days of these new rules, local stations typically carried a hodge-podge of weekly shows, by the 1980s almost all fringe time programming was strip programming at least five and sometimes six days a week, a pattern that remains to the present day.

Other formats that filled fringe time over the years include news magazine (mostly syndicated entertainment-based programs), music-based shows (such as Hee Haw, Solid Gold, America's Top 10, and Dance Fever), and off-network rerun, usually sitcom. Local news, occasionally seen in the time slot in the early years of television, has seen a renaissance in the time slot in the 21st century. Occasionally other formats more commonly seen in daytime television such as talk shows or court shows are used to program the slot, but because it leads into the network prime time lineups, these shows are expected to be highly rated and retain a large audience, and thus only the highest-rated shows in these genres (such as Judge Judy) are ever used in this manner.

Both fin-syn and the Prime Time Access Rule have since been repealed; the networks, although they have reacquired most of the syndicators they were forced to spin off, have never resumed directly programming the fringe time slots they were forced to abandon, except for occasional sports and special programming.

Independent station and non-Big Three network affiliates, because they lack access to network late-night shows, have had to program both the early fringe and the late fringe with similar approaches.

== See also ==
- Dayparting
- Daytime television in the United States
- Graveyard slot
- Prime time
- Late night television in the United States
