= Daytime television =

Block of television programming occurring between mid-morning and late afternoon

United States Television dayparting; daytime television in red.

Daytime is a block of television programming taking place during the late-morning and afternoon on weekdays. Daytime programming is typically scheduled to air between the hours of 9:00 a.m. and 5:00 p.m., following the early morning daypart typically dedicated to morning shows and preceding the evening dayparts that eventually lead into prime time.

The majority of daytime programming is typically targeted towards women (and in particular, housewives). Historically, court shows, game shows, soap operas, & talk shows have been fixtures of daytime programming, although daytime soap operas have seen declines in North America due to changing audiences and viewing habits. This type of daytime programming is typically aired on weekdays; weekend daytime programming is often very different and more varied in nature, and usually focuses more on sports broadcasts.

== Target audience and demographics ==
For most intents and purposes, the traditional target audience of daytime television programs in the United States has been demographically women 18–49, as the large majority of daytime viewership has historically consisted of housewives. As such, daytime programs are often hosted by women or personalities popular among women, and pertain to subjects such as women's issues (including health, lifestyles, and fashion), current events, and gossip.

Due to demographic shifts and the decreasing number of people at home during the daytime, the daytime television audience has shrunk rapidly in recent years, and this which remains is largely over the age of 55 and thus considered undesirable for most advertisers.

Another popular audience in this timeframe is the college student; game shows such as the original Jeopardy! (1964–1975), Match Game (1973–1982; 1990), Family Feud (1976–1985; 1988–1993; 1994; 1999–present), Card Sharks (1978–1981; 1986–1989), Press Your Luck (1983–1986), and, since the 1990s and even more so under current host Drew Carey, The Price Is Right (1972–present), have targeted this audience.

== Content ==
In Anglophone territories (the United Kingdom, United States, Canada, and Australia), talk show (hosted by a single personality, or a larger panel, such as The View and Loose Women) are a significant part of this timeslot, as well as, to a lesser extent, game show and soap opera. In the U.S., the Big Three television networks all provide some degree of daytime programming, but the once-popular genre of soap operas have declined; although a few remain active, they have been largely replaced by less-expensive programming such as talk shows (including GMA3: What You Need To Know, The Talk, and Today with Hoda & Jenna, which fill timeslots once filled by One Life to Live, As the World Turns, and Passions respectively, with two of them serving officially as extensions of their networks' respective morning shows). Game shows were also common in U.S. daytime lineups, but by the 1990s, only CBS's long-running The Price Is Right remained (which was later joined in 2009 by a revival of Let's Make a Deal, which replaced the cancelled soap Guiding Light). Daytime game shows are still relatively popular in the United Kingdom: the long-running Countdown has been a fixture of Channel 4's daytime schedule since the network's launch in 1982, and was also the first program aired by the channel.

In the U.S., syndicated programming is most common during the daytime hours on broadcast stations, such as news-based programs (often dealing with entertainment news and gossip), talk shows (including personality-based programs, lifestyle-oriented programs, or tabloid talk shows with a focus on sensationalism and controversial subjects) hosted by a single personality or a larger panel, as well as court shows, game shows, and syndicated reruns of popular sitcoms and dramas. Notable syndicated daytime programs in the U.S. have included The Ellen DeGeneres Show, The Steve Wilkos Show, Dr. Phil, Judge Judy, Live with Kelly and Mark, Maury, The Wendy Williams Show, The Oprah Winfrey Show, America's Court with Judge Ross, & The Kelly Clarkson Show.

In Canada, daytime lineups on the major commercial networks are nearly identical in programming to their American counterparts (and often include network and syndicated daytime programs from the U.S., with timeslots adjusted by market to allow the invocation of simsub rights), although they typically schedule at least one original lifestyle or talk show (such as The Marilyn Denis Show and The Social on CTV Television Network, CityLine on Citytv, and The Morning Show on Global), or reruns of other library programs, to help comply with Canadian content quotas. CBC Television devotes its morning schedule to children's educational programming, while the remainder is typically devoted to reruns of other CBC programs, and imported programs from the UK and Australia (the network's most recent attempt at a daytime lifestyle show, The Goods, was cancelled in 2018). Although it had done so in the past, CBC no longer carries syndicated American programming.

Local newscasts may also air during the daytime period, typically featuring continuing coverage of events that had occurred since the morning news, and "soft" stories on entertainment headlines, lifestyle topics, and local events. Some stations may produce daytime talk shows that are built around advertorials brokered by local businesses.

Meanwhile, news channels usually program rolling news coverage with anchors, where a set schedule of stories is followed (as opposed to evening and prime time, which typically focus on opinion-driven programs hosted by pundits), but can be interrupted at any time for breaking news stories and other live events. Business day similarly falls within the daytime hours for channels devoted to business news, whose audience is concentrated towards out-of-home viewers. Children's television networks usually use the 9 a.m.–3 p.m. timeslot before children of school age return home to air preschool programming for young viewers, while PBS member stations might either carry exclusively children's programming, instructional programming to be taped for later use, or other library content.

Other basic cable networks generally rerun episodes of their current prime time programming, often in marathon blocks; stations that devote much of their programming to acquired reruns may also follow this strategy, or use the daytime slot to burn off a contract for a less popular program (in this sense, daytime can be seen, much like the overnight, to be a graveyard slot that is wasteful to program with high-budget content).

Daytime lineups on sports-oriented networks are typically devoted to studio programs with news, analysis, and discussion of sports-related topics (in the United States, some of these programs are simulcast from syndicated sports talk radio shows), but may also feature reruns of recent or "classic" events, lesser-viewed and niche events, or other original programming. It is not uncommon for live events to occur domestically during the daytime hours — particularly for events taking place in the prime time hours of other regions (such as the Asia-Pacific in Europe, and Europe in North America), or domestic play in outdoor sports such as baseball, cricket, golf, and tennis. While occasionally encountered on weekdays, this is especially true on weekends, when broadcasts of association football (soccer) and American football are a pervasive fixture of weekend television in the autumn months (with European football fixtures often airing in the morning and early afternoon in North America, U.S. college football typically playing on Saturday afternoons, and the professional NFL on Sunday afternoons).

The Philippines has the noontime variety show, a format largely unique to that country.

== See also ==
- Daytime television in the United States

Preceded by Breakfast television	Television dayparts 10:00 AM – 6:30 PM	Succeeded by Early fringe
