= Rush hour (disambiguation) =

Rush hour is the two parts of the day with busy traffic caused by commuting.

Rush hour may also refer to:

== Film ==
- The Rush Hour, a 1928 American silent comedy film
- Rush Hour (1941 film), a British film
- Rush Hour (2006 film), a Russian film
- Rush Hour (franchise), a series of American action comedy films
  - Rush Hour (1998 film), the first film in the series

== Games ==
- Rush Hour (puzzle), a 1996 sliding block puzzle
- Rush Hour (video game), a 1997 racing game
- SimCity 4: Rush Hour, a 2003 expansion pack for SimCity 4

== Music ==
=== Bands ===
- Rush Hour (band), a jazz fusion and rock band from Chicago, Illinois that was active in the 1980s and 1990s

=== Albums ===
- Rush Hour (Joe Lovano album), 1995
- Rush Hour (soundtrack), the soundtrack to the 1998 film

=== Songs ===
- "Rush Hour" (Armin van Buuren composition), an instrumental, 2007
- "Rush Hour" (Christopher Lawrence composition), an instrumental, 2004
- "Rush Hour" (Crush song), 2022
- "Rush Hour" (Jane Wiedlin song), 1988
- "Rush Hour", a song by Juice WRLD
- "Rush Hour", by Brad from Best Friends?, 2010
- "Rush Hour", by XO from Fashionably Late, 2025

== Television and radio ==
- Rush Hour (American TV series), a 2016 series based on the film series
- Rush Hour (British TV series), a 2007 sketch show
- Час пик, (English: Rush Hour), a Russian TV show hosted by Vladislav Listyev
- The Rush Hour (Triple M), branding for several sport- and comedy-themed radio shows on the Triple M network in Australia

== Other ==
- Rush Hour (sculpture), a 1987 sculpture in the City of London

== See also ==
- Dayparting
- Drive time
- Morning drive
