= Dayparting =

Practice of dividing broadcast schedules

In broadcast programming, dayparting is the practice of dividing the broadcast day into several parts, in which a different type of radio programming or television show appropriate for that time period is aired. Television programs are most often geared toward a particular demography, and what the target audience typically engages in at that time.

== North America ==
=== On radio ===
Nielsen Audio (known as Arbitron until it merged with Nielsen Holdings in 2013), the leading audience measurement service in the United States, divides a weekday into five dayparts: morning drive time (6:00–10:00 a.m.), midday (10:00 a.m.–3:00 p.m.), afternoon drive (3:00–7:00 p.m.), evenings (7:00 p.m.–midnight) and overnight (midnight–6:00 a.m.).

In radio broadcasting through most of the 1990s, dayparting was also used for censorship purposes. Many songs that were deemed unsuitable for young listeners were played only during the late evening or overnight hours, when children were presumably asleep. Even today, the Federal Communications Commission (FCC) dictates less stringent decency requirements for programming aired between the hours of 10:00 p.m. and 6:00 a.m. local time.

The drive time dayparts coincide with rush hour; these dayparts are traditionally the most listened-to portions of the schedule, since these are the times when most people are in their cars, where vehicle audio remain nearly ubiquitous. Most stations (both talk and music) air local programming in one or both drive time slots. The midday, or "at work" slot, has in recent years become particularly prone to voice-tracking, as large station ownership groups cut costs and use supposedly local DJs at multiple stations (often in different time zones). Music stations often are careful not to repeat songs during the midday shift, as they generally have a captive audience, and will often use "9 to 5 No Repeat Workdays" and all-request or specialty lunch hours to lure listeners and air a broader variety of music. Evenings are a popular time for syndicated programs, while overnights are generally automated, either with or without a voice-tracked DJ, though there are a few niche programs that target special audiences in the overnight and early morning hours (Coast to Coast AM, Red Eye Radio and The National Farm Report, among them). On weekends, music stations often air syndicated programming, without regard to time slots (though Saturday nights often remain live with either local or syndicated hosts, especially on oldies and country music stations, to take requests) and talk stations air niche network shows or brokered programming. Religious programming often airs on Sunday mornings.

In talk radio, where voice tracking is impossible and syndicated content is live and national, these lines blur somewhat. The Clay Travis and Buck Sexton Show (formerly The Rush Limbaugh Show from 1988 to 2021) airs in a time slot that is in midday in all time zones, but other than that and overnight shows such as Coast to Coast AM, a show that airs in a slot corresponding to afternoon drive time in the Pacific Time Zone (for instance, The Lars Larson Show) would fall into a less-listened-to evening time slot on the East Coast. Similarly, a show that airs during early midday on the East Coast (such as the Glenn Beck Program) would be aired during the morning drive time period on the West Coast, and may not live up to the expectations of listeners expecting local, informative content. The general solution for this problem is to broadcast delay programming to fit schedules, though another problem develops where West Coast listeners are unable to interact with those programs unless they stream them live from a station east of them, or they have a live video simulcast via a television channel or streaming services.

=== On television ===
Approximate American television broadcast dayparts for weekdays (Eastern Time Zone)

In the United States, dayparting is by far the most common among the Big Three television networks (ABC, NBC and CBS), all three of which continue to produce programming for a wide array of audiences (a programming strategy known as full-service radio). This is also generally true of other countries where the major terrestrial broadcasters have more general audiences.

Cable and satellite channels, most of which cater to smaller niche audiences, generally use much simpler programming strategies: infomercials in the morning, rerun (often in block programming or marathon format) in the daytime, and feature programming in prime time, replayed in late night (though this structure varies, some channels may opt not to lease out certain time periods to infomercials and program overnight and morning time periods with entertainment programs instead). United States cable news outlets typically program a network-style morning show, rolling news coverage in the daytime with opinion programming or long-form documentaries at night; ESPN follows a similar format, but with sporting events in prime time, while its opinion programs air primarily on sister outlet ESPN2. Stations such as MTV, BET and VH1 that feature music programming may devote their morning and/or midday blocks to music videos. Children's channels such as Disney Channel and Nickelodeon generally air programs for preschool children during the early morning hours in the form of blocks such as Nick Jr. and Disney Junior, PBS carries a similar lineup called PBS Kids, while broadcast networks carry syndicated content; some air older programs (such as reruns of classic cartoons such as Looney Tunes and Tom and Jerry on Cartoon Network) at midday while children are at school, while programs for older school-age children and high school-aged teenagers air in the late afternoon slot. During prime time, programs that are generally aimed at the entire family (such as movies, which Disney Channel often airs) are common. Cartoon Network switches from children's programming content later in the evening to carry adult-oriented live-action/animation block Adult Swim, which runs through late night.

==== Daytime ====
On television, like on radio, the day is divided into similar dayparts, although the times have been blurred somewhat. In general, breakfast television programs air between 7:00 and 10:00 a.m.; on television network, these are usually long-form news programs featuring entertainment, light fare and features aimed toward women. Until the 1970s or so, children's programs such as Captain Kangaroo aired in this time slot (since that time, however, the school day has started earlier, making such programs less viable).

After breakfast comes daytime television, which targets college students, older retirees and the ever-shrinking base of stay-at-home moms and housewives; the soap opera, tabloid talk show, court show and (much more rarely since the 1990s) the game show are popular genres in this daypart. In the United States and Canada, a local midday news broadcasting also airs during the noon hour on most stations as well (this is not always the case; some stations may schedule their midday newscasts up to one hour earlier). PBS and other noncommercial public broadcasting networks generally broadcast educational programs aimed at children, especially toddlers and preschool children (such as Sesame Street) throughout the early and later part of the daytime slot, while some show other alternative programs such as cooking programs during the midday period. Cable and satellite television networks generally broadcast an occasional movie during the daytime slot or acquired programs during prime time.

The later part of the daytime slot can sometimes be targeted at children ages 7–12 and teenagers ages 13–16 when they come home from school. The U.S. networks Fox and The WB had children's program blocks during the mid-1990s into the early 2000s, and even prior to that, CBS's Match Game exploited this audience to set ratings records in the 1970s. PBS traditionally broadcasts educational children's programs until approximately 5:00 p.m. in most areas, some PBS stations broadcast children's programs until 6:00 p.m., and some even until 7:00 p.m..

From 5:00 to 7:00 p.m. (in the United States, this can sometimes be as early as 4:00 p.m.), newscasts are usually shown on most television stations. Local news is usually coupled with a half-hour network newscast and possibly a syndicated news program. Unlike morning news shows, these are more generally targeted programs and feature more hard news stories (network evening newscasts, unlike their local counterparts, tend to limit weather and sports coverage unless it is a notable news story). In the United States, stations affiliated with minor networks, or those that have no network affiliation at all, usually air syndicated sitcom reruns or continue daytime programming during this daypart.

Following the news, prime time begins with what is usually referred to as the "fringe time" or "access period" (which was named after the Prime Time Access Rule, former legislation in the United States which previously required networks to not show network-supplied programming in that hour). In the United States (and Canada, to a certain extent), two game shows, Wheel of Fortune and Jeopardy! have dominated this time slot since the 1980s, and they usually compete with syndicated entertainment newspaper magazines (such as Entertainment Tonight) and syndicated reruns of popular primetime programming like Seinfeld and Friends. Additional local newscasts have become increasingly popular in this time slot.

==== Evening ====
Prime time is the highest-profile television daypart, from 7:00 or 8:00 p.m. to 10:00 or 11:00 p.m., depending on the network and time zone. The highest rated programs on television often air during prime time, and almost all scripted programming (except soap operas, game shows, and more recently, sketch comedy shows) air during the prime time slots. Occasionally, especially during the 1980s and in the 2000s, programs that were "daytime oriented" sometimes enter the prime time daypart, such as the popular nighttime soap opera Dallas and the game show Who Wants to Be a Millionaire. Usually the main reason for the high profile of prime time television is due to the fact that many people who come home from work and school tend to watch television rather than engage in any other activity.

In North America, Friday nights are often considered to be the "Friday night death slot", due to the concept that many shows scheduled on or moved to Friday nights would not last long before cancellation due to low ratings. Some shows have achieved success on Fridays even with the notion of the "death slot" (examples include CBS's Hawaii Five-0, Blue Bloods and MacGyver, programs within the now-defunct TGIF lineup, and more recently Shark Tank, both aired on ABC in the U.S.). Other "death slots" include Saturday nights, the 12:00 noon and 4:00 p.m. weekday time slots (at least during the 1980s; both time slots have since been abandoned by all networks and given to local news or syndication), and the time slot or slots immediately opposite popular shows such as American Idol or the Super Bowl (see also Super Bowl counterprogramming). The phenomenon of fewer viewers on Friday and Saturday is in part because most people (particularly the younger viewers that advertisers often seek) are usually not home to watch television on Friday and Saturday nights as they participate in leisure activities on those days, and as a result, programs that air during this time usually receive low ratings. However, some cable channels aimed at children, teenagers or preadolescence audiences (such as Nickelodeon, Cartoon Network and Disney Channel) have experienced success with original programs that they commonly air in the perceived Friday and Saturday night death slots; Nickelodeon in particular, has aired first-run teen programs during Saturday prime time since 1992 with the creation of the SNICK block (later renamed TeenNick from 2004 to 2009), as well as ABC's "TGIF" block from the 1980s and '90s.

Following prime time, late-local news often air, followed by late night television programs. Late-night shows are predominantly targeted toward younger male audiences (college students and people who suffer from insomnia are also a large audience for late night programs) and feature a common format of a male host delivering a stand-up comedy routine (known as a monologue) centered around current events, followed by several guests and a house band's performance.

==== Overnight ====
After the late night shows, programming varies; this time slot between approximately 2:00 and 6:00 a.m. is known as overnight (or the "graveyard slot" due to the extremely low numbers of viewers). This daypart is the only portion of the day not monitored or reported on by Nielsen in the U.S. in most circumstances, although many stations still consider this a viable programming daypart and actively sell breaks. Some stations may sign-on and sign-off for the night (though this has become less common since the 1980s), air infomercial, or air news or reruns of other programming. It is also often used as a timeslot to "burn off" (air programming the station is required to run) shows the station is contractually obligated to run but is not concerned with viewership, often after an announced cancellation or poor ratings performance. This daypart can also be used to air programming intended to be recorded via DVR and watched later ("time shifting"), or a spot to air programming preempted from another daypart due to breaking news, live sports, or other program interruptions. Many stations run rebroadcasts of local late news broadcasts at 2:00 a.m., with visual disclaimers that indicate the programming is pre-recorded, with additional updated live segments for weather (hurricane or winter storm updates), breaking news, live sports scores (late games and on occasion an early game going long), or an updated highlights package of a local team's games not finished during the original broadcast (for example, a market with East Coast based team plays a team in the Pacific Time Zone with a 10:30 p.m. start with the game ending around 1:30 a.m.). In many areas, PBS member stations may also air encores of children's programs on a digital subchannel at this time.

In some countries, programming aimed at adult audiences may also air during the late night hours, such as softcore pornography. In the United States, a handful of cable television channels such as Cinemax and AXS TV have used this practice, but this is forbidden on American broadcast television. An exception to this is if the broadcast signal is encrypted; this allowed pay television that transmitted over broadcast television in the 1970s and 1980s such as ONTV to air pornographic films at night. Until the end of the 1990s (for example BBC One by November 1997) most TV stations around the world would sign-off between around midnight and 3am local time, and showed a test card until the sign-on in the morning. Most often at the main public stations (like BBC1 in Britain) showed the national anthem before closing down.

==== Weekends ====
Weekends have a slightly different setup than weekdays. On Saturdays, morning shows share time with the saturday-morning cartoon, where the networks usually fulfill federally mandated regulations requiring the airing of educational or children's shows (such as regulations on children's television programming in the United States, where at least three hours of this programming must air weekly across all television stations; although most of the children's programs have increasingly become more live action in nature than animated). Sunday mornings, often known as a graveyard slot (particularly very early on Sunday morning) feature more morning shows, public affairs designed for very small audiences, additional infomercials, religious broadcasting, and a series of influential political and news analysis/interview programs known as the Sunday morning talk show.

Weekend afternoons (both Saturday and Sunday) often feature different sporting events to varying degrees. During the fall, ABC, CBS, Fox, and NBC in the United States all broadcast football (all four networks air college football and NFL football), the NBA airs on ABC, college basketball airs on CBS, Fox and ABC during the winter and spring, while the NHL airs on ABC during this time period. Golf (on NBC And CBS), auto racing (NBC and Fox for NASCAR, though NBC sometimes airs IndyCar racing) and baseball (Fox) occur during the summer; in addition, sports anthology series such as the CBS Sports Spectacular, Canada's CBC Sports Saturday and ABC's Wide World of Sports broadcast a broad variety of sports with a smaller following. Most stations also find time when sports are not airing to air large blocks of infomercials and some syndicated programs during this time slot. Cable networks and some broadcast stations frequently air feature films during weekend afternoons.

In North America, not many new programs air on Saturday nights, with the focus more on movies, reruns and sports. This is largely due to the increasing status of Saturday prime time as a "death slot", which led most American broadcast networks to abandon first-run scripted fare on that night by the mid-2000s. In Canada, CBC Television has historically aired Saturday night NHL ice hockey nationally under the title Hockey Night in Canada, dating back to the early days of radio. Other Canadian networks use the Saturday night slot to meet Canadian content quotas (a practice colloquially known as the "Canadian content"). The U.S.-based Fox network established a permanent sports block on Saturday night in 2012, carrying a range of sports including Pac-12 Conference Fox College Football, Major League Baseball on Fox, NASCAR on Fox and the Fox UFC on a periodic basis with reruns airing when sports events are not scheduled (this block displaced Fox's reality series Cops from its time slot of over two decades); ABC carries Saturday Night Football during the fall, then switches to a mix of NBA on ABC, movies, news magazines and prime time reruns for the rest of the year.

In the U.S., late night programming on Saturday features one prominent sketch comedy show, NBC's Saturday Night Live, while other stations carry syndicated reruns. Sunday evening is generally treated as a regular weeknight, with popular prime time programs airing. In the United States and Canada, prime time network programs start one hour earlier on Sunday evenings (6:00 or 7:00 p.m., depending on the time zone) than on Monday through Saturdays, an exception to the since-repealed Prime Time Access Rule as part of a 1975 revision that allowed networks to program the time slot on Sundays. No network programming currently airs in the Sunday late night slot.

== United Kingdom ==
Weekdays on the major British channels generally consist of breakfast programming (on BBC One, ITV and Channel 5) or comedy programmes (on Channel 4), followed by game shows, soap operas and lifestyle programmes during the day. Channel 4 has also had consistent success with late-afternoon game shows; Countdown, airing daily since the network's launch, has been one of the network's most popular programmes.

In the UK, Saturday night prime time is usually devoted to entertainment programming such as reality talent shows such as The X Factor or Britain's Got Talent on ITV and Strictly Come Dancing on the BBC or drama programmes such as Doctor Who on the BBC. Unlike other regions, such as the United States and Canada, some programmes aired during Saturday primetime in the UK achieve strong viewership levels. ITV and BBC both have long-running traditions of broadcasting a flagship television show on Sunday evenings. Examples include Downton Abbey, Victoria and Poldark. In recent years, long-running classic dramas have been increasingly broadcast during primetime, often more than 1 time per week. Primetime generally starts and finishes earlier (6pm to 10pm starting times). Primetime's two main slots are the 8pm and 9pm shows, whilst 7pm and 6pm shows are often popular shows and 10pm showings being for shows of a more adult nature, though not necessarily explicit. Adult shows such as explicit and horror programmes are usually shown on second channels (ITV2 and BBC Two) as soon as Ofcom allows, rather than in the small hours like in some countries. There are also many channels largely dedicated to replaying now-axed popular shows from the past, such as Agatha Christie's Poirot, The Bill, London's Burning and 'classic' EastEnders.

== Australia ==
In Australia, dayparting is not as complex. The breakfast television slot is generally seen as 6:00 to 9:00 a.m., although two of the three major networks have begun morning news programmes at 5:00 a.m. since 2010. Morning television follows which often involves a 'light news/talk' show, sometimes featuring an advertorial. The daytime television slot adjoins the morning slot, lasting from 11:00 a.m. to 4:00 p.m., Various repeated shows and movies are often aired, along with imported programs such as The Bold and the Beautiful.

The early fringe occurs in the late afternoon/early evening, from 4:00 to 7:30 p.m., with children's programming having been shown in the early part of the time period until 2012, as well as afternoon and evening news and public affairs shows at 4:00, 5:00, 6:00 and 6:30 p.m., depending on the channel. Locally produced game shows such as The Chase Australia and Millionaire Hot Seat air at 5:00 p.m. across two channels. At 7:00 p.m., one channel airs public affairs Program A Current Affair, while another airs an Australian soap, Home and Away, and the third airs a light news/talk show.

Primetime is officially, in terms of ratings figure designations, from 6:00 p.m. until midnight, however the peak audiences are between 6:00 and 10:30 p.m. Primetime programming is advertised as starting from 7:30 p.m., with more family-friendly programs airing during this time, until classification restrictions allow for racier content from 8:30 p.m. There is a small audience drop off at 9:30 p.m., and a significant audience drop off after 10:30 p.m., with not much promotion given to programmes airing after this time. Late local news programmes only air on one of the three networks. As a result, the late fringe occurs from 10:30 p.m. to around 12:30 a.m., depending on the programme which precedes it.

Overnight occurs anywhere from midnight to 5:00 a.m., and features mostly reruns, home shopping advertorials and religious programs. From around 4:00 a.m. until local news resumes, the three networks air the three U.S. breakfast shows (Today, Good Morning America and CBS This Morning) in a condensed format with continuity meant for American local television stations removed (the U.S. Today show is retitled NBC Today in Australia, to avoid confusion with the Today, which airs on a different network than the U.S. show).

=== Daily variations ===
There are some variations to dayparting based on the day. The highest ratings are achieved in primetime on Sunday to Thursday, although the early fringe holds lifestyle shows before the news instead of game shows. Friday and Saturday primetime, much like the U.S., has lower audience numbers due to the fact that younger audiences are not at home watching television, though this varies depending on the country. Friday nights feature live Australian Football League (AFL) and National Rugby League (NRL) matches, as well as less popular series or movies, although lifestyle series Better Homes and Gardens has pulled in high ratings on Friday nights, airing before live sport events. Saturday nights are dedicated to either family movies or programming for older audiences, such as movies or series such as Heartbeat or A Touch of Frost; AFL also airs on Saturday nights.

Friday and Saturday nights are almost the only times when programming differs between states, due to the differing popularity of sports interstate. AFL is only broadcast live in Victoria, South Australia, Western Australia, and Tasmania, while the NRL is only shown in the other states (Queensland, Northern Territory, New South Wales and Australian Capital Territory) live.

Weekend daytime is also very different; with the exception of sport and weekend breakfast programs, there are no regular programs.

== Timetable ==
Dayparts		US	UK	AUS	NZ	MY (Note: Malaysia)	TH
Breakfast		6:00 AM – 10:00 AM	6:00 AM – 9:00 AM	6:00 AM – 9:00 AM	6:00 AM – 9:00 AM	7:00 AM – 11:00 AM	6:00 AM - 10:00 AM
Daytime
Daytime	Late morning	10:00 AM – 5:00 PM	9:00 AM – 5:30 PM	9:00 AM – 12:00 PM	9:00 AM – 12:00 PM	11:00 AM – 8:00 PM	10:00 AM-11:00 AM
Daytime	Afternoon	10:00 AM – 5:00 PM	9:00 AM – 5:30 PM	12:00 PM – 6:00 PM	12:00 PM – 5:00 PM	11:00 AM – 8:00 PM	11:00 AM - 6:00 PM
National Prime Time
National Prime Time	Early fringe	5:00 PM – 8:00 PM	5:30 PM – 8:00 PM	6:00 PM – 7:00 PM	5:00 PM – 7:30 PM	8:00 PM – 9:00 PM	6:00 PM - 8:00 PM
National Prime Time	Late fringe	8:00 PM – 11:00 PM	8:00 PM – 11:00 PM	7:00 PM – 12:00 AM	7:30 PM – 10:30 PM	9:00 PM – 12:00 AM	8:00 PM - 11:00 PM
Late night		11:00 PM – 2:00 AM	11:00 PM – 12:30 AM	12:00 AM – 1:00 AM	10:30 PM – 1:00 AM	12:00 AM – 3:00 AM	11:00 PM - 3:00 AM
Overnight		2:00 AM – 6:00 AM	12:30 AM – 6:00 AM	1:00 AM – 6:00 AM	1:00 AM – 6:00 AM	3:00 AM – 7:00 AM	3:00 AM - 6:00 AM

== See also ==
- Director of network programming
- Rush hour (disambiguation)
