= Christopher Lawrence (DJ) =

American DJ and producer

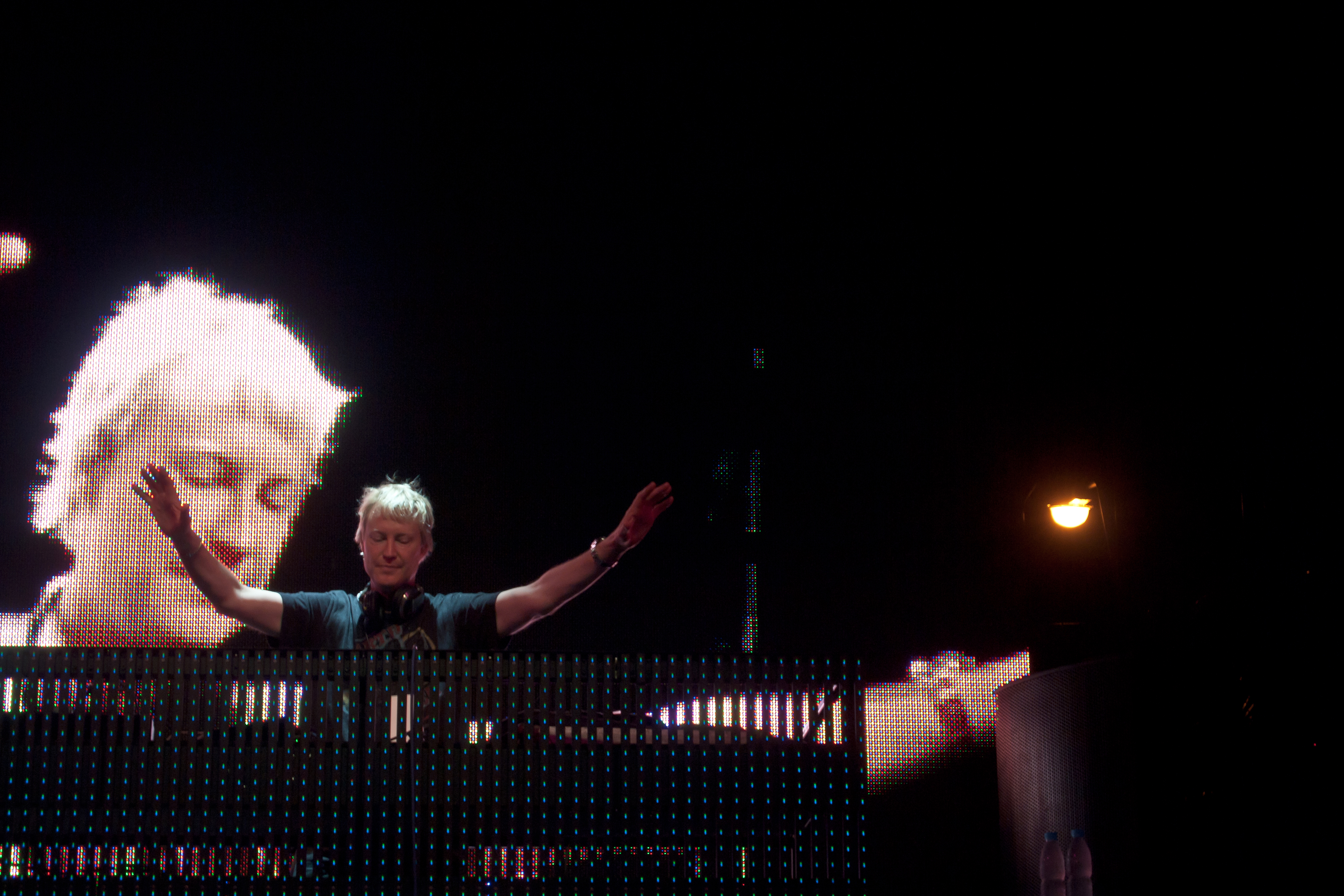

Background information
- Origin: United States
- Genres: Trance; electronica; progressive trance
- Occupations: DJ and record producer
- Years active: 1996–present
- Label: Pharmacy Music
- Website: www.christopherlawrence.com

Christopher Lawrence is an American DJ and producer, specializing in progressive trance music. He has released 10 mix CDs since 1997. He is the second highest American charting artist on DJ Mags prestigious top 100 DJs poll.

== Awards ==
- Voted the #4 DJ in the world by DJ Magazine's prestigious ‘Top 100’ poll for 2006
  - Excluded from 2007 voting when it was alleged that Christopher had been involved in cheating but DJ Mag later cleared him of any involvement.
- "Best DJ" award at the Dancestar US Awards

== Discography ==
=== Albums ===
- 2004 All or Nothing
- 2004 Un-Hooked: The Hook Sessions

=== Singles & EPs ===
- 1997 "Interceptor/Geoscape"
- 1997 "Navigator"
- 1998 "Shredder"
- 1999 "Renegade/Wasteland""
- 2000 "Cruise Control"
- 2000 "Rush Hour/Ride The Light"
- 2002 "Mind Eraser"
- 2002 "Nitro"
- 2002 "October's Child"
- 2003 "Warp/Acid People"
- 2004 "Primer"
- 2005 "Scorcher" (with Nicholas Bennison)
- 2005 "Attention" (with John 00 Fleming)
- 2008 "Gotham"
- 2008 "Beyond the Limit" (with John 00 Fleming)
- 2009 "Continuation" (with Nicholas Bennison)
- 2009 "Lie to Ourselves" (with Dave Audé & Jen Lasher)
- 2010 "A Little Rush" (feat. Suzie del Vecchio)
- 2011 "Tremor"
- 2011 "Rock It"
- 2012 "Faith In The Future"
- 2012 "OK To GO"
- 2013 "Beyond The Limit (2013 Mixes)"
- 2013 "Dark on Fire"
- 2013 "Libra"
- 2014 "The Dark"
- 2014 "Whatever You Dream"
- 2015 "The Whip"
- 2015 "Unbroken"

=== Remixes ===
- 1998 Pure Nova - "Awakening"
- 1999 Electroland - "Cheyenne"
- 2002 Mile High - "Night Fever"
- 2008 Enrique Iglesias - "Hero"
- 2009 U2 - "I'll Go Crazy If I Don't Go Crazy Tonight"
- 2011 LMFAO - "Party Rock Anthem"
- 2011 Lords of Acid - "Little Mighty Rabbit"
- 2012 Reaky - "Magnum Orca" (with Sean J. Morris)
- 2014 Lisa Lashes - "Virus"

=== DJ Compilations ===
- 1997 Rise
- 1999 Temptation
- 1999 Christopher Lawrence Presents:Hook Recordings
- 2000 Trilogy Part One: Empire
- 2001 United States of Trance
- 2002 Christopher Lawrence - Around The World
- 2002 Christopher Lawrence - Exposure IV
- 2006 Christopher Lawrence - Subculture 01
- 2006 Christopher Lawrence - Gatecrasher: Live in Moscow
- 2008 Unfold 2
- 2008 Global Trance Grooves Vol. 1: Two Tribes(with John 00 Fleming)
- 2010 Rush Hour
