= Prime time =

Block of television programming occurring during peak viewing time in the evening

Prime time (sometimes spelled primetime or prime), or peak time, is the block of broadcast programming taking place during the middle of the evening for television shows. It is mostly targeted towards adults (and sometimes families). It is used by the major television networks to broadcast their season's nightly programming. The term prime-time is often defined in terms of a fixed time period—for example, (in the United States) from 8:00 p.m. to 11:00 p.m. (Eastern and Pacific Time) or 7:00 p.m. to 10:00 p.m. (Central and Mountain Time). In India and some Middle Eastern countries, prime time consists of programmes that are aired on television between 8:00 p.m. and 10:00 p.m. local time.

== Asia ==
=== Bangladesh ===
In Bangladesh, the 19:00-to-22:00 time slot is known as prime time. Several national broadcasters, like Maasranga Television, Gazi TV, Channel 9, and Channel i, broadcast their prime-time shows from 20:00 to 23:00 after their primetime news at 19:00. During Islamic holidays, most of the television stations broadcast their specially-produced shows and world television premieres starting from 15:00 to midnight. During Ramadan, the broadcasters also air special religious and cooking shows from 14:00 to 20:00, affecting the primetime hours. Late-night talk shows are also aired from 01:00 to 04:00, except during Ramadan. Religious shows are also broadcast simultaneously from 01:00, along with talk shows and news analysis.

=== China ===
In television in China, the 19:00-to-22:00 time slot is known as Golden Time (Traditional Chinese: 黄金時間; Simplified Chinese: 黄金时间; Pinyin: Huángjīn shíjiān). The term also influenced a nickname of a strip of holidays, known as Golden Week.

==== Hong Kong and Macau ====
Prime time usually takes place from 19:00 until 22:00. After that, programs classified as "PG" (Parental Guidance) are allowed to be broadcast. Frontline dramas appear during this time slot in Cantonese, as well as movies in English.

=== India ===
In India, prime time occurs between 20:00 and 23:30. Usually, programmes during prime time are domestic dramas, talent shows and reality shows.

=== Indonesia ===
Prime time usually takes place from 17:00 to 0:00 in Indonesian time zones, and sinetrons (soap operas) dominate majority of the programming schedules. Before 2018, daily evening newscasts would kick off primetime between 17:00 and 18:00, although some channels, notably SCTV, broadcast their daily evening newscasts earlier, usually at 16:00 or 16:30. The practice of airing news at primetime ended in 2018 in favor of adding more sinetrons to the schedule, except for TVRI, which have kept their newscasts, Klik Indonesia Petang (at 18:00) on primetime respectively. After prime time, programs classified as Adult, as well as Adult products (generally cigarettes) commercials, may be aired.

Like other Muslim-majority nations, there is also a "midnight prime time" during suhur while the month of Ramadan is commencing. It takes place from 02:00 (or 02:30 in some channels) and ends at the Fajr prayer call, which varies in timing between 04:30 and 05:00. The time slot is usually filled with entertainment and religious programming.

=== Iraq ===
In Iraq, prime time runs from 20:00 to 23:00. The main news programs are broadcast at 20:00, and the highest-rated television program airs at 21:00.

=== Japan ===
In Japanese television, prime time runs from 19:00 to 23:00. Especially, the 19:00-to-22:00 time slot is also known as Golden Time (ゴールデン・タイム, gōruden taimu; or just Golden). The term also influenced a nickname of a strip of holidays in Japan known as Golden Week.

=== Malaysia ===
Malaysia's prime time starts with the main news from 20:00 to 20:30 (now 20:00 to 21:00) and ends either at 23:00 or 1:00, or possibly later. Usually, programmes during prime time are domestic dramas, foreign drama series (mostly American), films, and entertainment programmes. Programmes classified as 18 are not allowed to be broadcast before 10:00 p.m., but on Radio Televisyen Malaysia, most programmes on this slot are rated U (U means Umum in Malay and literally General Viewing or General Audiences in English) throughout the whole day. However, programmes broadcast after 23:00 are still considered prime time. As of 2019, NTV7's prime time continues until 12:00 a.m. Programmes during prime time may have longer commercial breaks due to the number of viewers.

Some domestic prime-time productions may be affected because of certain major sporting events such as FIFA World Cup. However, only FIFA World Cup held in the Americas do not affect the domestic prime-time programmes but only during daytime.

=== Pakistan ===
In Pakistan, prime time is from 19:00 to 00:00 Pakistan Standard Time. During this time, the majority of the local channels broadcast their most popular shows. However, state channels broadcast Khabarnama (New Bulletin) from past many decades.

Like other Muslim-majority nations, during Ramadan, the broadcasters also air special religious and cooking shows starting from 14:00 to 19:00/19:30 with "Ramadan" special programs airing from 19:30/20:00 to 21:30/22:00 affecting the primetime hours for some channels. There is also a "midnight prime time" during suhur while the month of Ramadan is commencing. It takes place from 02:00 (or 01:45 in some channels) and ends at the Fajr prayer call, which varies in timing between 04:30 and 05:00. Also, during other Islamic events such as Muharram and Rabi' al-Awwal, some channels broadcast religious shows during day/evening time slots (between 12:00 and 19:00—time varies on channel) or late-night slot (from 22:00).

=== Singapore ===
In Singapore, prime time begins at 18:00 on Channel 5, 18:30 on Channel 8 and 19:00 on Channel U, CNA, Suria, Vasantham. which are also the main (Free-to-air) television channels in Singapore.

On Channel 8, prime time ends at midnight or 0:15 on weekdays, at 0:30 on Saturday nights, and at 23:30 on Sunday nights. On Channel 5, prime time ends at 0:00 on weekdays, at 1:30 (or later) on Saturday nights, and at 0:30 on Sunday nights. On Suria, prime time ends at 22:30 on Monday to Thursday nights, 23:30 on Friday nights, 23:00 on weekends, and at 00:30 or 01:00 on eve and actual days of public holidays. On Vasantham, prime time ends at 23:00 on Mondays to Thursdays, midnight (or later) on Friday and Saturday nights, and at 23:30 on Sunday nights. On Channel NewsAsia, prime time ends at 23:01, immediately after the news headlines, seven days a week; on Channel U, prime time ends at 23:00 seven days a week. Generally, however, prime time is considered to be from 18:00 to 00:00.

=== South Korea ===
In South Korea, prime time usually runs from 19:30 to 23:00 during weekdays, while on Saturdays and Sundays, it runs from 18:00 to 23:00. Family-oriented television shows are broadcast before 22:00, and adult-oriented television shows air after 22:00.

=== Taiwan ===
In Taiwan, prime time (called bādiǎn dàng—八點檔—in Mandarin Chinese, literally eight o'clock slot) starts at 8 p.m.. Taiwanese drama series played then are called 8 o'clock series and are expected to have high viewer ratings. Also, the evening news usually start from 18:00 or 19:00.

=== Thailand ===
In Thailand, prime time dramas (ละคร; lakhon) air from 20:30 to 22:30. Most dramas are soap operas. Prime time dramas are popular and influential to Thai society. Some channels opted to air news instead or airs news after prime time dramas.

=== Vietnam ===
In Vietnam, prime time is also known as Golden Time (Vietnamese: Giờ vàng). Prime time starts at 18:00 in the evening and ends at 22:00.

== Europe ==
Hours of start or end for peak times in selected European countries

=== Austria ===
In Austria, prime time usually starts at 20:15 after the news broadcast of ORF 1. Even though ORF2 has its news from 19:30 to 20:00, they also start broadcasting prime time content at 20:15. The same applies for nearly all channels seated in Austria or Germany that are broadcast in Austria.

=== Bosnia and Herzegovina ===
In Bosnia and Herzegovina, prime time starts at 20:00 and finishes at 22:00. It is preceded by a daily newscast (Dnevnik) at 19:00 and followed by a late night newscast (Vijesti) at 22:00.

=== Bulgaria ===
In Bulgaria, prime time starts at 20:00 every day (including weekends). Usually, the programmes aired are Bulgarian or Turkish series and reality shows, followed by a late newscast. The Bulgarian National Television broadcasts Po Sveta i u Nas at 20:00 and shows cultural and political programmes from 21:00 to 22:00, with series and late-night news following at 23:00.

=== Croatia ===
In Croatia, prime time starts between 20:00 and 20:15. Croatian public broadcaster Hrvatska radiotelevizija broadcasts a daily newscast from 19:00 to 20:00. Also, many private broadcasters have daily newscasts either before or after the HTY newscast, at around 20.05, followed by the start of their own prime time. Many broadcasters without daily newscasts start their prime time at 20:00. Prime time generally ends between 22:00 and 23:00, followed by the late night edition of the network newscast and adult-oriented programming.

=== Denmark ===
In Denmark, prime time starts at 20:00.

=== Finland ===
In Finland, prime time starts at 21:00. It is preceded by a daily newscast at 20:30.

=== France ===
In France prime time starts at 21:10 (20:35 in the 1980s, 20:50 in the 1990s and 2000s, 21:05 in the 2010s).

=== Georgia ===
In Georgia, prime time starts between 18:45 and 20:00 and generally ends at midnight. However, on Friday night / Saturday morning, prime time usually continues until 1:00.

=== Germany ===
At 20:00 each evening, Das Erste (The First), Germany's oldest public television network, airs the country's most-watched news broadcast, the main edition of the Tagesschau, which is also simulcast on most of its other specialist and regional channels (The Third). The conclusion of the bulletin 15 minutes later marks the beginning of prime time, as it has since the 1950s. In consequence, most other channels—public and private alike—also choose to start their prime time at 20:15. In the 1990s, the commercial channel Sat.1 suffered a significant loss of audience share when it tried moving the start of its prime time to 20:00.

=== Greece ===
In Greece, prime time runs from 21:00 (usually following the news) to midnight.

=== Hungary ===
In Hungary, prime time on weekdays on the two big commercial stations (RTL and TV2) starts at 19:00 with game shows, tabloid, and docu-reality programmes. At 21:00, two popular soap operas air: Barátok közt and Jóban Rosszban, which follows at 21:30. American and other series, movies, talk-shows, and magazines run until 23:30. The prime-time lineup is preceded by daily news programmes at 18:30. At weekends, prime time begins at 19:00, with blockbuster movies and television shows.

Before 15 March 2015, the public television station M1 began its prime time with a game show at 18:30, which was followed by the daily news programme Híradó at 19:30. After the news, the channel broadcast American and other series, talk shows, magazines, and news programmes until 22:00, after which came the daily news magazine Este and the late edition of Híradó.

From 15 March 2015, Duna began broadcasting all of the entertainment programming transferred to it from that date from M1, meaning that prime time on Duna now begins at 18:00, starting with the simulcast of the 18:00 edition of Híradó from the newly re-launched news channel, M1.

=== Iceland ===
In Iceland, prime time starts at 19:30. It is preceded by a daily newscast at 19:00.

=== Ireland ===
In Ireland, prime starts at 18:30 and ends at 22:00.

=== Italy ===
In Italy, prime time (called "prima serata") starts between 21:00 and 21:45 (main channels, including Rai TV) and ends between 23:30 and 00:55. On Friday and Saturday night, some shows last until 01:00–01:30. It usually follows news and, on some networks (like Rai 1 and Canale 5), a slot called "access prime time". Shows, movies and fiction are usually shown during prime time although sporting events, Festival di Sanremo, Eurovision Song Contest and special programs usually start between 20:45 and 21:00 and partially cover both time slots.

=== Netherlands ===
Much like in Germany, prime time in the Netherlands usually begins at 20:30 in order to not compete with Nederlandse Omroep Stichting's flagship 20:00 newscast.

=== Norway ===
In Norway, prime time starts at 19:45. On the NRK1 channel it is preceded by the daily newscast Dagsrevyen at 19:00. Locally, prime time is called beste sendetid (lit. 'best time for broadcasting').

=== Poland ===
In Poland, prime time starts around 20:00 (sometimes 20:30). On TVP1, it is preceded by a daily newscast at 19:30. On TVN, the newscast is aired at 19:00, followed by the newsmagazine Uwaga at 19:50 (weekdays) or 19:45 (weekends), and then the soap opera Na Wspólnej at 20:05 (Monday to Thursday) or 20:00 (Friday to Sunday), various movies on Fridays, serials or films (winter and summer) on Saturdays, and programmes or films (winter and summer) on Sundays. On Polsat, the news is aired at 18:50, followed by Gość Wydarzeń talk-show at 19:15, sports news and weather forecast.

=== Portugal ===
Much like in Spain, prime time in Portugal usually begins later at 21:30 and ends at 0:00 in order to not compete with Rádio e Televisão de Portugal's flagship 20:00 newscast. Similarly, Portugal also has a second prime time, running from 13:30–16:00 which coincides with the extended Portuguese lunch break.

=== Russia ===
In Russia television prime time is between 19:00 and 23:00 on working days and from 15:00 to 01:00 on holidays. On radio stations there are morning, day and evening prime times. The most common division: morning—6:30 to 10:00; day—~12:00 to 14:00; evening—16:00 to 21:00.

=== Slovakia ===
Public television in Slovakia consists of two channels; on the main channel (Jednotka) prime time starts at 20:10, and on the second one (Dvojka) prime-time programming starts at 20:00. The two biggest private broadcasters set the start of prime-time programming at 20:20 (Markíza) and 20:30 (TV JOJ). Generally, however, prime time is considered to be from 20:00 to 23:00.

=== Slovenia ===
In Slovenia, prime time, the period in which the most-watched shows are broadcast, is from 8:00 pm to 11:00 pm. It is preceded by daily newscasts; Dnevnik RTV SLO (7:00 pm – 8:00 pm) on TV SLO 1, 24ur (6:55 pm – 8:00 pm) on POP TV, Svet na Kanalu A (6:00 pm – 7:00 pm; 7:50 pm–8:0pm), and Planet 18 (6:00 pm – 6:50 pm (monday to friday); 6:00 pm – 6:20 pm (saturday and sunday)) on Planet TV.

=== Spain ===
In Spain, prime time refers to the time period in which the most-watched shows are broadcast. Prime time in Spain starts quite late when compared to most nations as it runs from 22:30 till 01:00. Most news programmes in Spain air at 21:00 for an hour and prime time follows. However, due to fierce competition, especially among the private stations prime time has even been delayed until 23:00. Most channels are delaying prime time in order to protect their top shows from sporting events.

In the 1990s, prime time in Spain began at 21:00, moving to 21:30 in the latter half of the 1990s and 22:00 in the early 2000s. Commercial broadcaster LaSexta and the second channel from the Public broadcasting La 2 have attempted to shift prime time back to 21:30 in 2006 and Spring 2007, but these attempts have been unsuccessful. Fellow public channel La 1 also tried to pull prime time back to 21:00 in early 2015, to no avail.

The lateness in the start of prime time in Spain is also due to Spanish culture. Spanish people generally work from 09:00–14:00 and then from 17:00–20:00 as opposed to the 09:00–17:00 which is common in other countries. The popular late-night show Crónicas marcianas during the late 1990s–2000 also helped to extend prime time well into the early hours with the show being watched by a share of 40%, despite finishing at 02:00.

Spain might also be unique in that it has a second prime time, running from 14:30–17:00 which coincides with the extended Spanish lunch break. Shows airing in the secondary prime time period on many occasions beat those prime-time shows at night on a daily basis. The second prime time occurs only on weekdays, though and the slot is usually filled with The Simpsons, news, soap operas and talk shows.

=== Sweden ===
In Sweden, prime time starts at 20:00. It is preceded by a daily newscast at 19:30 and local news at 19:50.

=== Ukraine ===
In Ukraine, prime time (Ukrainian: прайм-тайм, найкращий час) runs from 18:30 to 21:30 on working days and from 15:00 to 01:00 on holidays.

=== United Kingdom ===
In the UK, prime time (also known as peak time) runs from 19:00 to 23:00.

== North America ==
U.S. TV dayparting; prime time is in light purple

In North America, television networks feed their prime-time programming in two blocks: one for the Eastern and Central time zones, and the other, on a three-hour tape delay, for the Pacific Time Zone, to their local network affiliates. In Atlantic Canada (including Newfoundland and Labrador), as well as Alaska and Hawaii, there is no change in the interpretation or usage of "prime time", as the concept is not attached to time zones in any way. Affiliates in the Mountain, Alaskan, and Hawaiian zones are either on their own to delay broadcast by an hour or two, or collectively form a small, regional network feed with others in the same time zone.

Prime time is commonly defined as 8:00–11:00 p.m. Eastern/Pacific and 7:00–10:00 p.m. Central/Mountain on Monday through Saturday. On Sundays, the five major broadcast television networks traditionally begin their primetime programming one hour early at 7:00 p.m. (Eastern/Pacific, 6:00 p.m. Central/Mountain), and still air through 11:00 p.m. Eastern and Pacific /10:00 p.m. Central. Some networks, such as Fox and The CW only broadcast a time period from 7:00–10:00 p.m. on Sundays and 8:00–10:00 p.m. on other days, a time period known as "Common Prime".

MyNetworkTV takes it a step further and broadcast only from 8:00–10:00 p.m. and only on weekdays (due to it not being a TV network and instead as a programming service, forming its programming like a TV block).

The CW returned to Sunday broadcasting in 2019, followed by the addition of Saturday in 2021 and then the Sunday prime access hour in 2023. In Canada, CTV and Global both follow the same model as the larger American networks (although both may occasionally air programming in the 7:00 p.m. hour in the event of scheduling conflicts with other U.S. imports), while CBC Television, Citytv, and CTV 2 schedule prime-time programs only within the common prime period (with the 10:00 p.m. hour dedicated to syndicated programming on Citytv and CTV 2, and CBC airing its news program The National). The Canadian Radio-television and Telecommunications Commission (CRTC) has alternatively defined prime time as ranging from 6 pm to 11 pm to 7 pm to 11 pm.

Since the early 2000s, the major networks have come to consider Saturday prime time as a graveyard slot and have largely abandoned scheduling of new scripted programming on that night. The major networks still maintain a prime-time programming schedule on Saturdays, with a mix of live sporting events (most commonly college football in the United States and ice hockey in Canada), encores of programs aired earlier in the week, films, non-scripted reality programs, true crime programs produced by their news divisions, and, occasionally, burning off episodes of low-rated or cancelled series.

Prime time can be extended or truncated if coverage of sporting events run past their allotted end time. Since the "Heidi Game" incident in 1968, in which NBC cut away from coverage of a New York Jets/Oakland Raiders football game on the east coast in order to show a movie (and, in the process, causing viewers to miss an unexpected comeback by the Raiders to win the game), the present-day National Football League (NFL) mandates that all games be broadcast in their entirety in the markets of the teams involved. Due to this rule, game telecasts may sometimes overrun into the 7:00 p.m. ET hour. Fox previously scheduled repeats of its animated series in the 7:00 hour, allowing themselves to simply pre-empt the reruns if a game ran long. This was later replaced by a half-hour-long wrap-up show, The OT. In contrast, CBS does not, as its weekly newsmagazine 60 Minutes has traditionally aired as close to 7:00 p.m. ET as possible. Even if a game runs past that hour, CBS shows 60 Minutes in its entirety after the conclusion of coverage, and the rest of the prime-time schedule on the East Coast is shifted to compensate. For example, if game coverage were to end at 7:30 p.m., prime time would end at 11:30 p.m.

However, in the rare case where the NFL game runs excessively late (8 p.m. or later), the series scheduled to air at 10 p.m. is preempted, with the West Coast and eastern markets airing only an early afternoon game usually receiving a repeat of the 10 p.m. series instead. In an extreme case, CBS's prime time can be extended past midnight during broadcasts of the NCAA Division I men's basketball tournament. This does not necessarily apply universally; in 2001, after an XFL game went into double overtime, causing a 45-minute delay of a highly promoted episode of Saturday Night Live, NBC made a decision to cut off all future XFL broadcasts at 11:00 p.m. ET. Since the launch of NBCSN, NBC has occasionally invoked this curfew by moving sports overruns to that channel if necessary.

Until the Federal Communications Commission (FCC) regulated time slots prior to prime time with the now-defunct Prime Time Access Rule in the 1971–1972 season, networks began programming at 7:30 p.m. Eastern and Pacific/6:30 p.m. Central and Mountain on weeknights. The change helped instigate what is colloquially known as the "rural purge"—a long-term trend away from programs appealing to older and rural audiences in favor of programs catering towards younger, "urban" viewers. As a result, the prime access hour became a lucrative timeslot for syndicated programming in the years that followed, with game shows and variety shows, as well as syndicated reruns, becoming popular.

The vast majority of prime-time programming in English-speaking North America comes from the United States, with only a limited amount produced in Canada. The Canadian Radio-television and Telecommunications Commission mandates quotas for Canadian content in prime time; these quotas indicate at least half of Canadian prime-time programs must be Canadian in origin, but the majority of this is served by national and local news or localized entertainment gossip shows such as Global Television Network's Entertainment Tonight Canada and CTV Television Network's ETalk.

Likewise, the vast majority of Spanish-language programming in North America comes from Mexico. Televisa, a Mexican network, provides the majority of programming to the dominant American-based Spanish broadcaster, Univision. Univision does produce a fairly large amount of unscripted Spanish-language programming, the best-known having been the long-running variety show Sábado Gigante, hosted and created by Chilean national Don Francisco, until September 2015. Today, Univision is televising Liga MX soccer matches on Saturdays. Univision's distant second-place competitor, Telemundo, produces a much greater share of in-house content, including a long line of telenovelas.

In Quebec, the largest Francophone area of North America, French-language programming consists of originally produced programs (most of which are produced in Montreal, with a few produced in Quebec City) and a few French-language dubs of English language programs. On all of the Quebec networks, entertainment programming is scheduled only between 8 and 10 p.m., with the 10–11 p.m. hour given over to a network newscast or a nightly talk show.

=== United States ===
Prime time is the daypart (a block of a day's programming schedule) with the most viewers and is generally where television networks and local stations reap much of their advertising revenues. In recent years, television advertising expenditure in the US has been highest during prime-time drama shows.

The Nielsen ratings system is explicitly designed for the optimum measurement of audience viewership by dayparts, with prime time being of most interest. Television viewership is, in general, highest on weekday evenings, as most Americans are at work during daytime, asleep during the overnights, and out taking part in social events on weekends; thus, television has its highest audience at times when people are unlikely to be away from home.

Prime time for radio is called drive time and, in Eastern and Pacific Time, is 6–10 a.m. and 3–7 p.m. and, for Mountain and Central Time, is 5–9 a.m. and 2–6 p.m. The difference between peak radio listenership and television viewership times is due to the fact that people listen to their radios most often while driving to and from work (hence the name "drive time").

A survey by Nielsen revealed that viewers watched almost two hours' worth of TV during prime time.

=== Mexico ===
In Mexico, central time normally starts at 7:30 p.m. and periodically ends at 10:30 p.m. The main networks, such as Las Estrellas, Azteca Uno, and Imagen Televisión, broadcast telenovelas produced by themselves or productions acquired from other countries such as Turkey and Brazil, among others.

== South America ==
In many Latin American countries, prime time (known in most countries as horario central or "Central Time", horario estelar ("Stellar Time") or horário nobre ("noble time") in Brazil) is considered to be from Monday to Friday from 6:00 or 7:00 p.m. to 10:00 or 11:00 p.m. The time slot is usually used for news, telenovelas and television shows, and special time slots are used for reality television, with great popularity, especially in Mexico and Brazil. In Brazil, the three most famous telenovelas in the country are shown each weekday and on Saturdays on prime time. There are also news programs, reality shows, and sitcoms.

=== Argentina ===
In Argentina, prime time is considered to be from 8:00 p.m. until 12:00 a.m., including the most successful series and telenovelas in the country (such as Los Roldán and Valientes) and entertainment shows, like CQC (Caiga Quien Caiga) or Showmatch (Showmatch).

=== Chile ===
In Chile, prime time is considered to be from 10:30 p.m. until 1:00 a.m., including the most successful series and telenovelas in the country (such as Socias and Las Vega's). Investigation entertainment shows (like Informe Especial, Contacto, and Apuesto por ti) also air.

=== Colombia ===
In Colombia, prime time occurs between 20:00 and 23:00. Usually, programmes during prime time are newscasts, Soap dramas, TV Series, TV Shows, Reality Shows, and entertainment shows.

=== Paraguay ===
In Paraguay, prime time occurs between 19:00 and 23:00. Usually, programmes during prime time are newscasts and entertainment shows.

== Oceania ==
=== Australia ===
Prime time in Australia is officially from 6:00 p.m. to midnight, following Australian Eastern Standard Time, with the highest ratings normally achieved between 6:00 p.m. and 9:00 p.m.

=== New Zealand ===
Traditionally, prime time in New Zealand is considered to be 7:30 pm to 10:30 pm, but it can be extended to cover the entire evening of television (5:00 pm to 11:00 pm).

== See also ==
- Drive time
- International broadcasting
- Late night television
- Market share
- Graveyard slot
- The Complete Directory to Prime Time Network and Cable TV Shows 1946–Present
- List of longest-running American primetime television series

Preceded by Daytime television	Television dayparts 7:00 PM – 11:00 PM	Succeeded by Late night television
