= Rush Hour (band) =

American rock band

- Origin: Chicago, Illinois
- Genres: Jazz fusion, Rock
- Years active: 1980s–1997
- Labels: Gaia Records, Fahrenheit Records
- Past members: Lawrence "Larry" Imbordino (deceased); Tim Gaw; Jim Massoth; Dan Del Negro; Pete Lerner

Rush Hour was a jazz fusion and rock band from Chicago, Illinois that was active in the 1980s and 1990s, and featured members Lawrence "Larry" Imbordino, Tim Gaw, Jim Massoth, Dan Del Negro and Pete Lerner. The band released two albums; their debut album Bumper to Bumper was released under the Gaia Records label in 1988, while their second and final album Autobahn was released under the Fahrenheit Records label in 1995.

== Music career ==
Lawrence "Larry" Imbordino was born in 1957, and lived in West Chicago, Illinois; he played the drums. Imbordino started his music career in the early 1980s as a member of the Jack Hammond Group, featuring guitarist Jack Hammond; Hammond released two albums that were not on label, Open the Doors (1980), and A Fatal Beauty (1982).

In the 1980s, Imbordino formed the jazz fusion and rock band Rush Hour, as a drummer and band leader; the band also featured bassist Tim Gaw, saxophonist Jim Massoth, keyboardist Dan Del Negro, and guitarist Pete Lerner. In 1988, Rush Hour released their debut album Bumper to Bumper, under the Gaia Records label; two of the songs from the album, "If You Only Knew" and "Midway Gardens", were both featured in the Local Forecast segments on The Weather Channel during the early 1990s.

In 1993, Imbordino and Gaw both performed at a benefit Christmas concert for children with cancer, along with other musicians from West Chicago, at FitzGerald's Nightclub in Berwyn, Illinois. The group also released a tape titled The Real Christmas, which sale profits benefited families with children suffering from cancer, through a foundation called So the Children May Live; Imbordino was a cancer survivor, and also worked as a dispatcher for the Addison Fire Department in Addison, Illinois. In 1995, Rush Hour released their second and final album Autobahn, which was released under the Fahrenheit Records label. The band recorded a third album titled Picture Perfect in 1996, but it was never released.

Imbordino died on May 25, 1997, at the age of 40; he had been battling lymphoma for nine years. Imbordino was survived by his wife, Marte, and their four children. Rush Hour disbanded after Imbordino's death.

== Personnel ==
- Lawrence "Larry" Imbordino - Drums, Percussion, Band Leader
- Tim Gaw - Bass
- Jim Massoth - Saxophone, Flute (Bumper to Bumper only)
- Dan Del Negro - Keyboard, Soloist (Bumper to Bumper only)
- Pete Lerner - Guitar (Bumper to Bumper only)
- Fareed Haque - Guitar (Bumper to Bumper only)
- Vince Ashby - Guitar (Bumper to Bumper only)
- Karen Mietz - Keyboard (Bumper to Bumper only)
- Dede Sampaio - Percussion (Bumper to Bumper only)
- Steve Eisen - Baritone Saxophone (Autobahn only)
- Kraig McCreary - Electric Guitar (Autobahn only)
- Peter Saxe - Keyboards (Autobahn only)
- Steve Zoloto - Saxophone (Autobahn only)
- Mike Halpin - Trombone (Autobahn only)
- Mark Ohlsen - Trumpet (Autobahn only)

== Discography ==
Albums

- 1988: Bumper to Bumper (Gaia Records)
- 1995: Autobahn (Fahrenheit Records)
- 1996/1997: Picture Perfect (unreleased)
