= Graveyard slot =

Television term

A graveyard slot (or death slot) is a time period in which a television audience is very small compared to other times of the day, and therefore broadcast programming is considered far less important. Graveyard slots are usually situated in the early morning hours of each day, a time when most people are asleep.

With little likelihood of a substantial viewing audience during this daypart, providing useful television programming during this time is usually considered unimportant; some broadcast stations may do engineering or other technical work (e.g. software and technology upgrades) or go off the air during these hours, and some audience measurement systems do not collect measurements for these periods. Others use broadcast automation to pass through network feeds unattended, with only broadcasting authority-mandated personnel and emergency anchors/reporters present at the local station overnight. A few stations use "we're always on" or a variant to promote their 24-hour operation as a selling point, though as this is now the rule rather than the exception it was in the past, it has now mainly become a selling point for a station's website or social media apps instead.

== Programming ==
Example of U.S. TV dayparting: the beige area (2:00–6:00 am) is the overnight graveyard slot, considered significantly less important

=== Overnight slot ===
The most well-known graveyard slot in most parts of the world is the overnight slot, the daypart bridging the late night and breakfast television/early morning slots (between 2:00 and 6:00 a.m.). During this time slot, most people are either asleep or working overnight shifts (in some cases, doing so without access to a television set). Because of the small number of people awake at these times, the overnight shift was historically ignored as a revenue opportunity, although increases in irregular shifts have made overnight programming more viable than it had been in the past. In the United States, for example, research has shown that the number of televisions in use at 4:30 a.m. doubled from 1995 to 2010 (8% to 16%); this research coincided with the expansion of early morning newscasts by many local stations during this period.

==== Network overnight programming ====
The Big Three television networks in the United States all offer regular programming in the overnight slot. Both ABC and CBS carry overnight newscasts with some repackaged content from the day's previous network news broadcasts, with an emphasis on sports scores from West Coast games that typically conclude after 1:00 a.m. ET and international financial markets with the ending of the Australasian (between 12:00 and 4:00 a.m. ET depending on Daylight Savings Time), midway through the Indian (trading ends at 6:15 a.m. ET), and beginning of the European trading day (between 2:00 and 5:00 a.m. ET), while NBC (which dropped its overnight news after an eight-year run in September 1998) replays the NBC News Now streaming news program Top Story with Tom Llamas (previously occupied by a replay of the fourth hour of Today from 2011 to 2022). Each network also produces its early morning newscast at 4:00 a.m. ET (with the exception of NBC's Early Today, which since 2017, has started at 3:00 a.m. ET, acting as a de facto overnight newscast in parlance) so that it may be tape-delayed to air as a lead-in to local news.

The graveyard slots' lack of importance sometimes benefits programs; producers and program-makers can afford to take more risks, as there is less advertising revenue at stake. For example, an unusual or niche program may find a chance for an audience in a graveyard slot (a current day example is Adult Swim's FishCenter Live, which features games projected onto the video image of an aquarium), or a formerly popular program that no longer merits an important time slot may be allowed to run in a graveyard slot instead of being removed from the schedule completely. However, abusing this practice may lead to channel drift if the demoted programs were presented as channel stars at some time.

The overnight period is also noted for the prevalence of cheaply produced local advertisements which allow an advertiser to purchase time on the station for a low cost, advertisements for services of a sexual nature (such as premium-rate adult rate entertainment services, adult entertainment venues, and adult products from companies such as Adam & Eve), direct response advertising for products and services (often marketed "As Seen On TV") otherwise seen during infomercials, and public service announcements (such as those commissioned by the Ad Council) airing in these time slots due to the reduced importance of advertising revenue.

==== Time-shifted programming ====
Since the advent of home video recording, some programs in this slot may be transmitted mainly with time-shifting in mind; in the past, the BBC offered specialized overnight strands such as BBC Select (an often-encrypted block providing airtime for specialized professional programmes), and the BBC Learning Zone (which broadcast academic programmes, such as from the Open University). The BBC's current "Sign Zone" strand broadcasts repeat programmes with in-vision interpretation in British Sign Language. Some channels may carry adult-oriented content in the graveyard slot, depending on local regulations. Live events from other time zones (most often sports) may sometimes fall in overnight slots, such as daytime events from the Asia-Pacific region on channels in the Americas, and prime-time events from the Americas on channels in Europe for example. Some anime-oriented streaming services (such as Crunchyroll and Hidive) have arrangements with Japanese networks to premiere episodes at the same time as their domestic television airings, often falling within the overnight hours in the Americas, particularly Cartoon Network's late night Toonami block on Adult Swim, which airs from Saturday nights to Sunday mornings.

From 1988 to 2014 in the United States, some cable networks (such as Nickelodeon, A&E, the Discovery Channel and The Weather Channel) aired educational programs during overnight hours as part of the Cable in the Classroom initiative, intended for educators to tape for later presentation to their students.

==== Syndicated programming ====
Since the 1980s, graveyard slots on American broadcast stations, once populated by broadcasts of syndicated reruns and old movies, have increasingly been used for program-length infomercials or simulcasting of home shopping channels, which provide a media outlet with revenue and a source of programming without any programming expenses or the possible malfunctions which might come with going off-the-air. In the United States, graveyard slots are also used as a de facto "death slot" for syndicated programs that either failed to find an audience or which a station acquired but otherwise has no room to air in a more appropriate time slot where the program would otherwise benefit; in previous years, the most often seen original programming in the overnight period were low-rated game shows and daytime talk shows being burned off, with the former being more common in the 1980s and the latter the following decade. During the 1980s and 1990s, some stations—particularly news-producing stations that contracted with CNN or CONUS Communications to provide supplemental coverage of national and world news—also used the overnight period to simulcast 24-hour news services Headline News and All News Channel.

In many cases where a television station carries an irregularly scheduled special event, breaking news or severe weather coverage that preempts a network or syndicated program, the station may elect to air the preempted programming in a graveyard slot during the same broadcast day to fulfill their contractual obligations. Additionally, in markets with sports teams whose coaches' and team highlights shows preempt programs in the prime access hour before primetime, the overnight period also allows a preempted program to air in some form on a station without penalty to the syndicator, or for stations to air network programming preempted for local-interest programming, breaking news or weather, or sporting events.

In almost every market in the United States, MyNetworkTV has seen its timeslot downgraded to the graveyard slot, sometimes sharing secondary affiliations with digital multicast television networks carried on digital subchannels. Originally launched as a general broadcast network in 2006 meant for primetime clearance, following the merger of two smaller networks—The WB and UPN—into The CW, the network (which primarily signed with affiliates of the two moribund networks that did not take the CW affiliation) saw its entire slate of original programming fail in the ratings, and by 2010 the network transitioned to a syndication service carrying nightly rerun blocks of syndicated programming from broadcast networks and cable channels. Generally, this is done as the stations of MyNetworkTV have become part of duopolies with major network affiliate stations (and even those owned by its parent company, Fox Television Stations, whose former UPN affiliates formed the nucleus of MyNetworkTV) and those stations have used the network's affiliates to carry extended primetime local newscasts, local sports and encore runs of its sister Fox affiliate's syndicated programs which provide steadier ratings and revenue than MyNetworkTV's non-original schedule.

==== News programming ====
Local news programming has also aired in the overnight slot in various forms; between the 1960s and the mid-1980s, many American television stations ran abbreviated "sign-off editions" providing brief summaries of local (and more prominently), national and international headlines, sports scores and a short- to medium-range weather forecast, including overnight breaking news stories that may have occurred after the station's late newscast earlier in the evening. One such station, Chicago independent station WFLD (now a Fox owned-and-operated station), utilized the KeyFax teletext system to provide an overnight news service, known as Nite-Owl, that aired until the resumption of regular programming each day from 1981 to 1982. Beginning in the late 1970s and early 1980s, many news-producing stations began to rebroadcast their late-evening newscasts (updated during severe weather events to incorporate live cut-ins providing current radar data and active alerts in place of the newscast's original weather segment, and additional updates on breaking news from the original broadcast) and live sports scores (primarily for games on the West Coast and games that were in overtime when the late newscast began), primarily for the convenience of late-shift workers who were not awake hours earlier for the broadcast's initial airing.

By the 2000s, with the increasing prominence of online news coverage by many stations, the practice of airing late news rebroadcasts went into decline in favor of syndicated programs, extended feeds of overnight network newscasts and infomercials, though some NBC affiliates that abandoned the practice years earlier would bring back late news rebroadcasts to their late-night schedules after the network ceded the 1:35 a.m. ET timeslot following the 2021 cancellation of A Little Late with Lilly Singh. Since the late 2000s in the United States many stations have offered an increasingly early local newscast, which now begins as early as 4:00 a.m. in some major and mid-sized markets, targeting those who work early shifts (including assembly line workers, longshoremen and farmers) or are returning from late shifts; this early newscast would fit into the overnight daypart rather than the early morning slot.

==== Public affairs and educational programming ====
In addition to being used to fulfill contractual obligations for network and syndicated programming, graveyard slots can also be used as dumping grounds for government-mandated public affairs programming, as well as in-house programming a station group is mandated by their parent company to carry that would otherwise be unpalatable in prime timeslots. One example of the latter mandated by Sinclair Broadcast Group in the United States is The Right Side, a public affairs program hosted by political commentator Armstrong Williams (who has business interests with Sinclair) that is typically aired by Sinclair-affiliated stations, and is intended to air in weekend late morning slots as a complement to the national networks' Sunday morning talk shows. However, The Right Side is often programmed in graveyard slots on most Sinclair stations who locally choose to instead fill the weekend morning slots with paid programming (including religious programs and real estate presentation shows), weekend morning newscasts and local public affairs programming, or have no scheduling room due to network sports telecasts and mandated educational programming.

With regards to educational (or E/I) programming in the United States, some stations attempt to bury mandated E/I programming in graveyard slots, though under current regulations by the Federal Communications Commission (FCC) under the Children's Television Act of 1990, children's television series must air during times when children are awake. Current standards implemented by the FCC in July 2019 require that educational programs air at any time between 6:00 a.m. and 10:00 p.m.; however under the 2019 rules, individual stations have the option to place up to 13 hours of educational programs per quarter (52 hours annually) on a digital subchannel, or air up to 13 hours per quarter of specials or short-form content considered to be educational in concept.

Thus, these stations will "bury" E/I-compliant programs in the middle of a block of infomercials during the daytime hours, when most children are either at school or (on weekends) asleep or participating in youth sports, scouting or other activities, and are unlikely to ever see them, though a loophole allowing more advertising for shows targeted to teenage audiences means that most educational programming shown on American commercial broadcast television since the 2010s consists of generic documentary, game show, dramatic, or biographical programming unlikely to be of interest to most children, which in concert with the rule changes—which also eliminated mandates for subchannels to comply with the Children's Television Act (although many networks intended for placement on subchannels continue to offer educational programs voluntarily)—has resulted in further attrition of already low audience shares for educational programming on American television.

== Other examples in the United States ==
Outside of the traditional overnight slots, various examples of graveyard slots in the United States exist. While the reasons vary, often these time periods are viewed with much lower interest from programmers as opposed to other periods of the day (particularly prime time from Monday to Thursday nights).

=== Weekdays, noon to 1 p.m. ===
Before the 1970s, the noon hour was often viewed as a popular "lunch slot" where daytime shows such as Jeopardy! were popular with a larger-than-average audience that included both college and high school students and employees either returning home or eating at a restaurant on their lunch break, in addition to the traditional American daytime audience of stay-at-home housewives. However as the 1970s dawned, many network affiliates began introducing local midday newscasts, which resulted in the time slot becoming a "death slot". Local news in this slot usually consists of stories from the morning newscast repeated with spare updating for newer details to such earlier items and stories that have happened since (including local political meetings and judicial proceedings from high-profile criminal and civil cases), business and consumer news segments (including live stock market prices), farm reports in mainly rural markets, and community interest segments where organizations are highlighted in an interview setting, along with paid placement advertorial segments for businesses.

Stations that do not carry news in this slot usually air syndicated fare or an infomercial; in numerous cases, educational programs can be buried in this slot or any other daytime slot as a form of malicious compliance with the mandate for such programs. Mainly to accommodate affiliates in the Central and Mountain time zones that choose to air local news at noon in their respective markets, CBS still offers an option for affiliates to air The Young and the Restless at noon Eastern (11:00 a.m. Central), but actual participation in this varies by individual station. (NBC also allowed this option for Days of Our Lives until September 2022, when the soap moved to co-owned streaming service Peacock to accommodate the new afternoon newscast NBC News Daily; ABC, by virtue of the soap's designated 1:00 p.m. ET timeslot, aired All My Children during the noon hour in the Central and Mountain time zones until its broadcast run ended in September 2011, although some stations opted to air the show and its timeslot successor The Chew on a one-hour-early, day-behind basis to air local midday newscasts and/or syndicated programming during the slot until the September 2018 premiere of GMA3: What You Need to Know.)

After the 1970s ended, there were very few network programs that had survived for more than a year in the noon timeslot, including Ryan's Hope and Super Password. However, there have been numerous network shows that have aired in the second half-hour of this timeslot; examples include The Young and the Restless (whose first half-hour has dominated the timeslot since 1988) and its sister CBS soap opera The Bold and the Beautiful (which has led out of CBS affiliates' noon newscasts in many markets, particularly in the Central and Mountain time zones), Loving (and its short-lived spinoff The City) and Port Charles on ABC, and Sunset Beach on NBC. (The latter two were canceled after a few years on the air.) Since the mid-2000s, the 12:30 p.m. timeslot on most ABC and NBC affiliates has been usually filled with local news and lifestyle programs.

=== Weekdays, 4 to 5 p.m. ===
When the noon time slot became unfavorable in the late 1970s, networks began doubling up airings of their noon shows at 4:00 p.m. However, this time slot had also quickly become unfavorable as many stations chose to preempt network offerings in favor of more lucrative syndicated programs during this time, including nationally syndicated talk shows hosted by Mike Douglas, Merv Griffin, Dinah Shore and Phil Donahue (all of which were primarily entertainment-focused with the exception of Donahue's which focused on serious subject matters including politics and cultural issues). As a result, the networks were faced with increasingly fewer affiliates airing network programs in this time slot and eventually abandoned this practice: NBC ceded the hour when it moved The Gong Show to a midday slot in late 1977, eventually followed by ABC canceling the soap opera Edge of Night at the end of 1984 and CBS ending production on Press Your Luck in the late summer of 1986; the latter two networks, however, would continue to program occasional afterschool specials for children during the hour until the mid-1990s (with ABC being the last Big Three network to end that practice as well as any moribund effort to program the 4:00 hour in January 1997). Currently, the only efforts to program the 4:00 p.m. hour on weekdays are special sporting events that are held on select weeks during the year, such as the UEFA Champions League, the Olympic Games, the FIFA World Cup, NFL games on Thanksgiving Day, and college football bowl games; for example, CBS has aired UEFA Champions League games with 3:00 p.m. Eastern time starts on Tuesdays and Wednesdays during the tournament's knockout phase since 2020.

During the 1980s, a slew of newer nationally syndicated talk shows made their debut, with the most prominent example being The Oprah Winfrey Show. Originally a locally based morning show in Chicago, Oprah made its debut as a nationally syndicated talk show in 1986 and soon came to dominate the time slot in many markets over the course of its 25-year run. Since the 1990s, the expansion of local television news has led to stations without major syndicated hits choosing to offer local news in this hour, particularly on stations that did not carry Oprah. By 2012, most networks' daytime programming had ended at 3:00 p.m. Eastern time, and many stations have begun offering up to three hours of local news, interrupted either by a 4:30 p.m. syndicated program or the network news (which networks usually broadcast live at 6:30 p.m Eastern time), with some even going as far as airing local news at 3:00 p.m. Most newscasts that air before 5:00 p.m. are similar to noon newscasts in terms of their local news content (albeit with more details and interviews than earlier) and emphasis on consumer reports and entertainment features (including live shots from local events and concerts), but also include short-range evening weather forecasts as well as traffic reports targeting evening rush hour commuters; sports coverage is usually not considered part of these newscasts as most weekday sporting events take place in the evenings, and those that do prioritize interviews with local athletes, as well as more specialized coverage of major events. In some cases (primarily baseball), if a team is playing a travel-day game in the early afternoon or a rescheduled doubleheader game or special sporting event coverage, the highlights of that game are posted on the 5:00 p.m. newscast.

=== Friday night death slot ===
Perhaps the most infamous example of a graveyard slot, ironically, has been during prime time on Friday nights since the 1990s. Before this decade, several television series during the late 1970s and 1980s (and well into the early 1990s) had become widely popular among viewing audiences, and these programs—including Dallas and Falcon Crest on CBS and Miami Vice on NBC—became so popular that most programs that were scheduled against them were doomed to cancellation because of the competition, which marked the beginning of a phenomenon known as the "Friday night death slot." Other programs also saw success on Friday nights during this period, including ABC's The Brady Bunch and NBC's Sanford and Son during the 1970s.

However, as the 1990s progressed, fewer viewers (particularly those in the much-sought after 18-49 demographic) stayed home to watch television on Friday nights, in favor of partaking in social gatherings (including recreational activities, dining out and going out on dates) and entertainment offerings (such as sporting events, concerts and movies) outside the house, leading to a revival of the phrase in a new context in that a series on Friday was still more likely to lose money and lag in viewership compared to shows on other nights, regardless of its direct competition. More importantly, with media conglomerates now owning both television networks and film studios (e.g., Comcast's ownership of NBC and Universal Pictures under its NBCUniversal umbrella), the former now especially tends to downplay programming by corporate demand to attract moviegoers to theaters on the traditional opening night for major films.

Because of this trend, networks have since programmed inexpensive reality programming or news magazines on this night instead of scripted programs. Consequently, scripted programs that do end up airing on Friday night have often been moved there from more lucrative Monday-Thursday evening time slots due to poor performance, and this is often an indication that the series is facing cancellation, with its fate set in some cases either by extenuating circumstances or by certain goals for the producer or distributor in mind. The former was the case in the 2004–05 season with the ABC family sitcom 8 Simple Rules, whose ratings declined following the death of lead actor and protagonist John Ritter, while the latter pertained to the Fox sitcom 'Til Death, which despite mediocre ratings was kept alive on Friday nights well into the 2009–10 season to garner enough episodes for an ultimately short-lived syndication deal.

Since 2005, CBS is the only major network that continues to air a full lineup of first-run scripted programming on Fridays, and has been a strong performer on this night for the better part of the past three decades with a number of successful (if older-skewing) serials and police procedurals featuring veteran actors, with former Miami Vice lead actor Don Johnson (in the titular role for Nash Bridges from 1996 to 2001) and former Magnum, P.I. lead Tom Selleck (playing the lead character in Blue Bloods from 2010 to 2024, then its spinoff Boston Blue in 2025, based on the popularity of Blue Bloods) among the more prominent examples; other programs that CBS has slotted on Fridays during this period to decent viewership have included Ghost Whisperer, CSI: NY and Fire Country. Historically, its former semi-sister network, The CW (previously co-owned by CBS parent Paramount Global and Warner Bros. Discovery and their respective predecessors until Nexstar Media Group, its largest affiliate operator, bought a majority stake in the network from the former two conglomerates in 2021) also maintained a lineup of younger-skewing scripted fantasy and action dramas from 2010 to 2022, with similar success.

Despite the aforementioned challenges of the 1990s, ABC also had notable success on Friday evenings with its TGIF lineup of sitcoms aimed at family and teenage audiences beginning in 1989 (including Full House, Family Matters, Boy Meets World, and Sabrina, the Teenage Witch), with its popular newsmagazine 20/20 (which moved to Fridays as the closing show for that night's lineup in 1987) serving as a lead-out, but the programming block's ratings began to wane in the late 1990s, in part also influenced by a botched attempt by CBS (called the CBS Block Party) to compete full-force with ABC during the 1997–98 season (even picking up Family Matters and Step by Step from ABC), before it eventually abandoned this strategy in 2000, first in favor of more adult-targeted comedies (e.g. Two Guys and a Girl) and later the aforementioned primetime serials. Since the 2010s, ABC has maintained stability on the night with the aforementioned 20/20 (which permanently expanded to two hours in 2019, and had shifted focus a few years earlier toward primarily true-crime stories not unlike its longtime competitor on NBC, Dateline NBC) as well as the business-oriented reality series Shark Tank, which has played a major role in the growth of various entrepreneurs' ventures since the show's launch.

Despite being a known graveyard slot, there have been notable exceptions to this rule, including the aforementioned CBS serials as well as NBC's Homicide: Life on the Street, Law & Order: Special Victims Unit and Providence during the 1990s and early 2000s. Family-oriented sitcoms, including the aforementioned sitcoms during ABC's TGIF years (as well as Reba on The WB during the 2000s and Last Man Standing on ABC and Fox in the 2010s), have also been modestly successful on Friday nights, and WWE SmackDown has also experienced success on broadcast and cable television since its launch on UPN in 1999. In addition, a handful of cable channels have also had success with Friday night programming; prominent examples have included the Disney Channel, which throughout the 2000s and 2010s aired a number of made-for-TV movies and scripted sitcoms that appealed to a pre-teen audience including Wizards of Waverly Place, Phineas and Ferb, The Suite Life on Deck, Jessie and Girl Meets World (largely serving as somewhat of a successor to sister network ABC's original TGIF lineup, albeit with a younger audience in comparison), and Hallmark Channel, which then as now premieres original made-for-TV movies on Friday and Saturday nights several times per year as an attempt to keep potential moviegoers at home.

=== Saturday nights ===
Until the 1990s, many popular series also aired on Saturdays, with more notable examples including Gunsmoke, Have Gun – Will Travel, All in the Family, The Mary Tyler Moore Show, The Bob Newhart Show and The Carol Burnett Show during the 1960s and 1970s on CBS; The Facts of Life, Hunter, Amen, 227, and The Golden Girls and its spin-offs (most notably Empty Nest) during the 1980s and early 1990s on NBC; and T. J. Hooker, The Love Boat and Fantasy Island during the late 1970s and 1980s on ABC. Most networks maintained a full schedule, though the night was also often used for airing movies and select sporting events. Many programs aired on Saturdays during the 1990s as well to sizable success including Dr. Quinn, Medicine Woman, Early Edition and Walker, Texas Ranger on CBS; Sisters, The Pretender and Profiler on NBC; and Cops and America's Most Wanted on Fox.

Since then however, a similar situation to Friday nights emerged, with the same issue of fewer viewers available to watch television on Friday nights now extending to Saturday nights as well, although to a more pronounced degree as Saturday nights are a particularly popular night for moviegoing and social gatherings outside the house, especially among older teenagers and younger adults. For that reason, the mainstream U.S. networks have largely abandoned original programming on Saturday nights in favor of reruns or reality programming, as well as to air episodes of programs that either have failing ratings or have been canceled and therefore are being burned off to finish airing their original episodes. Otherwise, outside of popular sporting events (see below), the night is used by the networks to air encore presentations of their weekday primetime series' most recent episodes or occasional broadcasts of more recent theatrical movies. Local stations also use the night to carry specialized local news programs, including documentaries and political debates, where it would otherwise air their affiliate network's encore repeats (which in this case are usually relegated to graveyard slots following their already-scheduled regular network and syndicated offerings for the night).

ABC was the first of the Big Three networks to cease offering original first-run programming (outside of newsmagazines and sports) on Saturdays; the network had lost ground on that night to NBC, CBS and later Fox after The Love Boat ended in 1986 (with only the 1991–96 police procedural dramedy The Commish lasting more than three seasons on that night in the time since), and largely failed in subsequent years to buoy its standing against its Saturday competition. One notable example was its attempt to create a comedy block during the 1991–92 season, which saw some of its older stalwart sitcoms, including Who's the Boss? and Growing Pains, move from their previous Tuesday and Wednesday slots in September 1991, with both later being joined by fellow veteran and Friday tentpole Perfect Strangers to help form what became the TGIF-inspired I Love Saturday Night lineup. The block only lasted for five weeks in February 1992; after experiencing sharp ratings declines following their move to Saturdays, Boss and Pains ended after that season while Strangers got an abbreviated eighth season, burned off in the Summer of 1993, to properly close out the series. ABC tried again in the 1998–99 season with a lineup initially consisting of America's Funniest Home Videos (which had seen its ratings drop following the departure and replacement of original host Bob Saget with co-successors Daisy Fuentes and John Fugelsang, and its displacement from its original Sunday slot to make room for The Wonderful World of Disney the previous season), a revival of Fantasy Island and Cupid; neither survived past that season (with AFV being relegated to occasional specials before it was revived as a regular series in 2001), prompting ABC to give up and run movies in the slot instead starting with the 1999–2000 season.

Around the same time, CBS and NBC also ended all valiant attempts to compete on Saturday nights, particularly as the former's efforts to offer family-oriented dramas and the latter's at more action- and crime-oriented shows began to fade out. Both networks ceased any serious competition on this night in 2001 when CBS canceled Walker, Texas Ranger and NBC—which ended its primetime scripted programming efforts on that night following the 2000 cancellations of The Pretender and Profiler—failed with the original incarnation of the XFL. Aside from repackaged, one-hour vintage episodes and retrospectives of its popular late night sketch comedy/variety program Saturday Night Live that air in the 10:00 p.m. slot, most if not all of NBC's Saturday evening lineup today consists of sports and encore programming, as well as broadcasts of the aforementioned Dateline NBC. (Since 2021, SNL—which, for most of its run, aired live in the Eastern and Central time zones and was rebroadcast with minor edits for any indecent material in the rest of the country—has aired newer episodes live coast-to-coast, resulting in them being shown during prime time in the Mountain, Pacific and Alaska time zones.)

CBS, however, continued to offer first-run shows on Saturdays until the 2003–04 season (when crime dramas Hack and The District ended their runs due to declining viewership) before switching to a lineup consisting of mainly crime drama reruns and stalwart 48 Hours, which transitioned from a documentary-style newsmagazine usually formatted into multiple segments to a true crime documentary format during the 2004–05 season and as of 2026, represents perhaps the only source of original, first-run programming (excluding sports) on the night on American network television. CBS would sparingly wade into offering first-run scripted and reality programs on Saturdays in subsequent years: the Canadian–French co-production Ransom aired on that night as a midseason series from 2017 to 2019, and the final episodes of each week of the American version of Love Island (which aired its episodes over multiple nights in a similar manner to fellow reality series Big Brother, which also offered first-run Saturday episodes from 2000 to 2005) aired on Saturdays during its second season in 2020. Fox, which inaugurated its Saturday schedule in July 1987 with a primarily sitcom-centered lineup, continued to air America's Most Wanted and Cops on Saturday nights until both programs ended their network runs in 2011 and 2013, respectively (with Cops moving to Spike (now Paramount Network, where it remained until its 2020 cancellation in the wake of the fallout from the George Floyd protests) and America's Most Wanted moving to Lifetime, where it remained until its cancellation in 2013; Fox would revive AMW in 2021).

Upon launching in September 2006, The CW let its affiliates handle programming Saturday nights, following the practice of predecessors The WB (which, ironically, offered a Saturday morning children’s block starting in September 1995 that would be integrated into The CW’s schedule) and UPN, both of which opted not to program the night themselves, even as their prime time schedules expanded in the four-year period following their January 1995 debuts. As with affiliates of their predecessors (and since 2009, de jure UPN/WB co-successor MyNetworkTV), CW affiliates typically filled Saturday nights with movies, sports and/or syndicated programs (the latter becoming more common in the slot since the late 2010s with the declining availability of syndicated film packages). When The CW began programming Saturday nights for the first time during the 2021–22 season, it broke from the modern-day sports/newsmagazines/reruns concept by offering an original, first-run lineup of unscripted comedy, magic and reality competition series; these efforts largely ended two seasons later (2023–24), when the network began airing selected primetime Atlantic Coast Conference football and basketball games under a sublicensing agreement with Raycom Sports (later joined in 2025 by frequent evening overruns of second-tier NASCAR O'Reilly Auto Parts Series afternoon races), with movies and documentaries otherwise filling the Saturday prime time slot. MyNetworkTV, which also launched in September 2006 to fill evening airtime on stations passed over by The CW, initially offered recap episodes of its first four weeknightly English-language telenovelas (Fashion House and Desire, replaced in December by Wicked Wicked Games and Watch Over Me) on Saturdays. After low ratings for the telenovelas prompted the switch to a generalized schedule and a weekly format for its final two dramas (American Heiress and Saints & Sinners), the network’s Saturday lineup shifted focus towards sports (consisting of MMA showcase IFL Battleground and NFL Network news recap show NFL Total Access) during the 2006–07 midseason and then mainly to movies in the spring of 2008. MyNetworkTV ceded the Saturday night slot to its affiliates when it transitioned from a conventional network into a programming service in September 2009.

More recently, Saturday night has also become a particularly popular slot for live sports programming, which, despite their sometimes excessively high bids for broadcast rights, provide a reliable and critical base of live viewers that is sometimes carried over from afternoon sports telecasts earlier in the day. ABC became the first such network to make this move in 2006, when its occasional Saturday night college football broadcasts became a regular part of its fall schedule under the Saturday Night Football umbrella. While initially more the exception than the rule, the weekly showcase's success—which also coincided with the rise of college football to become, in some respects, the second most popular television sports property in the United States behind the National Football League (NFL)—has also resulted in the night being used to also air other sports properties, including college football on the other major networks as well as The CW, NBA and NHL broadcasts on ABC (and previously on NBC in the case of the latter league), various events including American qualifying championships for Olympic sports on NBC, and Major League Baseball games on Fox (under the Baseball Night in America umbrella). UFC fights (primarily undercards to pay-per-view main events) also aired on Fox from 2011 to 2019, helping play a major role in the once-financially challenged mixed martial arts promotion becoming a popular sports property, with ratings and revenues often exceeding those of traditional boxing and WWE wrestling cards. (The over-the-air network rights to UFC undercards later moved to ABC, through a deal with ESPN, in 2020 and then CBS, with main events carried on co-owned streaming service Paramount+, in 2026.)

Despite being a known graveyard time period, some channels have gained or maintained success on Saturday nights. Perhaps (and arguably) the most famous example has been NBC's late night sketch comedy variety program Saturday Night Live, which has been a staple of that network (and also that of the American pop culture conscience) since its 1975 debut, and has gone on to launch the careers of dozens of comedians and other actors; Fox would provide a formidable competitor to SNL in 1995 with Mad TV, a taped satirical sketch program that lasted for 14 seasons (until its initial cancellation in 2009) and was that network's only successful late-night offering. Other notable exceptions have included Nickelodeon, which successfully aired a Saturday evening lineup of first-run programs aimed at pre-teens and teenagers—originally branded as SNICK for its first 12 years, and then as TEENick from 2005 to 2009—from August 1992 to November 2021 (including such popular series as Clarissa Explains It All, All That, Are You Afraid of the Dark?, Kenan & Kel, iCarly and Victorious) as well as Lifetime and Syfy, both of which have had respectable success with made-for-TV movies that regularly aired in Saturday primetime (Syfy during the 2000s up through the mid-2010s, and Lifetime since the early 2000s).

Premium cable networks have typically used Saturday nights to showcase pay-cable premieres of theatrical and made-for-cable films, first-run specials (including concerts and stand-up comedy performances), and/or combat sports events. HBO began running all of its movie premieres exclusively on Saturdays in June 1992, marketing the promise of "a new movie every Saturday night" throughout the year; the frequency of movie premieres in the designated slot substantially declined in the early 2020s largely due to most of HBO's distribution partners (outside of sister studio Warner Bros.) migrating their pay-TV release windows to streaming competitors of co-owned Max (particularly services operated by their parent studios like Hulu and Peacock), an issue that has also affected rivals Showtime, Starz and MGM+ in recent years as streaming platforms have proliferated (including those with corporate ties to major studios) and consolidation has taken place in the studio business. Albeit with some exceptions, boxing and mixed martial arts matches (including events shown on pay-cable and pay-per-view) also have typically been held on Saturdays; HBO and, to a somewhat lesser degree, Showtime aired most of their fight cards (including events produced by their respective pay-per-view units) during the latter part of Saturday primetime starting in the early 1990s until both networks discontinued their live sports offerings. (HBO, which began airing boxing events exclusively on that night in 1992, ended its boxing telecasts in 2018; Showtime, which continued to air some of its boxing and post-2007 MMA events on Friday nights, shut down its sports division amid cutbacks instituted in 2023 by parent Paramount Global, owner of remaining U.S. sports division CBS Sports.)

=== Weekend prime access and late nights ===
To this day, and also throughout most of the history of American television, local stations have often filled their weekend late night slots with off-network syndicated reruns of prime time sitcom and drama series; as of 2025, the most prominent distributors in weekend off-network syndication are CBS Media Ventures and Disney–ABC Domestic Television, which each presently offer a selection of drama reruns, distributed primarily to their respective CBS and ABC affiliates. NBC affiliates, because of the presence of Saturday Night Live, have typically aired off-network syndicated reruns either leading out of SNL—and in some cases, the network's Saturday overnight programming—or relegated them exclusively to Sunday nights in recent years (compared to such legacy serials as Quincy, M.E., Highway to Heaven and ER), with NBCUniversal Syndication Studios' reruns of their popular Law & Order and Chicago franchises largely being sold to affiliates of other networks (including owned-and-operated affiliates of Fox), and often outside of weekend late nights including on the aforementioned MyNetworkTV programming service; since 2008, the network has offered a 90-minute block of lifestyle programs from its sister production unit, LXTV, to air as a lead-out to SNL.

Outside of off-network primetime drama reruns, other programs that usually air during this time period include long-form interview programs (including Entertainers with Byron Allen and In Depth with Graham Bensinger), movie showcases (including horror-themed Svengoolie and B-movie showcase Off Beat Cinema, both staples of the Saturday late-night slot), and weekend editions of infotainment news programs (often with curated segments repackaged from earlier in the week or, in the case of Entertainment Tonight, special retrospect editions focused on a single topic). Co-distributors Sony Pictures Television and CBS Media Ventures also offer a selection of episodes from the previous season's runs of their popular weekday game shows Wheel of Fortune and Jeopardy! to air on weekends (most commonly in the Saturday early fringe slot), usually airing in their traditional weekday slots or during the early evening period where a local newscast would usually air on weekdays.

Historically, music and variety shows were mainstays of late-night syndication throughout much of the 1970s and 1980s. These included the big band-oriented The Lawrence Welk Show (which entered syndication in 1971 after being canceled by ABC), the country music-oriented Hee Haw and Pop! Goes the Country, the mostly rock- and comedy-oriented Don Kirshner's Rock Concert, the pop/dance-oriented Solid Gold, and the soul/R&B-oriented Soul Train (which lasted well into the 2000s). Weekly competition programs, including the athletically oriented American Gladiators, and the talent competition shows Star Search and Showtime at the Apollo (the latter of which also aired live performances from popular soul and R&B musicians and comedians, but also became particularly known for its popular "Amateur Night" competitions similar in scope to Star Search), also often filled weekend late night time slots. In many cases, these programs either complemented Saturday Night Live on NBC affiliates (with NBC's New York City flagship, WNBC, historically having aired Rock Concert and Showtime at the Apollo as lead-outs to SNL in the past) or even competed against it on many CBS, ABC and Fox affiliates as well as independent stations.

During the weekends (particularly on Saturdays), the prime access hour also featured popular first-run weekly syndicated series including The Muppet Show during the 1970s, the lifestyle/interview program Lifestyles of the Rich and Famous during the 1980s to mid-1990s, and the movie review program At the Movies (most well known under its original title of Siskel & Ebert) during the 1980s up to the 2000s. The syndicated sports highlight program The George Michael Sports Machine—which originated out of NBC's owned-and-operated station in Washington, D.C., WRC-TV (whose namesake sports director at the time was the titular host), and was primarily distributed to local NBC affiliates—was a staple of the Sunday late access period from the 1980s to the 2000s, serving as a popular lead-out to or even being replaced by locally produced weekend sports wrap-up shows or sports wrap-up extensions of local Sunday night newscasts in many markets.

=== Weekend mornings and afternoons ===
Because people generally stay out later on Friday and Saturday nights than other nights of the week, people also tend to sleep in longer on weekend mornings. The weekend morning 5:00–7:00 a.m. time slot is most commonly used by stations to air public affairs and (on Sundays) televangelism programs, although some air local morning newscasts within the time period. Nationally syndicated specialty news programs, including Matter of Fact (hosted by former NBC News and CNN anchor Soledad O'Brien and mandated to air on stations owned by its production company, Hearst Television) and Full Measure (hosted by former CBS News anchor Sharyl Attkisson and mandated to air on stations owned by its production company, Sinclair Broadcast Group), also air during weekend morning timeslots in many markets, often complementing their affiliate networks' and local stations' morning news programs and Sunday morning talk shows.

Until the 2000s, Saturday mornings on broadcast television were dominated by animated and, in some cases, live-action programs widely watched by children. Children's programming on commercial broadcast television entered into broader decline during that decade, as the more conventional formats became increasingly unprofitable for networks and syndication distributors because of restrictions on children's advertising under the Children's Television Act (which limit advertising during children's programs to 12 minutes per hour on weekdays and 10½ minutes on weekends, and prohibit promotion of tie-in products associated with the program); audience erosion caused by viewer preferences shifting to children's cable networks like Nickelodeon, Disney Channel and Cartoon Network; and attempts by the "Big Three" networks to pair the youth-targeted Saturday morning programs with local and national weekend morning newscasts (dating to the 1992 launch of Saturday Today and the teen-oriented TNBC block on NBC) creating clashing audience demographics that did not lend themselves to them adequately leading in and out of each other (such as the aforementioned TNBC block registering an average demographic above age 40 toward the end of its 1992–2002 run). Since the early 2010s, beginning with the September 2011 debut of ABC's Weekend Adventure (produced under contract with Litton Entertainment, now Hearst Media Production Group), the cartoons and live-action comedies once found on Saturday mornings on the networks and in syndication have been replaced by educational documentary series (most prominently in the form of time-leased blocks such as NBC's The More You Know, CBS WKND and The CW's One Magnificent Morning) intended for older children and teenagers to meet federal educational programming mandates; however because these programs are less likely to clash with local morning newscasts and network morning shows audience-wise, and the viewing habits of their intended audience largely have migrated to cable and streaming services, viewership for the educational documentary blocks tend to skew mainly towards older adults.

As has been the case since the beginning of television, the major networks have also generally programmed weekend afternoons with sporting events. That being the case, particularly when no sporting events are airing (either from the networks or from syndicated distributors such as Raycom Sports), there is very little incentive to watch television after news and educational programs (on Saturday mornings) or political talk shows (on Sunday mornings) end, especially when a local team—particularly an NFL or college football team of either local or regional interest, or a local team from another sport in their leagues' respective postseasons—is airing on one station, prompting other stations to outright refuse to put on competitive programming.

Consequently, most stations in this situation air little-watched syndicated fare (often with pre-sold barter advertising), higher-profile syndicated reruns (occasionally airing as filler outside of their regular weekend slots), and paid programming in this slot, and often use this time period to air educational and public affairs programming mandated either by station groups or federal broadcast regulations. Many stations also use this time period to broadcast specialty news and advertorial programs including local lifestyle and real estate presentation shows, as well as regional lifestyle programs (such as Texas Country Reporter, which has been a weekend staple on most television stations serving the U.S. state of Texas since the 1970s). For parts of the 1990s after losing NFL rights, CBS and NBC aired movies in the late afternoons if they did not carry sports content. Prior to 2016, when it was not carrying content from sister network ESPN, ABC aired reality programming reruns in the late afternoon slot (such as Million Dollar Mind Game). Some stations also preempt such network programs to air on tape delay episodes of syndicated programs affected by special news coverage or TV specials from earlier in the week.

Many stations have also used the weekend afternoon slot to broadcast movies. Although largely a staple of independent stations during this timeframe, until the 1990s, some stations affiliated with the Big Three networks (ABC, NBC and CBS) aired movies during certain weekend afternoon slots without any scheduled sports events; this practice gradually ended as syndicators began selling their film packages mainly to Fox and independent stations (including stations that eventually affiliated with The WB and UPN as early as 1995). The number of movie packages sold through commercial syndication has steadily declined since the late 1990s, largely as a result of available local airtime being reduced on stations carrying Fox, The WB and UPN as those networks expanded their prime time schedules during that decade (most of those stations, dating to when they were independents, prominently showcased movies in prime time); and cable television and eventually streaming platforms emerging as key players in distributing theatrical films. Distributors of the remaining movie packages are presently able to select from Fox, CW, MyNetworkTV and certain independent stations; however, the launches of Fox and The CW's sports divisions (in 1994 and 2023, respectively) have also reduced the availability for their stations to air movies on weekend afternoons as their sports offerings have expanded.

=== Sunday nights (7–8 p.m. and 10–11 p.m. during the NFL season) ===
Because of overruns from Sunday afternoon National Football League (NFL) games, Fox (in the earlier 7:00 slot) and, to a lesser extent, CBS (in the latter 10:00 slot) have had difficulty launching shows in these Sunday evening time slots. To handle overruns, Fox and CBS both use different strategies to handle prime time programming, with other networks attempting various means of counterprogramming to meet parity on the night.

==== Fox ====
Fox, which has primarily carried Sunday afternoon National Football Conference (NFC) road games since acquiring rights to these games from CBS beginning with the 1994 NFL season, originally preempted scheduled programming during the 7:00 hour if an NFL game overran its time slot, often to the frustration of fans of series such as King of the Hill and Malcolm in the Middle, which often had episodes joined in progress or unseen in the Eastern or Central time zones until they aired again during summer reruns (months after the preceding NFL season ended). The network has since addressed the issue by clearing out the time slot completely for an NFL post-game show titled The OT during the league's regular season and setting aside a portion for short-run animated series under its Animation Domination (or, from 2014 to 2019, Sunday Funday) block, though mid-season replacement series have still had problems finding an audience in the time slot.

==== CBS ====
CBS, which has held the rights to most Sunday afternoon American Football Conference (AFC) road games since the 1998 NFL season and previously did the same for the NFC from 1956 to 1993, protects its acclaimed newsmagazine 60 Minutes by delaying its entire prime time schedule if a game overruns (a practice adopted by the network in 2012), resulting in the show scheduled for the 10:00 p.m. ET slot being pushed well past its original start time and occasionally being bumped to allow local CBS affiliates to air their local newscasts as close to 11:00 p.m. ET as possible.

After a series of new programs failed in that timeslot, beginning in 2010, CBS attempted to stabilize it by moving an established series (usually one co-owned CBS Media Ventures already offers to stations in off-network syndication) there, starting with CSI: Miami which moved from its original Monday night slot to Sunday nights but was nonetheless canceled after two seasons in its Sunday time slot. For the 2019–20 season, CBS used the 10:00 p.m. slot to wrap up two of its veteran series with the final season of Madam Secretary airing in the fall followed by the final CBS season of Criminal Minds (which once served as a lead-out to Super Bowl XLI in 2007, and has since been revived on Paramount+) in the winter and spring, while for the 2020–21 season it aired what ultimately turned out to be the final season of NCIS: New Orleans.

Starting in 2024–25, CBS chose to forego airing first-run dramas in the 10:00 p.m. slot until after the conclusion of the NFL season in mid-February. (For the 2024–25 midseason, The Equalizer was moved into the hour to accommodate the new medical crime drama Watson in its former 9:00 p.m. ET slot.) To account for the football overruns, the network aired occasional 90-minute editions of 60 Minutes on certain weeks following choice late-afternoon games, and began filling the 10:00 hour with selected prime time drama and sitcom repeats for the duration of the NFL season.

==== NBC ====
NBC holds the contractual rights to the NFL's Sunday Night Football package, which occupies the entire evening schedule during the fall and early winter; the pre-game show Football Night in America generally leads off the night in the 7:00 p.m. hour. Per NFL broadcast rules, the pre-game show utilizes a carousel reporting format to cover early games (approximately 1:00 p.m. ET) before the conclusion of late (4:00 p.m. ET) NFL games (including most games on the West Coast), and then transitions to a quick rundown before focusing on the upcoming game within the last 20 minutes before kickoff. After their NFL coverage ends in mid-January, NBC usually airs some limited first-run and encore programming for the rest of the season. Beginning with the 2025–26 season, NBC (which previously held NBA broadcast rights from 1954 to 1962 and again from 1990 to 2002) will carry a package of NBA basketball games to fill the Sunday prime time slot during the late winter and spring after Sunday Night Football concludes for the season.

When NBC held the rights to air Sunday afternoon AFC games from 1965 (when it acquired the television rights to the AFC's predecessor, the American Football League, from ABC) until losing those rights to CBS in 1998, the latter-day issues with regards to CBS were virtually nonexistent since most of the programs that NBC aired in the 7:00 p.m. ET slot usually trailed 60 Minutes (following its CBS debut in September 1968) in the ratings. Dateline NBC, the longest-lasting effort among a string of otherwise unsuccessful hard newsmagazines launched by the network during the 1990s, expanded to Sundays to compete full-force with 60 Minutes—offering lighter or true crime-focused fare in contrast to its more hard news-oriented CBS counterpart—in March 1996; the Sunday edition of Dateline aired in the 7:00 p.m. slot for much of the time thereafter until the 2017–18 season (often subject to delay by late-afternoon games during NBC's last two years as the AFC broadcaster, and usually placed on hiatus during the NFL season following the 2006 transfer of the Sunday Night Football package from previous rightsholder ESPN), before briefly returning in a two-hour Weekend Mystery format for the latter half of the 2022–23 season (occasional episodes of varying airtime and length have also aired during the midseason and Summer months when it was not on that season's regular Sunday schedule).

The most significant programming controversy during NBC's tenure as the AFC broadcaster came in 1968 during a high-profile West Coast game that had its broadcast end prematurely in the Eastern and Central time zones to accommodate a made-for-TV adaptation of Heidi, the fallout from which prompted the network (and the NFL) to permanently change its procedures to allow games to finish before regular programming begins.

==== ABC ====
ABC, which has simulcast Monday Night Football games carried by sister network ESPN (which assumed the rights to the package from ABC in 2006) since 2022 and had last aired Sunday afternoon NFL games in 1951, has for most of its recent history carried America's Funniest Home Videos, a relatively low-cost and low-risk program popular for family viewing, in the early time slot on Sunday nights since the show premiered in 1990. From 1997 to 2003, however, the 7:00–9:00 p.m. ET time period was occupied by The Wonderful World of Disney; the anthology movie showcase was moved to Saturday nights in 2003–04 then later back to Sundays in the 9–11 p.m. ET slot in 2023-24, partly to accommodate the return of AFV to the Sunday early slot (it had previously aired on Fridays since resuming weekly episodes in 2001).

After the network stopped airing weekly movie presentations in the 9:00–11:00 p.m. ET slot in the 1998–99 television season, ABC had somewhat greater success later in the evening with scripted dramas (such as The Practice, Desperate Housewives and Brothers & Sisters); since the 2017–18 season, however, the final three hours of the network's Sunday lineup have been occupied primarily by reality competition and game shows (such as American Idol, The $100,000 Pyramid and Celebrity Family Feud), and since 2022–23, a revived Wonderful World of Disney during parts of the season—mainly from late August through late February—without any regularly scheduled unscripted programming leading out of AFV. (A noted exception was police procedural The Rookie, which aired in the 10:00 slot from 2019 to 2022, before moving to Tuesdays for the 2022–23 season.) The NFL's preference in 2005 for a marquee Sunday night game as opposed to Mondays, which became difficult to envision due to the success of such aforementioned scripted dramas (at the time, Grey's Anatomy and Desperate Housewives) as well as the then-recently launched Dancing with the Stars, played a factor in Monday Night Football moving to ESPN in 2006.

While some ABC affiliates occasionally simulcast Monday Night Football if a local team is playing (due to NFL rules requiring broadcast stations in team markets to simulcast national games not carried on network television), many others (including ABC's owned-and-operated stations) have deferred to rival stations in their market due to conflicts involving the live performance stages of Dancing with the Stars which aired on Monday nights for much of that show's history. Dancing moved from ABC to sister streaming service Disney+ in 2022, in order to allow the network to air occasional simulcasts of Monday Night Football, and was replaced on ABC's 2022–23 fall lineup by the reality dating series Bachelor in Paradise once the simulcasts ended; the network returned Dancing to its lineup in 2023 (with Disney+ continuing to carry it as a simulcast), but placed it on Tuesday nights to accommodate MNF games, which grew to a near-simulcast of the entire slate of MNF games due to labor disputes involving actors and writers in Hollywood that delayed the start of the season for many scripted network programs.

==== Other networks ====
The CW mainly filled the 7:00 p.m. early slot with various primetime reruns for its inaugural 2006–07 season, although new episodes of WB holdover Reba (airing its shortened sixth and final season) ran during the second half-hour between November 2006 and February 2007; for the 2007–08 season, the network ran advertorial entertainment programs (CW Now and Online Nation) that were widely considered a failure, with repeats of other shows taking over the slot by midseason. The CW chose to lease out its Sunday timeslot to production company Media Rights Capital (now MRC) for 2008–09, and placed the reality series In Harm's Way, also considered a failure, into the hour; the network's struggles to program Sunday evenings led it to turn the five-hour timeslot over to its affiliates following that season.

The CW would resume programming Sundays after a ten-year hiatus in the 2018–19 season; however it bucked the convention of programming the 7:00 p.m. hour (which American broadcast networks have programmed regularly since 1948–49, outside of a four-year period between the 1971 enactment and the 1975 revision of the since-repealed Prime Time Access Rule, when that responsibility was delegated to their affiliates), opting for its Sunday lineup to maintain the same 8:00–10:00 p.m. window it programs during the rest of the week before finally expanding into the 7:00 hour (filled mainly by drama reruns) in October 2023. MyNetworkTV has never programmed the night since it launched, although it did program on Saturday nights when it operated as a broadcast network during its first 3 years.

In contrast, The WB had varied scheduling strategies on Sunday evenings since the forerunner network (which launched nine months prior) began programming that night in September 1995. The WB aired first-run programming, usually sitcoms, during the 7:00 hour for all but four seasons—only two being consecutive—thereafter; for the seasons that did not have first-run shows fill the hour, the early slot was repurposed to showcase earlier-season reruns of popular WB series (7th Heaven from 1998 to 2000, Gilmore Girls in the 2002–03 season, Smallville in 2003–04, and Reba in 2005–06), under the umbrella subtitle Beginnings. (The WB built on this concept when the Sunday lineup was extended to 5:00 p.m. ET in September 2002, with the two extra hours being occupied by the EasyView block, which offered same-week encores of selected WB primetime shows; this block would carry over, without any branding, to The CW for the successor's first two seasons.)

UPN never regularly programmed Sunday nights, with its only contribution to the night being in early 2001, when it aired lower-tier XFL football games on Sunday evenings during the league's only season in its first iteration. Many of the network's affiliates however, chose to air its weekend encore block (which was conceptually identical to the aforementioned EasyView, debuting in September 2000 in the slot previously held by its UPN Movie Trailer film package) on Sundays, commonly in the prime time or late fringe slots, until the network's closure.

=== Opposite popular annual programming specials ===
Programs such as the Academy Awards (on ABC since 1976), the Super Bowl and the Olympic Games (on NBC at least partially since 1988) have been known to draw so many viewers that almost all efforts to counterprogram against them have failed. As such, broadcasters have traditionally countered these events with either reruns or movies. In past years, seasonal airings of popular classic films such as Gone with the Wind, The Wizard of Oz and The Ten Commandments have also been known to draw sizable audiences. The Super Bowl has historically attracted more unusual fare (such as Animal Planet's Puppy Bowl, a football-themed special featuring puppies at play), with most aiming to counter the halftime show to emulate Fox's success with its live In Living Color special in 1992. However, as all four major commercial networks now have some tie to the National Football League's television deals (current through Super Bowl LXVIII in 2034, with ABC's addition to the rotation under the eleven-year contract agreements signed in 2021 also granting all four networks alternating rights to the championship), major networks have aired little to no new original programming on the night of the Super Bowl under an unsaid gentleman's agreement.

=== Opposite dominant television series ===
On occasion, a regularly scheduled program may have this kind of dominant drawing power. Notable examples have included NBC's Thursday primetime schedule in the 1980s and 1990s that featured The Cosby Show, Seinfeld and ER, The Tonight Show Starring Johnny Carson, and American Idol during its original run's peak on Fox from the mid-2000s to the early 2010s (simultaneous with the peak of reality television in the U.S. during that period) – each of which was dubbed a "Death Star" by the other networks because of their prolonged dominance in the ratings, consistently ranking among the most watched broadcasts in U.S. television history. Many programs that competed against such shows often either flopped or (in the case of an existing series) saw their ratings decline significantly to the brink of cancellation.

== Examples in other countries ==
=== Canada ===
In Canada, federal regulations require television channels and radio stations to carry a certain percentage of programs that are produced in Canada or have some contribution by Canadians. It is common for most privately owned television channels to air the bulk of their mandatory Canadian content in such graveyard slots (especially weekday mornings and Saturday nights), ensuring they can meet their required percentages of Canadian programming while leaving room for more popular foreign programming in other time periods. For over-the-air terrestrial stations, the overnight hours are generally not subject to Canadian content requirements, allowing some opportunity for niche or experimental programming during those hours, although most commonly infomercials air instead. Canadian radio stations have similar practices regarding broadcasts of Canadian music, known pejoratively as the "beaver hour". For the most part in modern times however, Canadian content requirements are filled easily by television stations throughout the week through local newscasts and magazine programming, along with licensed versions of American programs such as the now-defunct ET Canada.

=== Japan ===
Japanese over-the-air stations broadcast late night anime almost exclusively, starting in the late night slot at 11:00 p.m., but bridging the graveyard slot and running until 4:00 a.m.. Because advertising revenue is scant in these time slots, the broadcasts primarily promote DVD versions of their series, which may be longer, uncensored, and/or have added features like commentary tracks, side stories and epilogues. Unlike their American counterparts, the stations are less likely in the late night hours to cater towards late-shift workers or international businesses in Japan with European (3:00 p.m. - 12:30 a.m.) and North American trading days (10:30 p.m. - 5:00 a.m.) or European sports scores (for example, UEFA competitions have 1:00 a.m. and 4:00 a.m. kickoffs, and either 1:00 a.m. hour or 3:00 a.m. hour kickoffs in domestic European competitions).

=== United Kingdom ===
In the UK, overnight is defined as 12.30 to 6.00 a.m.; full-time overnight broadcasting began on ITV in 1987 and 1988 and on Channel 4 at the start of 1997, although into-the-night programming had been a regular fixture on Channel 4 since 1988.

The main BBC channels have never broadcast through the night: BBC One has simulcast the BBC News channel overnight since that service launched in November 1997 (known as BBC News 24 until April 2008), with BBC Two's only foray into continuous television being BBC Learning Zone until that service was discontinued in July 2015. From 2000 to 2013, BBC One repeated recent programmes during this time period with in-vision British Sign Language (BSL) interpretation under the branding "Sign Zone", before simulcasting with BBC News for the rest of the night. Since then, the BBC News simulcast has generally commenced between midnight and 1.00 a.m.. Sign Zone moved to BBC Two in 2013 and they also show This is BBC Two—a barker programme that broadcasts extended promos for BBC Two programmes. Before this, BBC Two, just like BBC One, would often simulcast with the BBC News channel overnight, often until around 4 a.m. when they would show pages from the BBC's teletext service Ceefax with music under the name Pages from Ceefax. Pages From Ceefax ended in the early hours of 22 October 2012 due to Ceefax ceasing operations due to the digital switchover ending analogue transmissions, which Ceefax relied upon. It was then replaced with the aforementioned This is BBC Two.

ITV broadcasts home shopping, repeats of daytime programming and the ambient sound strand Unwind with ITV/STV until 5.05 a.m. weekdays (with Tipping Point following it) and 6.00 a.m. weekends; prior to its launch in 2021, the slot held by Unwind was occupied by ITV Nightscreen, a service that historically provided information on network stars and upcoming shows, but in later years simply offered programme listings for the coming day. Channel 4 shows repeats and films during the overnight hours, while Channel 5 airs Supercasino, some repeats and Teleshopping, and starting in 2025, CBS Sports NFL coverage on most Sunday nights with the 9:00 p.m. (occasionally 9:25 p.m.) matches occasionally reaching into overnight hours if a late game starts at the later time. Most digital channels during this time either go off air or simulcast shopping channels, while some stay on the air.

==== 7.30 p.m. weeknights ====
The 7.30 p.m. half-hour is traditionally the first primetime slot of the evening in the UK. In 1989, ITV began broadcasting a third weekly showing of its highly rated soap opera, Coronation Street, in this slot on Friday evenings, adding to existing episodes in that slot on Mondays and Wednesdays. As ITV's biggest rival, the BBC, broadcast its own biggest soap opera, EastEnders, in the same slot on Tuesdays and Thursdays, this created a situation where the 7.30 slot was effectively "owned" by ITV for three days a week and the BBC for two. With little chance of beating their biggest rival in the ratings, neither network would schedule valuable content in their "off" nights, creating a graveyard slot for that network by default, even though the slot itself was extremely valuable in across-the-board ratings terms. ITV would often use the slot for regional programming, or consumer affairs shows not expected to rate highly, whilst BBC1 would often air repeats. Only on rare occasions did either network break the unwritten agreement not to schedule one show against the other.

During the 2010s and 2020s, the growth of streaming and catch-up TV services made this scheduling pattern less important, and while ITV would still only very rarely schedule Coronation Street against EastEnders, it began scheduling its second highest rating soap opera, Emmerdale, against EastEnders on some occasions (for example, one-hour specials for major storylines). In January 2022, the status quo around the "ownership" of the 7.30 p.m. slot essentially came to an end, with ITV opting to move Coronation Street to 8.00 p.m. and Emmerdale to 7.30 on a permanent basis, in order to facilitate the extension of its evening news bulletin at 6.30. The BBC typically continues to air EastEnders at 7.30 p.m. In January 2026, ITV permanently moved its evening soaps into the 8.00–9.00 p.m. hour on weekdays, freeing the 7.30 p.m. slot, which became filled by various half-hour programming such as quiz shows, current affairs, and also repeats and compilations of daytime staples.

=== Australia and New Zealand ===
In Australia and New Zealand, the overnight daypart runs from midnight until 6:00 a.m. This slot is generally filled by American sitcoms and dramas that failed in their home market but are required to air in some form to justify the network's investment, or archived content, along with teleshopping programmes, and other American programs (mainly lower-tier syndicated newsmagazines, and delayed broadcasts of breakfast television programmes).

== See also ==
- Dayparting
- Prime time – the opposite of graveyard slots

Preceded by Late night television	Television dayparts 2:00 – 5:00 a.m.	Succeeded by Breakfast television
