= Rush Hour (Christopher Lawrence composition) =

2000 single by Christopher Lawrence

Single by Christopher Lawrence

from the album All or Nothing
- B-side: "Ride the Light"
- Released: 2000
- Genre: Progressive trance; electronic
- Length: 7:26 (original mix); 5:50 (album version)
- Label: Hook
- Songwriter: Christopher Lawrence
- Producer: Christopher Lawrence

Christopher Lawrence singles chronology
"Cruise Control" (2000)	"Rush Hour" (2000)	"October's Child" (2002)

"Rush Hour" is an instrumental composition by American DJ Christopher Lawrence. It was released as a 12-inch single in 2000, featuring the song "Ride the Light" as a B-side. A shorter version of "Rush Hour" later appeared on Lawrence's debut studio album, All or Nothing, which was released in 2004. The track peaked at number 118 on the UK Singles Chart. It was also featured on the soundtrack for the video game Need for Speed: Underground 2.

== Track listing ==
- Hook — HK047

Side A
No.	Title	Length
1.	"Rush Hour"	7:26

Side B
No.	Title	Length
1.	"Ride the Light"	6:45

== Charts ==
Chart (2000)	Peak position
UK Singles (Official Charts Company)	118

== Release history ==
Region	Date	Label	Format	Catalogue no.
United Kingdom	2000	Hook	12"	HK047
