= Late-night television =

Block of television programming occurring during the late evening and overnight hours

American TV dayparting; late night television is in shades of green and labelled "Late Fringe" and "Post Late Fringe".

Late-night television is one of the dayparts in television broadcast programming. It follows prime time and precedes the overnight television show graveyard slot. The slot generally runs from about 11:00 p.m. to 2:00 a.m., with variations according to the time zone and broadcaster.

In the United States and Canada, the term is synonymous with the late-night talk show, a type of television comedy talk show and variety show. Thus, the late-night programming block is considered more important in North America. On most major-network stations, a late-night news bulletin airs at the beginning of the block.

Due to the complications of effects of time zones on North American broadcasting, live professional sporting matches such as baseball, hockey, and basketball played in Pacific and Mountain Time Zone cities, such as Denver, Los Angeles, Phoenix, Portland, and Seattle, are often played in the primetime of the Pacific and Mountain Time Zones but late night in the Central and Eastern time zones, and their lateness often contributes to a perceived East Coast bias in sports media.

In the United Kingdom, the late-night spot is from 11:00 p.m. to 12:30 a.m. and not seen as a priority; ITV, Channel 4 and Channel 5 air repeat programs in the time slot, and the BBC's channels (BBC One, Two, Three and Four) primarily show BBC News, air movies, or repeats. Similarly, Australian and New Zealand television primarily air American late shows, lower-priority imported series, late movies or overflows of sports programming in the late-nighttime slot.

On cable television, programming strategies in this time slot include timeshifts of prime-time programs and, in the case of children's television channels, sign off and allowing more adult-oriented fare for the overnight hours under another brand. Two examples are the children's channels Cartoon Network and Nickelodeon, which changes over to Adult Swim and Nick at Nite, respectively, at an hour when most pre-adolescent children go to sleep. Adult Swim and Nick at Nite typically airs series programming, such as reruns of sitcom, that may have coarser language and more adult themes than Cartoon Network and Nickelodeon.

After 11:00 p.m., Japan airs adult talk or variety shows as well as late-night anime. This is also true of the United States–based cable channel Cartoon Network, which targets children and young teens during daytime and primetime hours, but changes over to its Adult Swim brand in late-night slots, which targets young adults with its content.

== See also ==
- Late-night news
- Late-night talk show
- Late-night television in the United States
- List of late-night American network TV programs

Preceded by Prime time	Television dayparts 11:00 p.m. – 2:00 a.m.	Succeeded by Overnight graveyard slot
