= Marathon (media) =

Engagement with media for a long time period

A marathon or watchalong is an event in which viewers or readers engage many hours' worth of media (film, television, books, YouTube videos etc.) in a condensed time period. The phrase has been used to refer to television and movie events since the 1940s. In the modern age of streaming, it has been replaced by the concept of binge-watching, although marathons by definition incorporate other media (not just television) and have lesser negative connotations compared to bingeing.

In the 2014 book Media Marathoning: Immersions in Morality, Lisa Perks describes media marathoning as a "comprehensive and complimentary phrase" that "connotes a conjoined triumph of commitment and stamina. This phrase also captures viewers' or readers' engrossment, effort, and sense of accomplishment surrounding their media interaction." Netflix executive Todd Yellin is quoted as saying "I don't like the term 'binge,' because it sounds almost pathological. 'Marathon' sounds more celebratory."

Media marathons can be organized around particular series, particular artists (e.g., Kurosawa or Hitchcock), or genres (e.g., horror films or chick flicks). Marathons can be user-created: one person decides to undertake a marathon solo or to organize a group marathon. Marathons may also be producer-created. Producer-created marathons are usually orchestrated by movie theaters, fan sites, or by cable channels that show already-run seasons, and, more recently, with original first-run programming through streaming services (such as Netflix's House of Cards). In television, a marathon is an extension of the concept of block programming.

== Reasons ==
The most common reasons for a network to run a marathon are:

1. to celebrate the acquisition of a series,
2. to commemorate the loss of rights to a series
3. to lead into a highly anticipated episode of a series (such as a return from a hiatus or a series finale),
4. likewise to allow viewers to catch up on a series before a season finale or a series finale,
5. to honor the retirement or death of a person associated with the series (this is particularly popular on networks that specialize in reruns),
6. to mark a milestone associated with that series (such as the anniversary of its premiere, or reaching a certain number of episodes)
7. to celebrate (or to take advantage of additional viewers on) a holiday, especially with holiday-themed episodes,
8. to burn off a contract for a television series that has proved unprofitable,
9. to signal the end of a channel format and/or the start of a new one,
10. or to inexpensively counterprogram against more popular programs such as the Super Bowl,

Marathons are attractive to genre movie fans, or families that like watching their favorite movies/TV shows in blocks at a time.

== History ==
Starting in the late 1940s, Journalists began using "marathon" in association with television events, according to archival research by media scholar Emil Steiner. "TV marathon" usages from 1949 to 1959 adhered to these categories: (1) Telethon, (2) Political Stunt/Punditry, (3) Lengthy Oratory, (4) Plus-Sized Show, (5) Plus-Sized Series, and (6) Plus-Sized Programming. “TV marathon” remained associated with live fundraising events through the early 1950s. This remained the most frequent journalistic usage of “marathon” until the 1980s, though the frequency really began falling in 1952, as journalists and style guides began using telethon instead. The portmanteau saved typesetters between two and 10 letters per mention of the most common usage of “television/TV marathon.” While “movie marathon” appeared as early as 1948, journalists did not describe viewing them as “TV marathons.” Even when televised movie marathons began becoming common in the 1970s, journalists modified marathons by the content's original medium. Films and TV shows were separated, and journalists stuck to these six usages. “TV marathon” was used nearly 10 times more frequently than “TV binge” in English language periodicals from 1948 to 2011.

Japanese manga magazine Weekly Shōnen Jump developed a successful formula of publishing individual manga chapters and then compiling them into separate standalone tankōbon volumes that could be "binged" all at once. This Jump formula produced major Japanese pop culture hits such as Dragon Ball (1984 debut), One Piece (1997 debut) and Naruto (1999 debut). According to Matt Alt of The New Yorker, "Jump presaged the way the world consumes streaming entertainment today."

Marathon viewing sessions of Japanese anime television series have been a common trend in anime fandom for decades, dating back to the late 1970s to 1980s. According to an early American anime cosplayer, Karen Schnaubelt, Japanese anime were "incredibly difficult to come by" with "nothing available except broadcast TV until" VHS videotapes became commonly available in the late 1970s, allowing fans to import anime shows from Japan; she noted that a friend "would record the episodes" and then "a group of us would gather at his apartment and watch a marathon of the episodes." At comic conventions and sci-fi conventions in the 1980s, fans brought video tapes to hold marathon anime screenings; BayCon 1986, for example, held an 80-hour long anime marathon.

On broadcast TV, the first TV marathons aired on Nickelodeon's Nick at Nite, on July 1, 1985, presenting multiple episodes from Donna Reed and Route 66. The idea by Alan Goodman and Fred Seibert was based on a similar concept that radio stations used, in which songs by one particular artist would be played for a prolonged period of time.

A marathon may be used by a broadcaster to celebrate its acquisition of a specific series or film franchise (such as FXX's "Every Simpsons Ever" marathon, which celebrated the channel's acquisition of the cable rights to The Simpsons), honor a long-running series before its series finale (such as MTV's Jersey Shore marathon in 2012, and an online marathon of The Daily Show with Jon Stewart held by Comedy Central in 2015, which both featured the series' entire run), celebrate a milestone involving a long-running series, or as a memorial for an entertainer that had recently died. In a few cases, especially with classic television, lost episodes, originally unseen television pilots, and other programming that may not have been seen during the show's original run may be included.

While many marathons were initially considered rare, special events, since the 2010s it has become common for some channels to structure their daily schedules into blocks devoted to specific programs (usually three-to-four hours in length), mainly to appeal to and compete with subscription video-on-demand services (such as Hulu and Netflix) that have enabled voluntary "binge-watching" of television series. Free ad-supported streaming television (FAST) services often carry narrowly formatted linear channels that are devoted specifically to a single television series. Perks attributes the contemporary marathoning trend to three factors: advances in content-delivery technologies, active audience behaviors, and increasing complexity of storytelling.

Almost all marathons primarily feature reruns of episodes already previously broadcast, although one may be used to lead into the premiere of a new episode. To compete with the then-typical practice of streaming services releasing entire seasons of original productions all at once, TBS premiered the entire first season of Angie Tribeca as a marathon, running the 10 episodes on a loop for 25 hours.

== Length ==
Researchers have operationally defined media marathoning and binge-watching in different ways. Perks provides medium-specific definitions. Marathoners must have "viewed a television season in a week or less, watched three or more films from the same series in a week or less, or read three or more books from the same series in a month or less". A Netflix-commissioned study defined "binge-watching" as viewing 2 to 6 episodes of the same show in one sitting. A 2014 TiVo survey defined binge-watching as watching 3 or more episodes of the same show in one day. A marathon generally has to have at least five episodes in a row to be considered as such; as writer Patrick Hipes noted, "some networks (promote) 3–4 episodes as a 'marathon,' but that's more like a 5K."

Some of the longest-running marathons are the two Twilight Zone marathons that air on Syfy in the United States on New Year's Day and Independence Day; not counting early-morning infomercials, each run for roughly three days straight. Holidays are a common time for marathons; for instance, on Thanksgiving in 2010, over 40 cable networks aired marathons of various lengths.

For a time, the longest continuous marathon in the history of television was a twelve-day marathon of The Simpsons that aired on FXX, which aired non-stop from August 21, 2014, until September 2, 2014. The marathon featured the first 552 episodes of the series (every single episode that had already been released at the time) aired chronologically, including The Simpsons Movie, which FX Networks had already owned the rights to air. The first day of the marathon was the highest-rated broadcast day in the history of the network so far, the ratings more than tripled those of regular prime-time programming for FXX. Ratings during the first six nights of the marathon grew night after night, with the network ranking within the top 5 networks in basic cable each night.

The record was surpassed in 2015 by VH1 Classic, which broadcast a nineteen-day marathon of Saturday Night Live from January 28 to February 15, in honour of the program's 40th season (with its end date coinciding with the 40th-anniversary special episode on NBC). The marathon primarily featured the series' most notable episodes in a reverse chronological order (beginning with season 39 and concluding with its October 11, 1975 series premiere), along with blocks focusing on specific celebrities (such as Eddie Murphy and Justin Timberlake), a block of the program's retrospective episodes on February 15, as well as Saturday-night airings of films featuring alumni of the series (such as Black Sheep and Wayne's World).

== Venue ==
Movie marathons may be hosted in a private residence or in movie theaters. One guide for hosting them notes that viewers should be able to come and go as they please.

== Food ==
Some marathons offer story-specific food choices, such as lembas and butterbeer.

Popcorn is considered a staple for movie marathons. Some people prefer to provide multiple flavors of popcorn, while others prefer to provide plain popcorn and flavoring separate so that participants can flavor it themselves.

== See also ==
- Binge-watching
- Doubleheader (television)
- Omnibus (broadcast)
- Telethon
