= Burning off =

Airing of a program as filler instead of in a regular way

In American broadcast programming, "burning off" is the custom of quickly airing the remaining episodes of a television program, usually one that has already been or is planned to be cancelled, without the intent to attract a large number of viewers. In addition to airing episodes two at a time, this process may also include rescheduling the show to a lower-rated time slot, or transferring the show to a less visible sister network. A low-rated show that premiered in the early portion of the regular television season may return during the summer, only to have the final episodes "burned off."

Abandoned programs may be burned off for a number of reasons:

- The program must air to meet contractual or legal requirements.
- The production company needs enough first-run episodes to meet minimum requirements for broadcast syndication (though with the rise of streaming video platforms, this has become less of a concern).
- Their use as "filler" is perceived as slightly more profitable than reruns or other fillers.

== Burn-off definition ==
Up through the 1990s, contractual obligations often meant the airing of pilots for shows that were not going to be picked up, such as The Art of Being Nick, Poochinski, Heart and Soul, and Barney Miller, usually during the summer months to provide some form of 'new' programming in the technical sense of the word. In a few cases, the pilot may prove popular enough that a series is eventually commissioned; such was the case with Barney Miller and The Seinfeld Chronicles, the latter of which led to the long-running sitcom Seinfeld. Anthology series such as Love, American Style were devoted to many such failed pilots, most famously Garry Marshall's failed pilot, "New Family in Town", which was rebranded "Love and the Television Set" when aired as an episode of Love American Style; ABC ultimately changed its mind after all and picked up the series as Happy Days.

The term can also apply to programming agreements or network affiliations where the ratings strength and programming quality of a network or syndicated program declines to a point where its existence can harm a station or cable channel's further existence. For instance, MyNetworkTV, which launched in 2006 with the intention of being a broadcast network with the same programming strength of its most direct competitor The CW, has declined to a syndication service carrying nightly rerun blocks of syndicated programming which themselves are already widely aired otherwise on other cable channels, broadcast networks and streaming services. Because of this, many stations have pushed its programming to the graveyard slot due to its lack of viability or even another digital subchannel. Thus, the service is being 'burned off' in a timeslot where it cannot cause further harm to the station's schedule, with the service's affiliates merely using the "My" branding assets for their visual identity, or not at all.

Burning off shows was more common on the main broadcast networks before reality television, when that format became a cultural phenomenon in the summer of 2000. While new episodes of canceled shows would often earn decent ratings (by summer standards) compared to repeats of established shows, CBS's results in that with a successful reality show in Big Brother and a massive blockbuster in Survivor led to a turn towards other less-expensive new reality-TV episodes during the summer and away from bothering to air burn-off products at all. The arc of the last 20+ years (since around 2002) has been for canceled shows to have unaired episodes air in one of three locations: an affiliated cable network (the final episodes of Freaks and Geeks were shown this way), a DVD release of the show (which was not that common for most of these unsuccessful shows but did happen sometimes), and/or on a network or conglomerate's streaming portal.

Outside series with universal negative reception or other external issues, the phenomenon has become rare as of the late 2010s, with networks and services more apt to air the entire series run, or through another venue to ensure the entire work will air as originally intended. It also does not apply to series where a lead actor, producer, or writer died suddenly, and the network and the show's personnel agreed mutually to end the series, airing the final produced and completed episodes as a tribute to their departed colleague.

== Examples ==
Individual entertainers who had signed to expensive contracts with a network but experienced diminishing returns early on in the contract would often have their contracts burnt off by having them appear in guest spots on variety shows and other low-priority projects. Milton Berle, known as "Mr. Television" from being one of the medium's first stars, was tied into a deal with NBC which was nearly a lifetime contract (only ending in 1981), but by 1960, his star power had faded so dramatically that he had been reduced to hosting a bowling show to burn off the contract. This, too, failed, and Berle was released from his contract in 1961. Paul Lynde had signed a similar, shorter-term agreement with ABC, but after the failures of The Paul Lynde Show and ABC's efforts to shoehorn him into Temperatures Rising, Lynde was reduced to occasional specials (such as The Paul Lynde Halloween Special) and guest spots on other shows such as Donny & Marie; although Lynde found some success with the specials, his uncooperative behavior led to him being fired in 1978.

After Jackie Gleason's 1961 panel game for CBS, You're in the Picture, was met with dismal reception, the following week's "episode" famously featured Gleason delivering a self-deprecating monologue as an "apology" for the preceding week's program. The remaining commitment to the timeslot was burned off as the talk show The Jackie Gleason Show.

The Drew Carey Show followed its very successful first seven seasons on ABC with two seasons that fell heavily into burning-off territory. The show premiered during the start of the 2002–03 slate for its eighth season, but declining ratings led ABC to pull the show after its 14th episode in late January 2003, and the remaining twelve season eight episodes did not air until that summer. ABC pressured Warner Bros. TV to agree to a settlement to cancel the show before the ninth season, but after WBTV threatened a breach of contract lawsuit, they simply aired all of the episodes during the summer of 2004. Many of those episodes were aired out of production order and, until the few shows up to and including the series finale, had zero promotional backing on ABC.

In 2005, after facing insurmountable competition from the revival of Doctor Who, ITV burned off its professional wrestling-themed game show Celebrity Wrestling in a Sunday-morning timeslot.

Recent examples of summer burn-offs include Fox's Sons of Tucson (2010), the NBC medical/fantasy drama Do No Harm (2013), the NBC sitcom Save Me (2013), and the ABC sitcom United We Fall (2020; it had originally been slated for a midseason premiere that was delayed to fall 2020 due to the COVID-19 pandemic, before ultimately being pushed ahead to July and being cancelled after a single season).

During the 2009–10 season, Fox aired 37 first-run episodes of the sitcom 'Til Death—22 season four episodes and 15 unaired episodes from season three. The series had been renewed for a fourth season only after Sony Pictures Television offered Fox a discount on the licensing fee in order to get enough episodes aired to compile a saleable syndication package. Several episodes of the series were burned off in unusual time slots, including: four episodes in a Christmas Day "marathon", two episodes being aired against Super Bowl XLIV, and three unaired third-season episodes being broadcast in June after the fourth season (and series) finale had already aired in May. The series' continuity also shifted throughout the season, as episodes were often aired out of order, leading to a situation where Allison Stark (the daughter of the main characters) was re-cast four times throughout its history and would have a different actress playing the character from episode to episode, eventually becoming a fourth wall-breaking running gag.

In March 2014, the A&E series Those Who Kill was moved to Lifetime Movie Network (LMN) after A&E canceled the show following two low-rated episodes.

In late December 2018, TBS debuted the entire fourth season of its comedy series Angie Tribeca over the course of two days. The series was subsequently cancelled on May 9, 2019. By that time, a number of cast members had already moved on to other projects.

== See also ==
- Graveyard slot and Friday night death slot – time periods with low television viewership
- Ashcan copy – comic books created to secure trademarks to titles rather than for popular distribution
- Filler (media) – material of lower cost or quality that is used to fill a certain television time slot or physical medium, such as a musical album
