= Frank P. Tomasulo =

Frank P. Tomasulo is an American film critic, theoretician, and historian. He received a B.A. in philosophy from Brooklyn College, his M.A. in cinema studies at New York University, and his Ph.D. in film and television from UCLA. He served as editor of the Journal of Film and Video from 1991 to 1996 and Cinema Journal from 1997 to 2002.

He has published widely on Hollywood and international cinema, American television, and screen acting. He has been a longtime advocate for the modernist cinema and an outspoken critic of the early movies of American director Steven Spielberg. His anthology on film performance, More than a Method, was co-edited with Diane Carson and Cynthia Baron. (Nominated for the 2005 Theatre Library Association Book Award) Tomasulo's book-length monograph, Michelangelo Antonioni: Ambiguity in the Modernist Cinema, was published in 2019.

Tomasulo has taught a wide variety of film history, theory, production, and screenwriting classes at UCLA, Ithaca College, Cornell University, the University of California–Santa Cruz, Georgia State University, Southern Methodist University, and Florida State University, as well as being an academic administrator. More recently, he has taught independent film and other cinema courses at The City College of New York, City University of New York and Hunter College and Hofstra University; television history and criticism at Sarah Lawrence College; and cinema history and genre film classes at Pace University. In addition, Tomasulo was Core Certified Professor of Film at National University, where he taught on-line graduate seminars on Silent Cinema, American Film History, Italian Cinema, The Horror Film, and other topics.

In 2009, Tomasulo became the first recipient of the University Film and Video Association (UFVA) Teaching Excellence Award; and in 2020 he was awarded the UFVA Teaching Excellence Award for Adjunct Instructors. He has also won a number of other pedagogical awards at Georgia State University, Ithaca College, and elsewhere. His scholarly writing has been recognized with awards from the Society for Cinema and Media Studies (SCMS), the University Film and Video Association, and Ithaca College, among other institutions and organizations.
