= Fred Taylor =

Frederick, Frederic or Fred Taylor may refer to:

== Sports ==
=== Association football (soccer) ===
- Fred Taylor (footballer, born 1877), English football player for Grimsby Town
- Fred Taylor (footballer, born 1884) (1884–1954), English football player for Chelsea
- Fred Taylor (footballer, born 1890) (1890–?), English football player for Hull City and Southampton
- Freddy Taylor (footballer) (1920–1983), English football player for Burnley and New Brighton

=== Other sports ===
- Fred Taylor (running back) (born 1976), American football running back
- Fred Taylor (American football coach) (1920–2013), American college football coach at Texas Christian University
- Fred Taylor (Australian footballer) (1918–1991), Australian rules footballer for St Kilda
- Fred Taylor (sprinter) (born 1957), American former sprinter
- Fred Taylor (basketball, born 1924) (1924–2002), American college basketball coach at Ohio State University
- Fred Taylor (basketball, born 1948), American former NBA player
- Fred Taylor (cyclist) (1890–1968), American Olympic cyclist
- Frederick Taylor, known as Cyclone Taylor (1884–1979), Canadian ice hockey forward
- Frederick Winslow Taylor (1856–1915), American engineer and management consultant (also a tennis champion and Olympian golfer)
- Fred Taylor (cricketer) (1891–1968), English cricketer
- Frederick Taylor (cricketer) (1916–1999), English cricketer

== Other ==
- Frederick Taylor (colonist) (1810–1872), English colonial property manager, perpetrator of the Murdering Gully massacre
- Fred M. Taylor (1855–1932), American economist
- Fredrick Monroe Taylor (1901–1988), American attorney, federal judge in Idaho
- Frederick Winslow Taylor (1856–1915), American engineer and management consultant (also a tennis champion and Olympian golfer)
- Fred Taylor (Pennsylvania politician) (1931–2015), Pennsylvania politician
- Frederick Taylor (historian) (born 1947), British historian
- Frederick Howard Taylor (1862–1946), British pioneer Protestant Christian missionary to China
- Frederick Southgate Taylor (1847–1896), American businessman, politician and founder of Pi Kappa Alpha fraternity
- Frederick W. Taylor (bishop) (1853–1903), bishop of the Episcopal Diocese of Quincy
- Fred Taylor (physicist) (1944–2021), atmospheric physicist and planetary scientist, Halley Professor at Oxford University
- Fred Barney Taylor (born 1948), American independent filmmaker
- Sir Frederick Taylor, 1st Baronet (1847–1920), British physician
- Freddy Taylor (musician), American jazz singer, trumpeter, dancer, and bandleader
- Frederick Charles Taylor (1907–1961), Canadian politician
- Frederick Lewis Taylor (1892–1961), English Benedictine abbot

== See also ==
- Frederick Taylor University, an institution in California, USA
- Frederick Taylor International University, a defunct unaccredited institution
- Frederick Williams-Taylor (1863–1945), Canadian banker
- Frederick Tayler (1889–1954), English cricketer
