= Amy Villarejo =

American academic and writer

Chair at the Department of (FTVDM) Amy Villarejo
- Born: Los Angeles and Davis, California
- Occupations: Chair and Professor, Film, Television, and Digital Media

Academic work
- Discipline: feminist, queer media, critical theory, and television studies

Amy Villarejo is an American scholar in cinema and media studies, specializing in feminist and queer media, critical theory, and television studies. She is currently chair of the Department of Film, Television, and Digital Media (FTVDM) and professor at the University of California, Los Angeles (UCLA). Previously, she was the Frederic J. Whiton Professor of Humanities at Cornell University, where she taught in the Department of Performing and Media Arts and the Department of Comparative Literature.

Her notable works include Lesbian Rule: Cultural Criticism and the Value of Desire (Duke University Press, 2003), which won the Katherine Singer Kovács Prize from the Society for Cinema and Media Studies.

== Early life and education ==
Villarejo was born and raised in Los Angeles and Davis, California. She earned her A.B. degree from Bryn Mawr College and later received her M.A. and Ph.D. in Cinema Studies with distinction from the University of Pittsburgh.

== Career ==
Villarejo joined the faculty of Cornell University in 1997, where she taught for more than two decades. During her tenure at Cornell, she held several leadership roles, including Director of the Women’s Studies Program (later Feminist, Gender & Sexuality Studies), Chair of the Department of Performing and Media Arts, and Inaugural Director of the Milstein Program in Technology and Humanity. She also held a joint appointment in the Department of Comparative Literature.

In 2020, Villarejo joined UCLA’s School of Theater, Film & Television as a Professor in the Department of Film, Television, and Digital Media. She served as Chair of the department from 2022 to 2025. In addition to her primary appointments, she has held visiting positions at institutions including the University of São Paulo, the University of Sydney, Northwestern University, and Justus Liebig University Giessen.

Villarejo has participated extensively in international academic collaboration, including faculty roles in summer seminars and research programs in China, Germany, and Australia. She is currently Professor Emerita at Cornell University.

== Research and scholarly work ==
Amy Villarejo’s scholarship encompasses a wide range of topics within cinema and media studies, including queer theory, feminist media studies, critical theory, and television studies. Her work is recognized for its historical depth, theoretical sophistication, and interdisciplinary approach, addressing both the cultural politics of media representation and the institutional contexts that shape media forms and practices. Villarejo’s research spans film, television, documentary media, and global cinema, with particular attention to how gender, sexuality, and historicity intersect with media production, distribution, and reception. Her work also engages with Third Cinema, Brazilian and Indian cinema, and American television, reflecting her broad critical interests.

Her book Ethereal Queer: Television, Historicity, Desire (2013) offers a historically engaged analysis of queer representations on television, challenging assumptions about the timeline and social significance of queer visibility in broadcast and digital media. The work draws on archival research and theoretical insights to trace queer television’s evolution from early broadcast eras to contemporary streaming cultures, demonstrating the medium’s persistent engagement with diverse forms of queer life.

Villarejo co-edited The Oxford Handbook of Queer Cinema (2021)with Ron Gregg, that maps the field of queer cinema globally, across silent, classical, and contemporary film histories, and explores methodologies, archives, and pedagogical frameworks in queer film studies.

Her earlier monograph Lesbian Rule: Cultural Criticism and the Value of Desire (2003) received the Katherine Singer Kovács Book Award from the Society for Cinema and Media Studies, highlighting its impact in feminist and queer critical theory.

Other book publications include a co-authored study (with Marcia Landy) in the BFI Film Classics series on Greta Garbo’s 1933 film Queen Christina, a co-edited volume (with Jordy Rosenberg) on Marxism and queer studies, a co-edited collection (with Matthew Tinkcom) of essays on film and cultural studies, and two widely-used textbooks: Film Studies, The Basics, now in its third edition, and (with Glyn Davis, Kay Dickinson, and Lisa Patti) Film Studies: A Global Introduction, contracted for a second edition in 2026.

== Editorial and professional contributions ==
Villarejo’s research articles and essays have appeared in peer-reviewed journals such as Film Quarterly, GLQ: A Journal of Lesbian and Gay Studies, Social Text, New German Critique, and Cinema Journal (now Journal of Cinema and Media Studies). She has also contributed chapters to edited collections and has served on editorial boards for Film Quarterly and JCMS, reflecting her ongoing influence in shaping scholarly conversations in media studies. Villarejo also serves on the editorial boards of Film Quarterly and the Journal of Cinema and Media Studies (JCMS). Her editorial work continues to influence the field of media studies.

== Publications ==
- Lesbian Rule: Cultural Criticism and the Value of Desire (Duke University Press, 2003) – Winner of the Katherine Singer Kovács Book Award.
- Ethereal Queer: Television, Historicity, Desire (Duke University Press, 2013).
- Film Studies: The Basics (Routledge, 2013; 3rd edition, 2021).
- Co-editor of The Oxford Handbook of Queer Cinema (Oxford University Press, 2021) with Ron Gregg.

Villarejo has authored more than 50 essays published in peer-reviewed journals and anthologies, including New German Critique, Social Text, GLQ: A Journal of Lesbian and Gay Studies, Film Quarterly, and Cinema Journal (now Journal of Cinema and Media Studies).

== Awards and honors ==
- Katherine Singer Kovács Book Award for Lesbian Rule: Cultural Criticism and the Value of Desire (2003).

Villarejo has also received numerous awards and fellowships recognizing her contributions to scholarship and teaching. These include the Morgan Chia-Wen Sze and Bobbi Josephine Hernandez Distinguished Teaching Prize, multiple grants from the Society for the Humanities at Cornell, and international research fellowships.
