= Television studies =

Academic discipline focused on television

Television studies is an academic discipline that deals with critical approaches to television. Usually, it is distinguished from mass communication research, which tends to approach the topic from a social sciences perspective. Defining the field is problematic; some institutions and syllabuses do not distinguish it from media studies or classify it as a subfield of popular culture studies.

One form of television studies is roughly equivalent to the longer-standing discipline of film studies in that it is often concerned with textual analysis yet other approaches center more on the social functions of television. For example, analyses of quality television, such as Cathy Come Home and Twin Peaks, have attracted the interests of researchers for their cinematic qualities. However, television studies can also incorporate the study of television viewing and how audiences make meaning from texts, which is commonly known as audience theory or reception theory.

== History ==
Charlotte Brunsdon argues that television studies is an "aspirationally disciplinary name given to the academic study of television." Since it is a relatively new discipline, Brunsdon notes that "...many of the key television scholars are employed in departments of sociology, politics, communication arts, speech, theatre, media and film studies." She argues that television studies developed during the 1970s and 1980s "...from three major bodies of commentary on television: journalism, literary/dramatic criticism and the social sciences." Critical methods for television have been "...extrapolated from traditional literary and dramatic criticism." Horace Newcomb argues that television studies scholars often need to justify their academic focus: "[T]he mere suggestion that television needs analysis itself requires supportive argument."

As a result, television studies is marked by a great deal of "disciplinary hybridity." Perhaps because television scholars are approaching the subject from so many different disciplinary and theoretical perspectives, there are many debates about how television should be understood and conceptualized from a political and methodological point of view. Another impact of the disciplinary hybridity is the diversity in the types of studies carried out. Early television studies included histories of television, biographies of television producers, archival research by historians, and sociological studies of the role the television set played in 1950s homes.

In television studies, television and other mass media forms are "...conceptualised within frameworks" such as "...ownership; national and international regulation of media production and distribution; professional ideologies; public opinion; [and] media audiences." As the field of television studies was being developed, it was influenced by the medium's longstanding issue of invoking "distrust, fear and contempt", as a purported cause of social ills. As well, television scholars had to prove that television was different from other "mass media", often by pointing to how television differed from radio and cinema.

In the 1970s and 1980s, television studies developed three strands of commentary:

- A journalistic approach, which reviews recent television programs
- A literary and dramatic criticism approach, which examines the television screenwriter in the same way that literary and dramatic criticism examines novels and plays
- A social science approach, which examines production and distribution, and the function of television in society.

The social science stream examined the social function and effects of television and analyzed the role that television plays in the social order and the public sphere. Some television scholars applied Marxist frameworks or the "critical sociology of the Frankfurt School". Since the 1970s, feminist television scholars have focused "... on programmes for women and those which have key female protagonists", such as Julie D'Acci's study of the police drama Cagney and Lacey and the "...now substantial literature on soap opera." Television studies in the 1990s includes "work on the definition and interpretation of the television text and the new media ethnographies of viewing" and histories of "production studies" - how television shows are developed, financed, and produced.

While some predicted the end of television (or at least of the broadcast TV), some scholars claim that television "has never been so healthy and triumphant as nowadays".

== Television scholars ==
Scholars who principally work in television studies include:

- Beth Johnson
- Ien Ang
- Jeremy G. Butler
- John Ellis
- Jane Feuer
- John Fiske
- John Hartley
- Henry Jenkins
- Amanda D. Lotz
- Toby Miller
- Jason Mittell
- Horace Newcomb
- Neil Postman
- Lynn Spigel
- Raymond Williams

== See also ==
- B-television
- Four Arguments for the Elimination of Television
- Media psychology
- Quality television
- Social aspects of television
- Telephilia
- Television production
- The A.V. Club
- Theatre studies

=== Museums ===
- The Paley Center for Media in New York City and Los Angeles

=== Journals ===
The following journals are either devoted to television studies or, at the least, frequently include TV-studies essays.

- Journal of Cinema and Media Studies — published by the Society for Cinema and Media Studies.
- Critical Studies in Television: Scholarly Studies in Small Screen Fictions — a print journal and online research resource, published by Manchester University Press.
- Flow — an online journal of television and media studies published biweekly by the Department of Radio-TV-Film at the University of Texas at Austin.
- Historical Journal of Film, Radio and Television — journal of The International Association for Media and History
- Journal of Film and Video — published by the University Film and Video Association.
- Jump Cut — review of contemporary media.
- Media Industries Journal — peer-reviewed and open-access.
- New Review of Film and Television Studies — edited by Warren Buckland at Oxford Brookes University, UK
- Screen — film and TV journal, particularly influential during the 1970s and 1980s.
- The Velvet Light Trap — long-running film and media journal.
