= Fred Barney Taylor =

American independent filmmaker (born 1948)

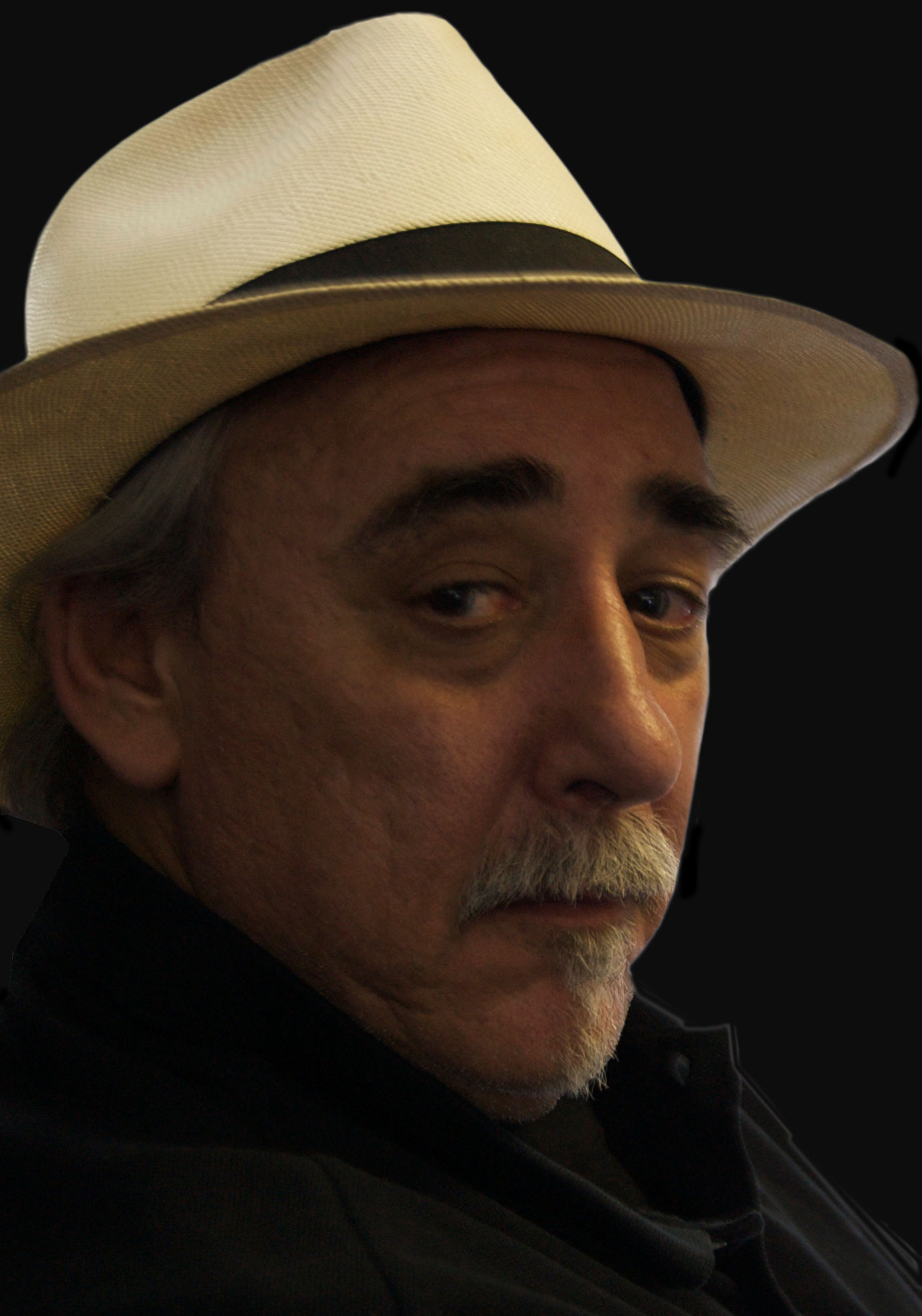
- Fred Barney Taylor, 2010
- Born: August 25, 1948 (age 78)
- Occupation: Filmmaker

Fred Barney Taylor (born August 25, 1948) is an American independent filmmaker. He is best known for directing the award-winning documentary The Polymath or, The Life and Opinions of Samuel R. Delany, Gentleman, which premiered at the 2007 Tribeca Film Festival.

== Early life and career ==
Fred Barney Taylor was born and raised in South Orange, New Jersey, the only son of a middle-class Jewish couple. After graduating from Columbia High School, Maplewood, he attended Northwestern University where he obtained a Bachelor of Science in Journalism (BSJ) from the Medill School of Journalism, prior to earning an MA in Communication Arts (Film-making) and an MFA in Film/Art from the University of Wisconsin–Madison. His film-making career began at around that time with "The Structuralist Films of David Rimmer" (1972), a 13-minute experimental short featuring a dog catching a frisbee. The film was shot in Super 8 and blown up to 16m on a home-made optical printer. It was also slowed down to 3 frames per second and the celluloid was purposefully bleached. Taylor adds: "The film has sadly been lost. There were only two copies. I lost one of them and I lent the other to Peter Greenaway. This is a pity as he really liked it.”

Taylor's 1982 film Los Hijos de Sandino (The Children of Sandino) was also shot in Super 8 and blown up to 16mm. In Show Us Life Chuck Kleinhans said: "The film presents the poetry of the revolution; that is the part of the total picture never captured in maps, charts and the official talking-head interviews with officials." It was an award winner at the Global Village Documentary Festival, New York City, 1983 and was an invited participant at festivals in Havana, Edinburgh, Milan, and Mexico City.

Taylor shot The Architecture of Rhythm (1989) on location in West Africa, the Caribbean, and Brazil. Sections of the film were selected for the Distant Lives series co-produced by PBS and the Learning Channel, and broadcast nationally.

He was an annual visiting professor from 1993 to 1999 at Michigan State University where he created, designed and taught production courses in Great Britain and Mexico for the MSU Study Abroad program. He was a Senior Faculty Member at the School of Visual Arts in New York City from 1988 to 1999 with the roles of senior production instructor and thesis advisor. He founded and taught (from 1982 to 1986) at the New York International Media Group, an instructional workshop devoted to small format videography and filmmaking, 1982–1986. Regarding his teaching career, Taylor says his most memorable experience was "When I tried to re-enact the famous criminology stunt in which, during the middle of a class an assailant walks in, shoots the professor and flees the crime scene. The professor then stands up (the gun, bullets and blood were all fake) and asks the class to describe the assailant. There are usually as many different descriptions as there are students in the class. I first saw this technique being used in class when I was student at Medill in 1966. 10 years later I was teaching a course at Grand Valley State in Grand Rapids, Michigan and I thought I’d try it out, but let’s say that the reaction was different from that in Chicago. I hadn’t even got up from the floor when the Campus police arrived. They wanted to arrest my assassin, but he had already fled!"

Between 1999 and 2001, Taylor directed Great Writers/Great Cities for the Travel Channel. In four 60-minute films, the series showcased cities seen through the eyes of contemporary writers. Episodes included: Paco Taibo's Mexico City, narrated by Edward James Olmos; Iain Sinclair's London; Carl Hiaasen: From Miami to Key West with music and narration by Warren Zevon and New York Underground, with Lucy Sante, Samuel R. Delany, David Rieff, and Fran Lebowitz.

Taylor's film, Atlantis (2006), "a tantalizing treatment of the Brooklyn Bridge" was shot in High-Definition for the HD Lab of Rainbow Media's VOOM Channel, It was broadcast in December, 2006 and was part of the Official Selection at the 2007 New York Video Festival and was screened at Pacific Film Archives in 2008.

In 2007 Taylor directed The Polymath or, The Life and Opinions of Samuel R. Delany, Gentleman. It was voted Best Documentary Feature at the 2008 Philadelphia International Gay and Lesbian Film Festival and was an official selection of the 2008 International Festival of Films on Art, Montreal, London International LGFF, Frameline (San Francisco GLFF), Outfest (Los Angeles GLFF), Reeling (Chicago International GLFF), and Seattle GLFF. The film received positive critical reception. The New Yorker said: "Taylor's understated direction, featuring simple images that prod Delany's recollections gently along, makes the film a lively and thoughtful look at a deeply lived-in life." Writing in Jump Cut, Nicholas de Villiers described the film as "a double portrait. It is at once an affectionate portrayal of the prolific science fiction author and cultural critic known to his friends as “Chip" and a picture of New York City's changing queer sexual landscape," adding that: "Taylor's film illustrates Delany's life through a series of what Roland Barthes called biographemes (preferences, inflections, details to which the author might be distilled)."

Taylor's next film, Lethem, a portrait of the life and work of Jonathan Lethem, a MacArthur "Genius Grant"-winning novelist, essayist, and short story writer premiered at the Metrograph in 2017. The film features Lethem's oldest friend, Michael Seidenberg, a bookseller whose bookshops were stocked with books that he would rather not sell; his younger brother, Blake, a legendary graffiti writer; his father, Richard Brown Lethem, a well-known painter; and his good friend Hampton Fancher, the screenwriter of Blade Runner and Blade Runner 2049. Lethem was an invited participant at the 2018 Houston Cinema Arts Festival.

Taylor is currently the owner and director of Maestromedia Productions in New York City. He has produced most of the films he has directed: "I’ve never really had a producer, nor an agent, for that matter.”

Taylor's complete works are archived at the Wisconsin Center for Film and Theater Research at the University of Wisconsin-Madison, his graduate school alma mater.

== Filmography ==
- The Structuralist Films of David Rimmer (1972)
- Lives of the Artists (1982)
- Los Hijos de Sandino (The Children of Sandino) (1982)
- The Architecture of Rhythm (1989)
- The Way of the People (1992), Commissioned by the National Museum of the American Indian, for the Smithsonian Institution
- Mondo Miami (1995)
- The NMAI Today (1997), Commissioned by the National Museum of the American Indian, for the Smithsonian Institution
- Four Acts in Glass, Produced by the American Craft Museum, New York (1997)
- Conversations with Myself (1998)
- Great Writers/Great Cities (1999–2000): Paco Taibo's Mexico City"; Iain Sinclair's London"; Carl Hiaasen: From Miami to Key West"; New York Underground, with Luc Sante, Samuel R. Delany, David Rieff, and Fran Lebowitz"
- Las Vegas Exposed (2002–2003)
- Vegas Around the World (2002–2003)
- The Gates (2005)
- Atlantis (2006)
- The Polymath or, The Life and Opinions of Samuel R. Delany, Gentleman (2007)
- Lethem (2017)

== Personal life ==
Taylor resides in Newark, New Jersey, with his wife Lynn, whom he married in 1991. They have one daughter, Francesca.
