= Caper in the Castro =

1989 video game

- Floppy disk for the original version; the edited re-release's label is identical save for its title.
- Developer: C.M. Ralph
- Platform: Mac OS
- Release: 1989
- Genre: Point-and-click adventure
- Mode: Single-player

Caper in the Castro is a murder mystery video game developed by C.M. Ralph and released in 1989. It is the earliest known computer game to focus on LGBT themes. The game was originally released for Mac computers and distributed freely on bulletin board systems as charityware to raise money for the AIDS epidemic.

== Gameplay ==
Caper in the Castro is a single-player point-and-click game. The player takes on the role of Tracker McDyke, a lesbian private detective, who must find her kidnapped friend and drag queen, Tessy LaFemme. To accomplish this, the player examines various locations on Castro Street to search for information on LaFemme's disappearance. The setting is based on the historically gay San Francisco neighborhood, the Castro.

== Development and history ==
Caper in the Castro was developed with the Mac HyperCard and the original game description file says that it was created over the course of 6 months. C.M. Ralph has stated that they worked on it outside of their full-time job in Silicon Valley. In interviews, they have mentioned that they were inspired to create the game so they could give back to the LGBT community.

In 1988 I had moved from Southern California (behind the orange curtain) to the San Francisco Bay Area. I was so impressed and grateful for the freedom of the LBGT community here as compared to what I had lived in down in SoCal. I wanted to give back to the community and also create a way to raise money for AIDS Charities.

— C.M. Ralph, Interview in Paste

Ralph made the game as charityware and asked for people to donate to an AIDS charity of their choice instead of paying for the game. In this way, it was one of the only games in the 1980s and 1990s to directly reference HIV/AIDS. The game was distributed freely over bulletin board systems (BBS), which allowed programs and information to be shared between computers using telephone lines. These systems provided a way for diverse communities to network easily. The game was specifically shared on the LGBT BBS.

In 1989, C.M. Ralph released an alternative version of the game called Murder on Mainstreet for commercial sale. This version swapped out the main characters' names and other details to exclude LGBT themes, so that they could sell it to a publisher that might not have been interested in an LGBT-related game. Heizer Software sold this version of the game in mail-order catalogs.

From 2014 to 2017, the game was thought to be lost because there were no known floppy disk copies left, and since the game was distributed through BBS, it was unlikely any copies would have survived. However, in 2017, C.M. Ralph found original floppy disks of both Caper in the Castro and Murder on Mainstreet while in the process of moving. Adrienne Shaw, the director of the LGBTQ Video Game Archive, reached out to The Strong National Museum of Play to find a way to access the data on the floppy disks. From there, Andrew Borman, the Digital Games Curator at The Strong, came up with a solution to access the game. In 2017, playable versions of both Caper in the Castro and Murder on Mainstreet were hosted online through the Internet Archive. In 2019, the game was exhibited at Schwules Museum in Berlin, during the Rainbow Arcade, the first exhibit on the history of LGBTQ video games.
