= Forbidden Fruit (2000 film) =

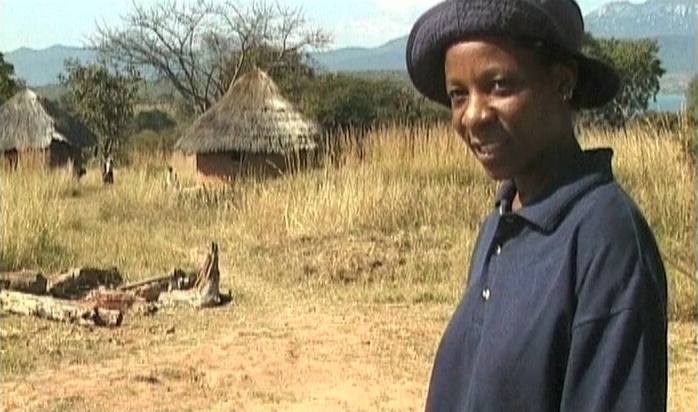
- Directed by: Sue Maluwa-Bruce, Beate Kunath, Yvonne Zückmantel
- Written by: Sue Maluwa-Bruce, Beate Kunath, Yvonne Zückmantel
- Cinematography: Beate Kunath
- Edited by: Beate Kunath
- Release date: 2000
- Running time: 30 minutes
- Countries: Germany; Zimbabwe
- Languages: English; Shona

Forbidden Fruit is a 2000 German/Zimbabwean short film written and directed by Sue Maluwa-Bruce, Beate Kunath and Yvonne Zückmantel. Filmed in Zimbabwe, the film depicts the romantic relationship between two women, and the aftermath of the discovery of their relationship.

== Plot ==
In a rural village in Zimbabwe, a single woman, Nongoma, and her married neighbour, Tsitsi, fall in love. When their lesbian relationship is discovered, Nongoma flees to the city. When they are reunited by chance two years later, the women decide to move together to a village where nobody knows them.

== Production ==
Forbidden Fruit was filmed on location in Mutare, Zimbabwe. When the original cast members resigned fearing a homophobic backlash, Maluwa-Bruce recruited friends and family members to act in the film.

== Reception ==
Forbidden Fruit won the Teddy Jury Award at the 2001 Berlin International Film Festival and the FEMMEDIA Prize for Best Short at the Identities Queer Film Festival in Vienna. It received a Special Jury Mention at the Lesbian & Gay Film Festival in Milan.

Nicole Blizzard of Technodyke called the film wonderful and Amy Villarejo of Cornell University called it "a moving call to queer, global solidarity". PlanetOut called it "the most gutsy film to be shown at the Berlinale". Daniel Somerville said "it may not be the best film ever made but it certainly breaks ground in a Zimbabwean context."
