= Bo Ruberg =

American game studies scholar

- Awards: Israel Fishman Non-Fiction Stonewall Book Award (2021), SCMS Anne Friedberg Innovative Scholarship Award (2022)

Academic background
- Education: University of California Berkeley

Academic work
- Institutions: University of California Irvine
- Main interests: video games, Queer theory, Cultural Studies
- Notable works: Video Games Have Always Been Queer (2019), The Queer Games Avant-Garde (2020), Sex Dolls at Sea: Imagined Histories of Sexual Technologies (2022)

Bo Ruberg (born 1985) is an American game studies scholar and professor at the University of California, Irvine in the department of Film and Media Studies. They are known for their work on queer theory and video games. They are the author of Video Games Have Always Been Queer, The Queer Games Avant-Garde, and Sex Dolls at Sea: Imagined Histories of Sexual Technologies, as well as the editor of Queer Game Studies. From 2023 to 2027, they are the co-editor-in-chief, with Liz Elcessor, of the Journal of Cinema and Media Studies. They are also one of the co-founders of the Queerness in Games Conference.

== Education ==
Ruberg received their Ph.D. in Comparative Literature from the University of California at Berkeley.

== Research ==
Ruberg's academic work focuses on queer game studies, a subfield of game studies that deals with LGBTQ representation and queer theory.

Their second book, The Queer Games Avant-Garde (Duke University Press, 2020), won the 2021 Israel Fishman Non-Fiction Award, a Stonewall Book Award, from the American Library Association. Their third book, Sex Dolls at Sea: Imagined Histories of Sexual Technologies (MIT Press, 2022), won the 2023 Anne Friedberg Innovative Scholarship Award from the Society of Cinema and Media Studies.

Ruberg co-edited, with Adrienne Shaw, Queer Game Studies (University of Minnesota Press, 2017), an anthology of essays by academics, journalists, and game designers about queer representation and queer theory in video games. The collection was reviewed favorably by the LA Review of Books and Lambda Literary.

== Other work ==
Ruberg is a co-founder of the Queerness in Games Conference, "a community-oriented, internationally-recognized event dedicated to exploring the intersection of LGBTQ issues and games" that ran from 2013 to 2020. From 2005 to 2009, they were a technology journalist writing for such publications as The Village Voice, Wired, The Economist, and Forbes.

== Awards and honors ==
- 2021 Israel Fishman Non-Fiction Award, a Stonewall Book Award
- 2022 SCMS Anne Friedberg Innovative Scholarship Award

== Selected publications ==
- Ruberg, B. (2022). Sex Dolls at Sea: Imagined Histories of Sexual Technologies. Cambridge, MA: MIT Press.
- Ruberg, B. (2020). The Queer Games Avant-Garde. Durham, NC: Duke University Press.
- Ruberg, B. (2019). Video Games Have Always Been Queer. New York, NY: NYU Press.
- Brewer, Joanna, Bo Ruberg, Amanda Cullen, and Christopher Persaud (eds, 2023). Real Life in Real Time: Live Streaming Culture. Cambridge, MA: MIT Press.
- Ruberg, B. and Adrienne Shaw (eds, 2017). Queer Game Studies. Minneapolis, MN: Minnesota University Press.
