= Cynthia Baron =

American film scholar

- Education: BA in philosophy, University of California, Berkeley MA in film, San Francisco State University Ph.D. in Film, Literature, and Culture, University of Southern California
- Occupation: Academic
- Employer(s): Bowling Green State University, Ohio
- Website: https://www.bgsu.edu/arts-and-sciences/theatre-and-film/faculty-staff.html

Cynthia Baron is an American film scholar and professor of Theatre and Film Studies at the Bowling Green State University. She is currently the editor of the Journal of Film and Video, and The Projector: A Journal of Film, Media, and Culture.

== Honors ==
Baron was honored with the Society for Cinema and Media Studies Distinguished Service Award in 2023 and was recognized as the BGSU Research Scholar of Excellence from 2017 to 2020.

== Publications ==
Baron has authored several books, including Reframing screen performance (co-authored with Sharon Marie Carnicke), Modern Acting: The Lost Chapter of American Film and Theatre, Denzel Washington, and Acting Indie: Industry, Aesthetics, and Performance (co-authored with Yannis Tzioumakis).

She has published many academic journal articles ranging from Journal of Cinema and Media Studies, Velvet Light Trap, Quarterly Review of Film & Video, Popular Culture Review, Cineaste, Genre and Performance, Journal of Film and Video, Women's Studies Quarterly and Screen Acting.
