= Melodrama (film genre) =

Film genre

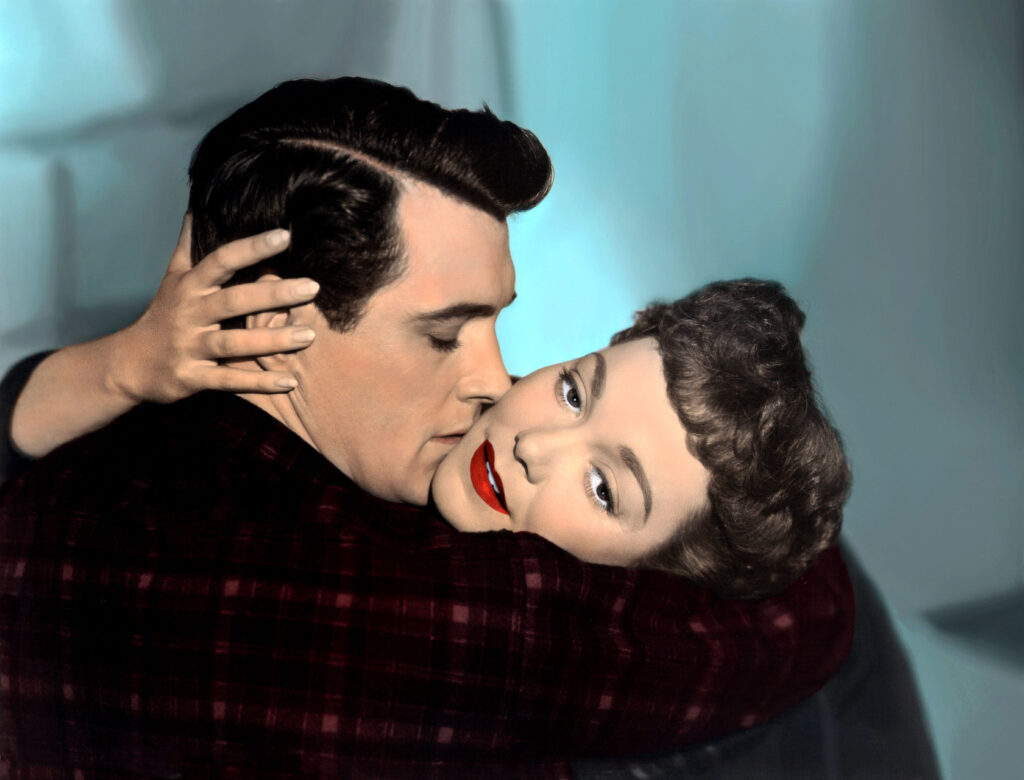
Rock Hudson and Jane Wyman in All That Heaven Allows (1955) by Douglas Sirk, a paradigmatic melodrama film.

In film studies and criticism, melodrama may variously refer to a genre, mode, style or sensibility characterized by its emphasis on intense and exaggerated emotions and heightened dramatic situations. There is no fixed definition of the term and it may be used to refer to a wide and diverse range of films of other genres including romantic dramas, historical dramas, psychological thrillers or crime thrillers, among others. Although it has been present in cinema since its inception, melodrama was not recognized as a distinct film genre until the 1970s and 1980s when critics and scholars identified its formal and thematic characteristics.

Unlike industry-defined genres, such as Westerns, melodrama was defined retrospectively, much like film noir. Its recognition as a genre stemmed from a critical reevaluation of Douglas Sirk's films (considered the greatest exponent of melodrama), particularly his 1950s works alongside those of Vincente Minnelli, which shaped the idea of the Hollywood "family melodrama". This genre centers on middle-class family conflicts, often generational, within contexts of social mobility and emotional trauma. The "family melodrama" category, originally centered on 1950s Hollywood, evolved to be regarded as the definitive form of melodrama, from which a basic model for understanding the genre as a whole emerged.

Melodrama has since been a key focus for discussions on gender, sexuality, and cultural reinterpretation. While traditionally associated with female audiences (with some scholars equating it with the category of "woman's films"), melodramas have garnered particular interest among gay men, largely due to their unintended camp elements. Camp, a subversive aesthetic that revels in exaggeration and artifice, had already drawn gay audiences to Sirk's films as works of camp before their academic rediscovery in the 1970s. Much of what has come to be called "gay cinema" shows a great affinity with the expressive modes of melodrama, and several of its main exponents have acknowledged its influence, such as John Waters, Pedro Almodóvar, Rainer Werner Fassbinder and Todd Haynes.

== Definition and historiography ==
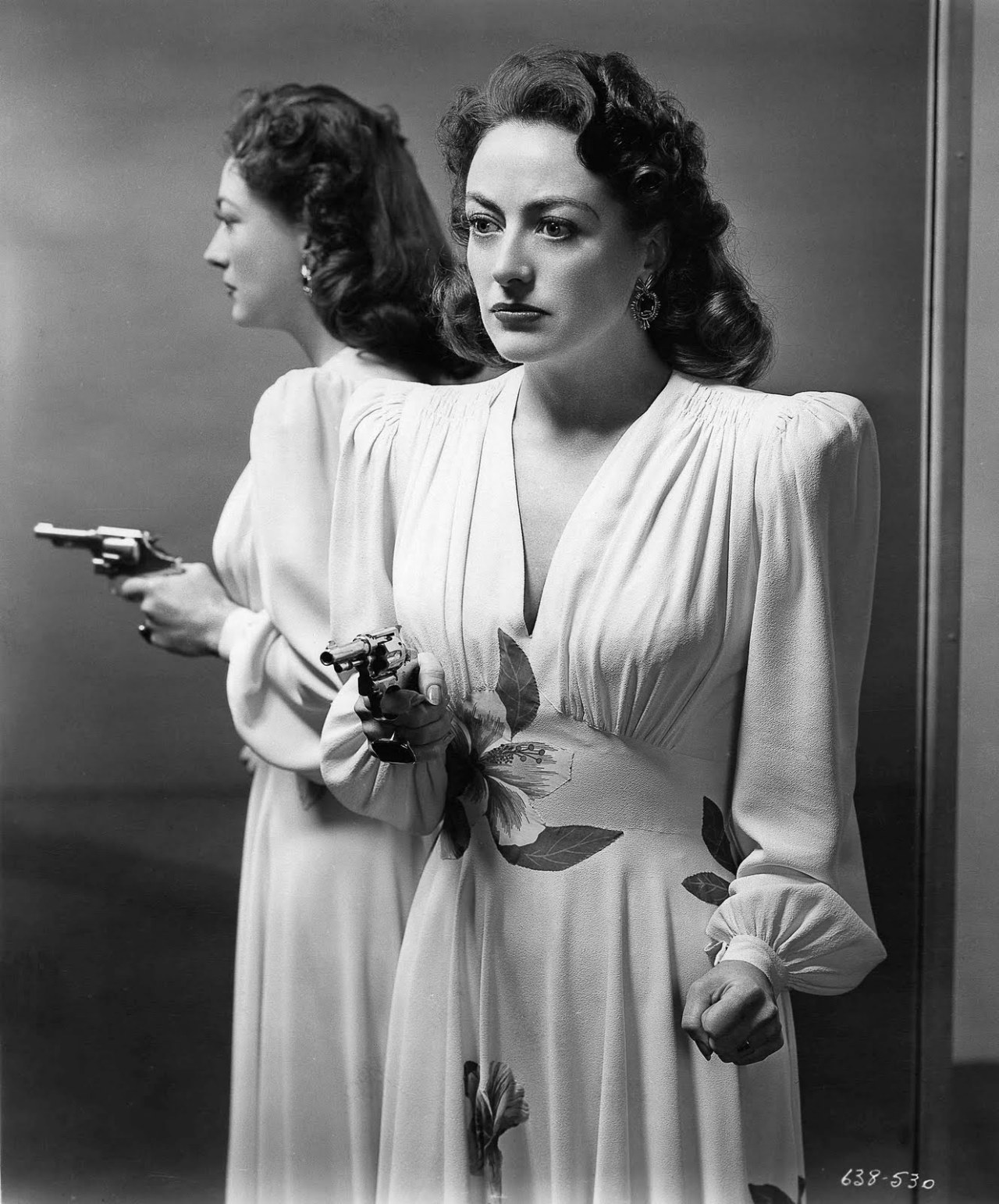
Joan Crawford in Mildred Pierce (1945), one of the few films called a "melodrama" in its pre-1970s and post-1970s conception.

Although melodrama can be found in cinema since its beginnings, it was not identified as a particular genre by film scholars—with its own formal and thematic features—until the 1970s and 1980s. Interest in melodrama by film historians, critics and theorists emerged in the early 1970s, at a time when new methodological approaches within film studies were being adopted, particularly neo-Marxism, psychoanalysis and feminism. In other words, the film genre became a focal point of academic interest in a context where ideology, gender and psychoanalysis were the most debated issues within film studies, which moved away from the auteur and mise-en-scène approaches of the 1960s. Thus, unlike other film genres, the notion of melodrama as a specific genre was not born out of the industry itself, but by critics and historians. This makes melodrama a comparable case to film noir, a term that is now widely recognised as a well-defined genre, but which was unknown during the 1940s, the period when most films included in that category were being made and shown. Like melodrama, film noir was identified and defined as a genre by film critics long after the films themselves had been made, though they differ in that the term "melodrama" was widely used within American film industry and journalism prior to its adoption by critics and historians. In fact, the term melodrama was used by American film companies with a very different meaning than the one it has since the 1970s, as it was used to refer to "action thrillers with fast-paced narratives, episodic story-lines featuring violence, suspense and death-defying stunts." As noted by scholars John Mercer and Martin Shingler:

Ironically, what Film Studies has come to regard as "melodrama" since 1970 are films with more words than action, inactive male protagonists, active and even domineering female characters, and anything but clear-cut and easily identifiable villains. In other words, the conception of "melodrama" arrived at by film scholars after 1970 is almost diametrically opposed to the conception of "melodrama" that circulated in the American film industry trade press in an earlier period. It is, however, the Film Studies' version of "melodrama" that is now in general circulation, having been adopted by Hollywood filmmakers, reviewers and journalists since the 1970s. Meanwhile, those films once described as "melodrama" by various sections of the film industry have come to be re-assigned under headings such as "film noir", the "western", "suspense thriller" and "horror movie."

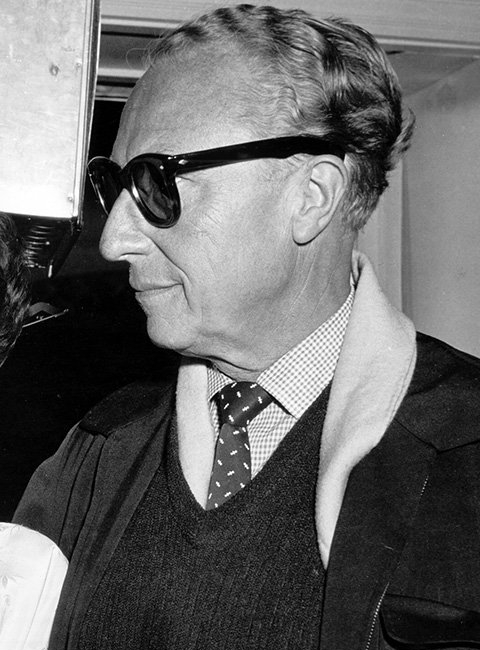
The standard definition of melodrama as a film genre was born out of a reappraisal of director Douglas Sirk, who was recognized as the major exponent of the style.

The recognition of melodrama as a genre arose from a critical reappraisal of the work of Douglas Sirk, which in turn was spearheaded by an interview the retired director gave to historian Jon Halliday in 1971. Sirk's analysis of his own films gave rise to a broader debate among critics about the representation of society in 1950s Hollywood, and the term melodrama evolved into a "broad category of cinema, one that often deals with highly-charged emotional issues, characterised by an extravagantly dramatic register and frequently by an overtly emotional mode of address." Melodrama does not refer to a single film form, but it is rather an umbrella term that hybridises several film cycles and sub-genres, including romantic dramas, costume dramas, psychological thrillers, gothic films, domestic dramas, juvenile delinquency films and crime films, among others. Some scholars have equated melodrama with the category of "woman's films", while others have used the term to refer to specific sub-genres, such as "family melodrama" or "maternal melodrama". As a result, there are several different and often contradictory definitions for melodrama as a genre. The "melodrama debate" that began in the 1970s has become one of the most complex within film studies, as it "engages with almost all of the key theoretical ideas within the discipline, from questions of genre and authorship, to issues surrounding representation, aesthetics and the ideological function of cinema." In the strictest sense, melodrama is defined as a "narrative with musical accompaniment to mark or punctuate the emotional effects", coming from the Greek words mélos (music) and dráma. In a broader sense, several film scholars have traced the historical origins of film melodrama in the theatrical genre of the same name, which enjoyed great popularity during the Victorian era.

"Melodrama owes its longevity to the fact that it has existed–and continues to exist–as a category of films defined differently at different times by different types of people (both within and beyond the film industry). Different kinds of film can be (have been and will continue to be) grouped together under this label not in any arbitrary fashion and not because anything can be thought of as melodrama but rather because it is an evolving form."

— Film scholars John Mercer and Martin Shingler, 2004.

Several of the first film scholars to focus on melodrama during the 1970s sought to narrow their field of analysis to a small, cohesive group of films, mainly 1950s American films directed by Sirk and Vincente Minnelli. This allowed a "more coherent field of investigation, a more distinctive canon of films with much greater consistency in terms of visual style, thematic content, performance and ideology." From these studies—especially the pioneering work of Thomas Elsaesser (1972)—emerged the notion of the Hollywood "family melodrama" genre, which was taken as the "ultimate form of film melodrama", as other scholars "assumed that his comments regarding [this genre] were applicable to Hollywood melodrama more generally." Some of the most notable scholars to adopt this approach were Geoffrey Nowell-Smith (1977), Laura Mulvey (1977–78) and Chuck Kleinhans (1978). By the 1980s, there was consensus on the recognition of family melodrama as a genre, as evidenced by its inclusion in Thomas Schatz's comprehensive book Hollywood Genres (1981), in which it had the same generic status as the Western and the gangster film. Schatz's work—a consolidation of the 1970s scholarship that preceded him—cemented some general perspectives on the genre, such as its basic model and the recognition of Sirk as the major exponent of the style. In this basic model, the genre focuses on the conflicts and tensions (usually generational) of the middle-class family, often within a context of upward social mobility and with an emphasis on personal emotional trauma. The model is also characterised by a central protagonist (usually the victim of the drama) with a high degree of audience identification, an emphasis on the direct depiction of psychological issues and a tendency for happy endings.

Since the 1980s, several scholars have opted to conceive melodrama as something other than a genre, like a style, a mode of expression or a "sensibility". During the 1990s, the film studies' established account of the melodrama film genre was reassessed, mainly through the work of leading film scholars Steve Neale and Rick Altman. In a 1993 article, Neale questioned virtually all the notions that had been established around the genre, pointing out the radical difference in the use of the term between post-1970s film scholars and the 1940s–1950s film industry that produced those films. His investigation was published in a context of renewal within film studies in the 1990s, which moved away from the theoretical analysis of film-texts in favour of an understanding of the films' historical reception by audiences and specialized writers. Neale's article was highly polemical and led to a serious reassessment of the genre within film studies, which revived previously stagnant discussions. Among those who defended the established film studies' account of melodrama was Altman, who responded directly to several of Neale's claims in a 1998 essay. Altman proposed a new model for the development of film genres named "genrification", arguing that previous generations of scholars mistakenly focused on genres as fixed classifications, when in fact they are evolving categories that may be redifined at any time. Altman's contribution allowed different historical definitions of "melodrama" to coexist and scholars to adopt the one that is most convenient for their research.

== Characteristics ==
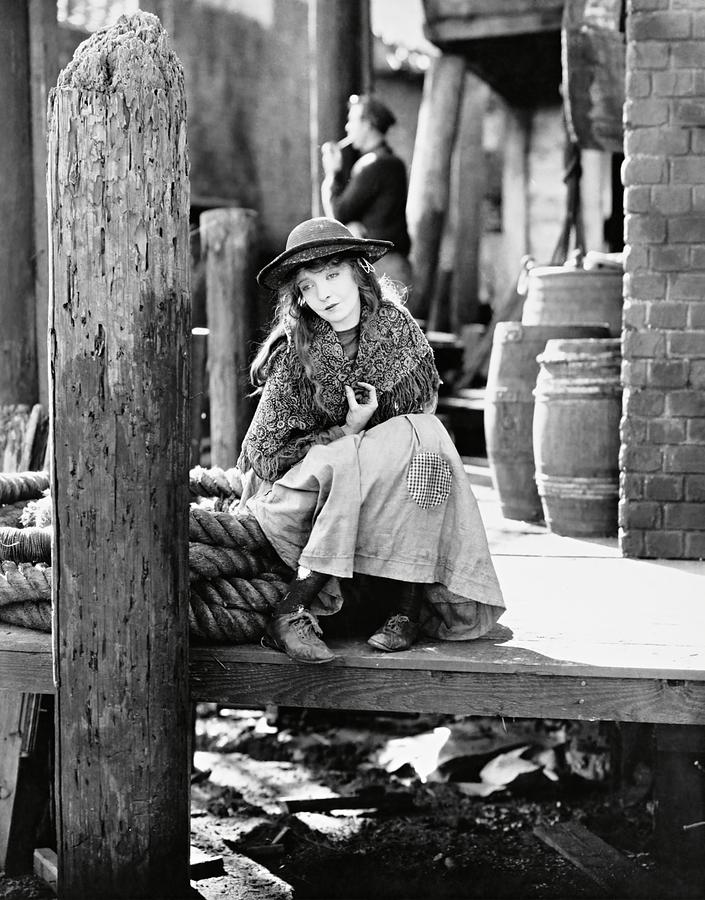
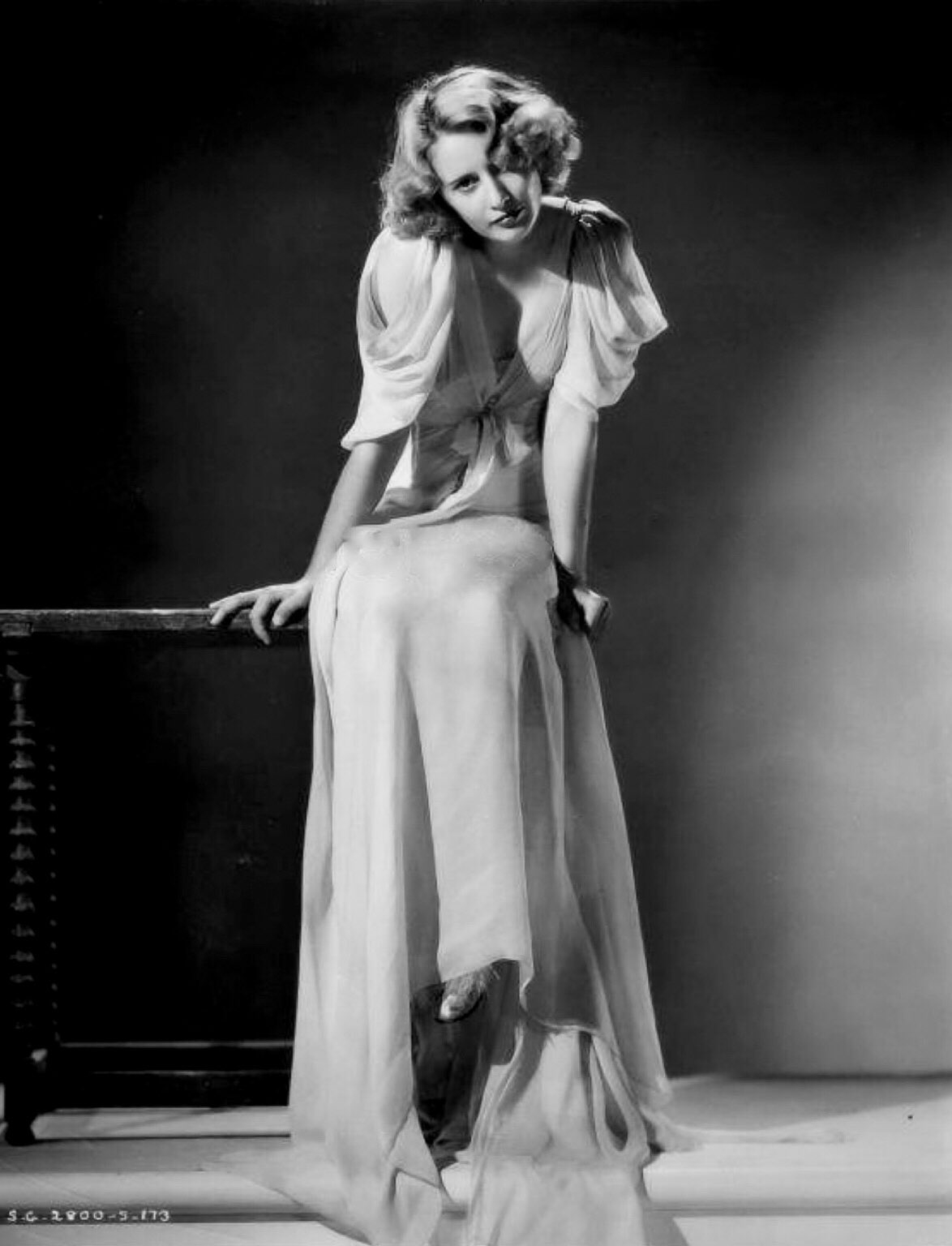
Lillian Gish in D. W. Griffith's Broken Blossoms (1919) (left) and Barbara Stanwyck in King Vidor's Stella Dallas (1937) (right), films regarded as prime examples of melodrama, featuring typical characteristics like victimized protagonists, intergenerational conflicts and sudden emotional shifts, among others.

The term "melodrama" has been used to describe a vast and diverse array of films spanning multiple decades, continents, and cultural contexts, prompting debate about the utility of such an expansive classification. This question emerged as a central concern for film scholars in the 1970s, during the initial attempts to systematically study melodrama as a distinct genre. David Morse pointed out these issues in 1972: "In general, melodrama is a term of little critical value; it has been so corrupted in common usage that to give it a more specific field of reference is a task which almost verges on the impossible. On the other hand, it ought to be attempted because of the important role that melodrama has played in American culture and because of the influence it has exercised over the American cinema." When melodrama was defined as a film genre between the 1970s and 1980s, it was done around a set of Hollywood films from the 1950s (mainly by Sirk and Minnelli), establishing its visual, thematic, performative and ideological parameters. Initially referred to as "family melodrama," a term credited to Thomas Elsaesser, this category evolved to be seen as the definitive form of melodrama, with its characteristics eventually applied to Hollywood melodrama as a whole. In his history of the family melodrama, Schatz laid the foundation of what is generally accepted as the basic model for melodrama as a film genre, which consolidated previous research by critics, theorists and historians. Focusing primarily on the 1950s, he identified several recurring themes and archetypes, such as the presence of an "intruder-redeemer" character and stories centered on the search for an ideal husband, lover or father, often driven by the anxieties of younger characters. These stories frequently placed the household at the heart of social interaction and depicted marriage as a complex institution—offering sexual liberation while imposing social constraints. Additionally, Schatz observed consistent patterns within these films, including victimized protagonists, generational conflicts, simplistic storylines, and subtle social critiques that were often concealed beneath the surface.

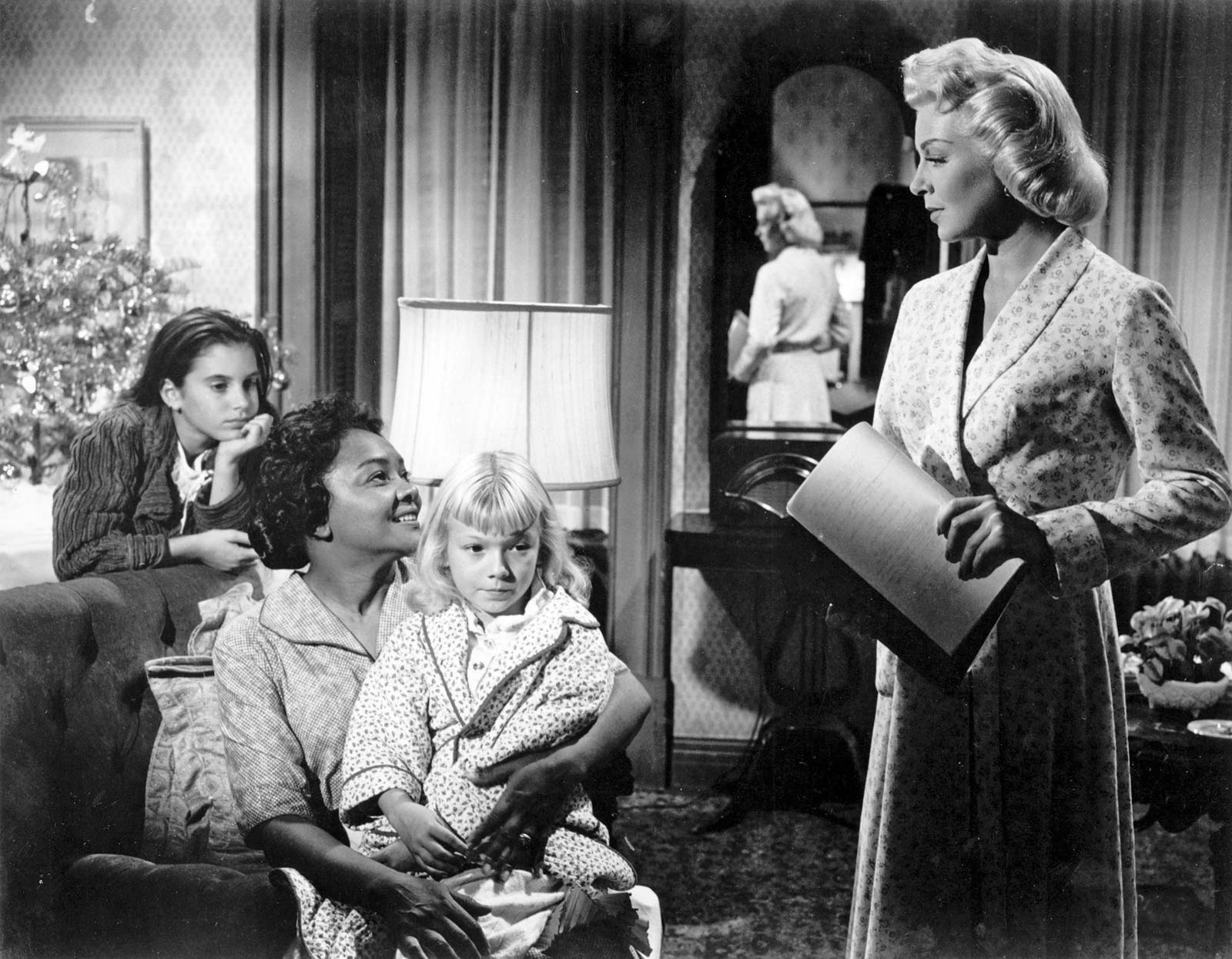
Karin Dicker, Juanita Moore, Terry Burnham and Lana Turner in Sirk's Imitation of Life (1959), an archetypal melodrama in which the female protagonist suffers recurring crises stemming from repressive societal expectations.

The "basic model" of melodrama as a film genre that emerged between the 1970s and 1980s is fundamentally characterized by its focus on emotional intensity and the portrayal of conflicts often within the confines of family or social structures. Central to melodrama is the depiction of the middle-class family, where generational conflicts are common, typically set in environments that reflect an affluent or upwardly-mobile lifestyle. As noted by film scholar Marcia Landy, the narratives revolve around a "constant struggle for gratification and equally constant blockages to its attainment", involving themes such as "seduction, betrayal, abandonment, extortion, murder, suicide, revenge, jealously, incurable illness, obsession, and compulsion." These stories frequently feature protagonists, generally women, who are victimized by societal norms, leading to dramatic climaxes where resolution might involve either domestic integration or tragic outcomes like isolation or death. The genre is structured to induce audience empathy, often through a central protagonist who embodies the audience's own fears or aspirations. This protagonist, typically not the father but rather the mother, son, or daughter, acts as a vessel for the audience's emotional investment, navigating a world where personal desires clash with societal expectations. Melodrama films often conclude with a form of wish-fulfillment, though the genre also acknowledges the often improbable nature of "happy endings", highlighting the tension between narrative desire and realistic outcomes. It often deconstructs the binary of good versus evil, presenting characters as both victims and agents of societal norms, offering insights into how individuals are shaped by and sometimes collude with oppressive structures. Another central aspect of melodrama is the concept of "situation", which introduces moments of narrative stasis or dramatic tension where characters confront life-altering events or dilemmas, like moral or emotional impasses, creating suspense and engaging the audience through the anticipation of resolution or escape from peril.

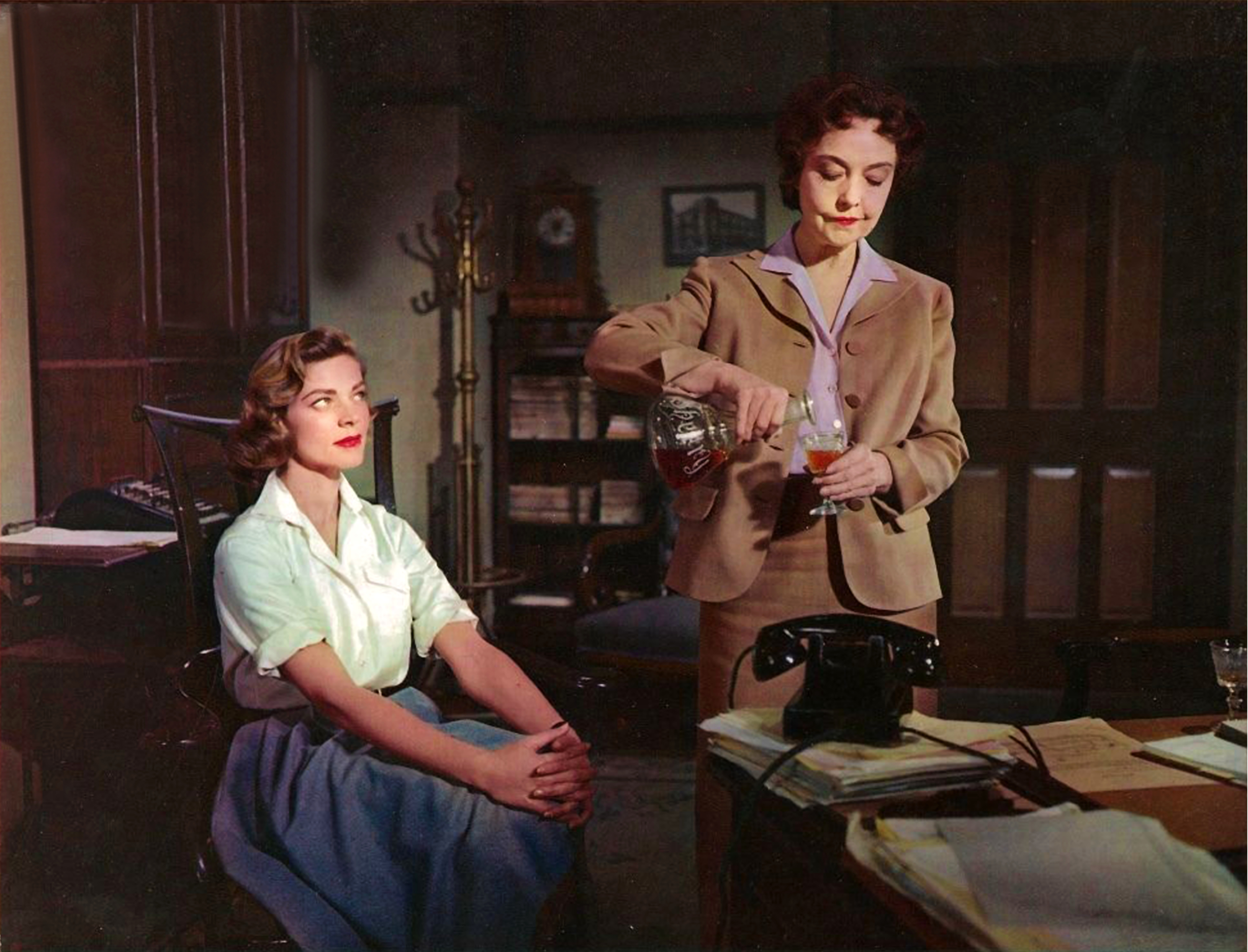
Lauren Bacall and Lillian Gish in Vincente Minnelli's The Cobweb (1955), an exemplary melodrama that is "explicitly concerned with the impact of Freudian notions on American society."

The corpus of films from which the genre was devised focuses on the 1950s, a period marked by significant social changes, as "women of all ages, races, marital and maternal statuses, and socioeconomic classes flooded out of their homes and into the workplaces of America, the family structure began to change, previously sacrosanct gender roles began to alter, and struggles over the meaning of female and male became particularly evident in the cultural atmosphere." It was also the period in which Freudian psychology gained prominence in American society and so these films incorporated themes of repression, hysteria, and the unconscious into their narratives, reflecting and influencing public discourse on these issues. Thus, Hollywood melodramas of the 1950s can be thought of as cultural artifacts rather than just escapist entertainment, as they engaged with the societal shifts of the time, depicting the nuclear family under stress, exploring the redefinition of masculinity and femininity, and critiquing or reinforcing the norms of the period. Melodrama films' focus on domestic life and personal conflict provided a way to discuss broader societal issues through the microcosm of family life. Film scholar Christine Gledhill's work, among others, has highlighted how melodrama serves as a battleground for ideological conflicts, particularly around gender and class, providing a platform where different social groups meet, negotiate, or clash over identity and social roles. The genre's emphasis on emotion over logic, its portrayal of characters as victims of larger social forces, and its use of excess have been analyzed as methods to critique and navigate the complexities of power, identity, and morality.

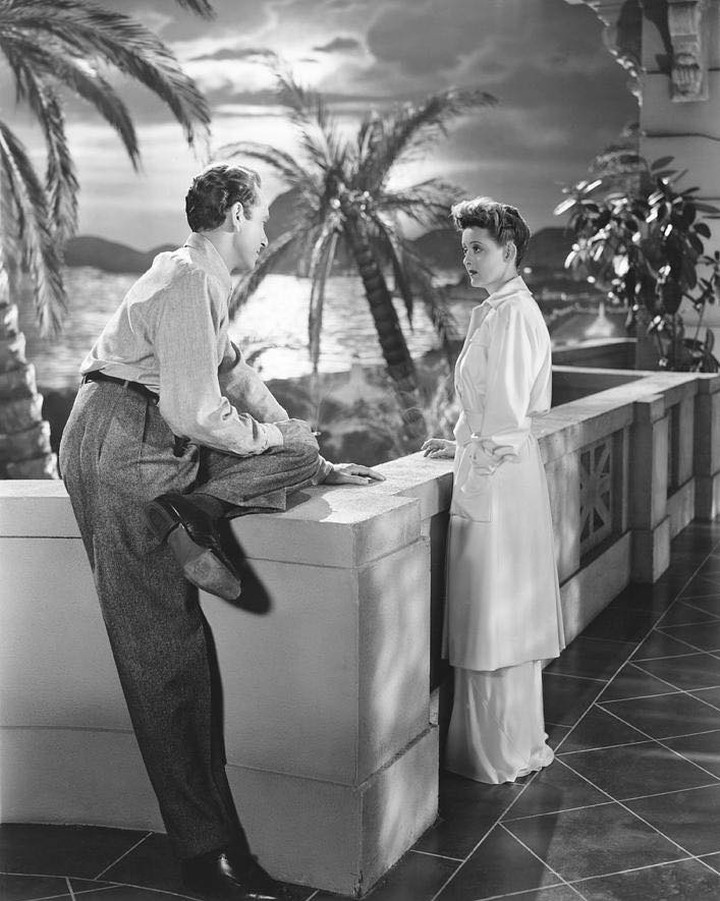
Paul Henreid and Bette Davis in Irving Rapper's Now, Voyager (1942). Although based on a realistic novel, it is "subject to a melodramatic overlay in the film's organisation of incident, music and mise-en-scène".

Melodrama is also characterized by its expressive mode, where the visual and auditory elements are used to amplify emotional content and the mise-en-scène often becomes overtly symbolic, with settings reflecting the inner turmoil or joy of characters. Lighting, composition, and decor play significant roles, often more communicative than dialogue, in conveying the emotional and psychological states of characters. Music is also an integral part of the storytelling, marking emotional beats, enhancing dramatic tension, and guiding the audience's emotional response. A characteristic of melodrama's style is the notion of "excess", where every element of the film's construction—be it visual, auditory, or narrative—strives to exceed the bounds of realism to express the inexpressible; this can manifest through exaggerated gestures, heightened speech patterns, or dramatic musical scores, which aim to provoke visceral reactions from the audience, such as tears or physical agitation. For these reasons, melodrama's unique positioning between realism and theatricality has been a subject of extensive academic scrutiny, as it is often critiqued for its "anti-realistic" style, which seems to consciously draw attention to its own artifice and thus challenges the viewer's passive consumption of cinema. This stylistic choice invites the audience to engage actively with the text, interpreting its layers of meaning beyond the literal. Melodrama's narrative style often deviates from linear paths and conventional resolutions, focusing on emotional exploration where plot serves as a means for a sustained, tension-filled emotional journey for the viewer, rather than culminating in a single climax.

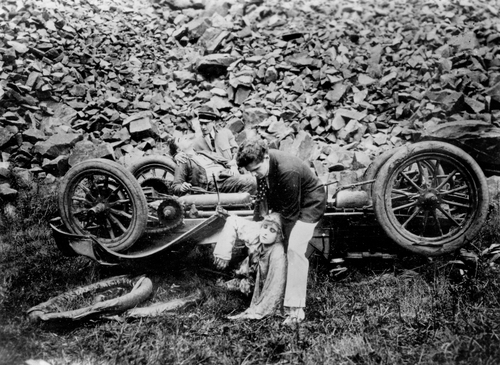
A still from the film serial The Perils of Pauline (1914). According to film scholar Ben Singer, melodrama is a "cluster concept", encompassing not only the standard Hollywood studio-era model but also the action-oriented "sensational melodramas" of the silent era.

In his 2001 work, film scholar Ben Singer proposed an alternative definition of melodrama that reconciles the standard view based on 1950s films with earlier and varied industry uses of the term dating back to the silent era. He put forward a flexible, multifaceted definition of melodrama as a "cluster concept", suggesting that it encompasses five key features—pathos, overwrought emotion, moral polarization, nonclassical narrative structure, and sensationalism—which can combine in different ways across various works. Pathos involves eliciting pity by portraying undeserved suffering, which resonates through emotional identification and self-association on the part of the audience. Overwrought emotion overlaps with pathos but extends to the heightened portrayal of dramatic urgency and tension, even in scenarios that lack the helplessness or victimization central to pathos. Moral polarization, meanwhile, reflects melodrama's stark divisions between good and evil, often viewed as a response to the moral ambiguity and cultural dislocation of modernity. Singer also identified a nonclassical narrative structure and sensationalism as integral to melodrama. The former is characterized by a preference for narrative devices such as coincidence, implausibility, and episodic progression, which depart from the cause-and-effect logic of classical narrative. These elements challenge the realism traditionally associated with naturalistic storytelling. Sensationalism, a hallmark of early stage melodrama, emphasizes action, violence, and spectacle, combining thrilling visuals with a loose connection to diegetic realism. This duality between melodrama's externalized, spectacular sensationalism and the introspective focus of Hollywood family melodramas exemplifies the genre's diversity. Singer underscored that these five features rarely all appear in a single work; instead, different combinations of them create distinct forms of melodrama. For instance, Hollywood melodramas often prioritize pathos and emotional intensity while omitting the stark moral binaries of earlier stage melodramas. Thus, Singer presents melodrama as a genre defined by its variability, allowing for a wide range of expressive possibilities across time and cultural contexts.

== Subgenres ==
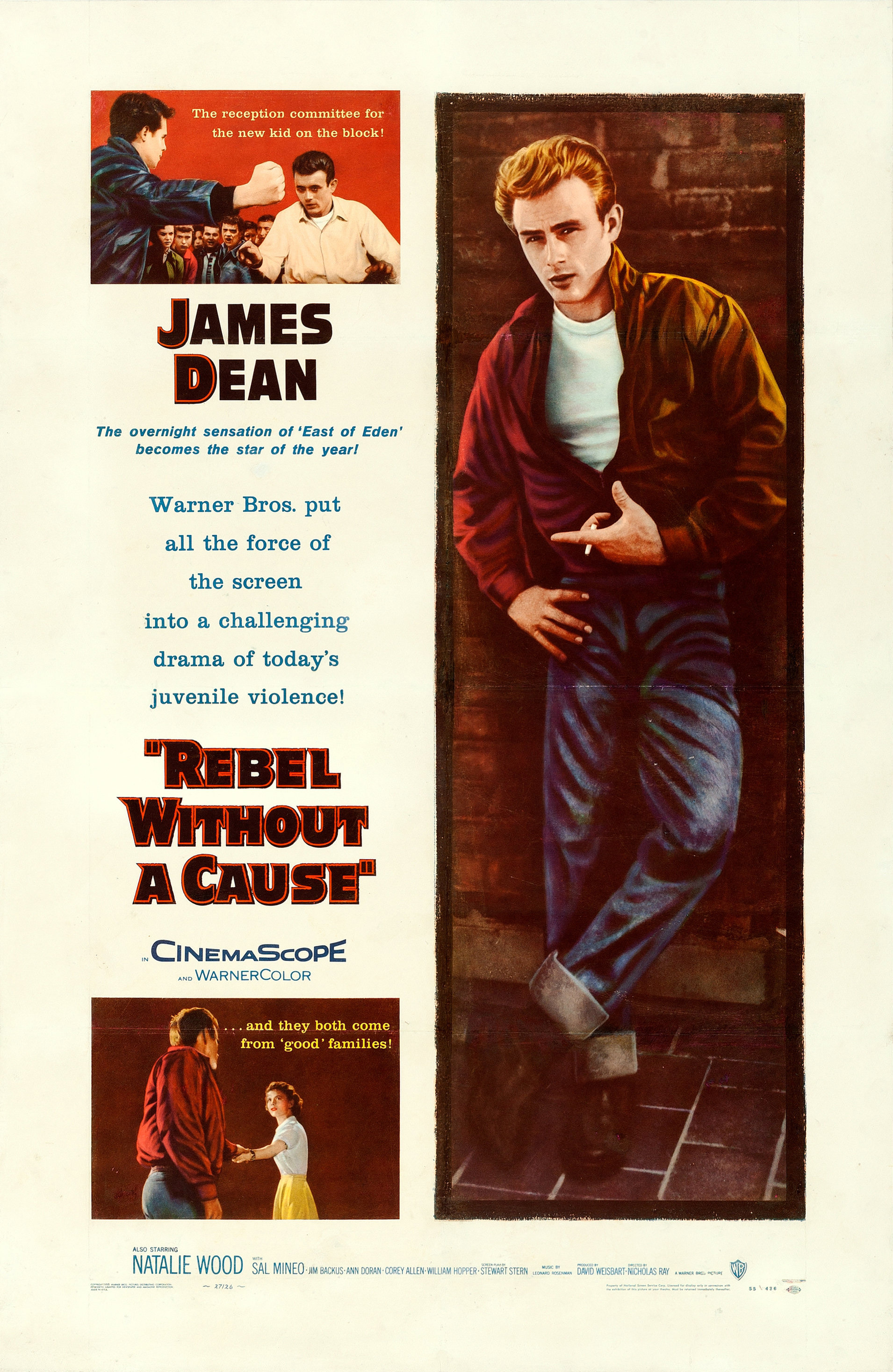
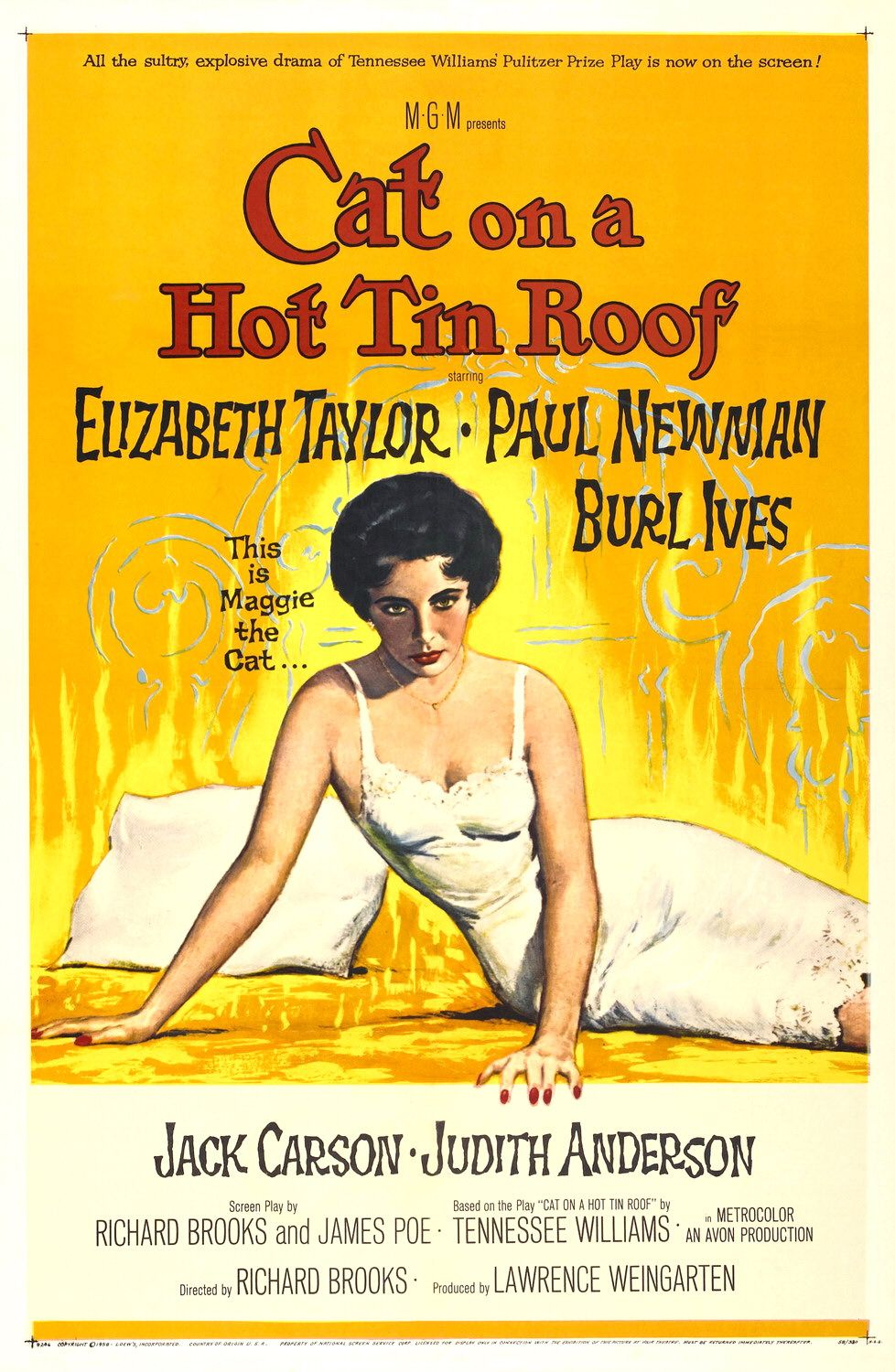
Theatrical release posters for Rebel Without a Cause (1955) and Cat on a Hot Tin Roof (1958), prime examples of two subgenres of family melodrama: the "male weepie" and the "family aristocracy" variant, respectively.

The quintessential form of melodrama is the "family melodrama", a concept originally developed by academics to describe a select group of 1950s Hollywood films but later expanded to consolidate itself as the foundational formula of the melodrama genre as a whole. According to Schatz, the family melodrama can be further subdivided into three discreet subgenres or variants:

- the "widow-lover" melodramas, which focus on older women, typically widows or divorcees, navigating environments that restrict their autonomy, as patriarchal structures force them to reconcile their domestic and maternal responsibilities with their romantic and sexual lives. Examples include All That Heaven Allows (1955), Peyton Place (1957), A Summer Place (1959) and Imitation of Life (1959).
- the "family aristocracy" melodramas, which explore generational attitudes and tensions, framing marriage as a paradoxical institution that offers escape from family burdens while ensuring its preservation. Examples include Written on the Wind (1956), The Long Hot Summer (1958), Giant (1956), Cat on a Hot Tin Roof (1958), From the Terrace (1960) and Home From the Hill (1960).
- the "male weepies", which focus on middle-class men struggling as husbands, lovers or fathers, showing them as well-intentioned but crushed by the weight of societal expectations. Examples include Rebel Without a Cause (1955), East of Eden (1955), The Cobweb (1955), Tea and Sympathy (1956) and Bigger Than Life (1956).

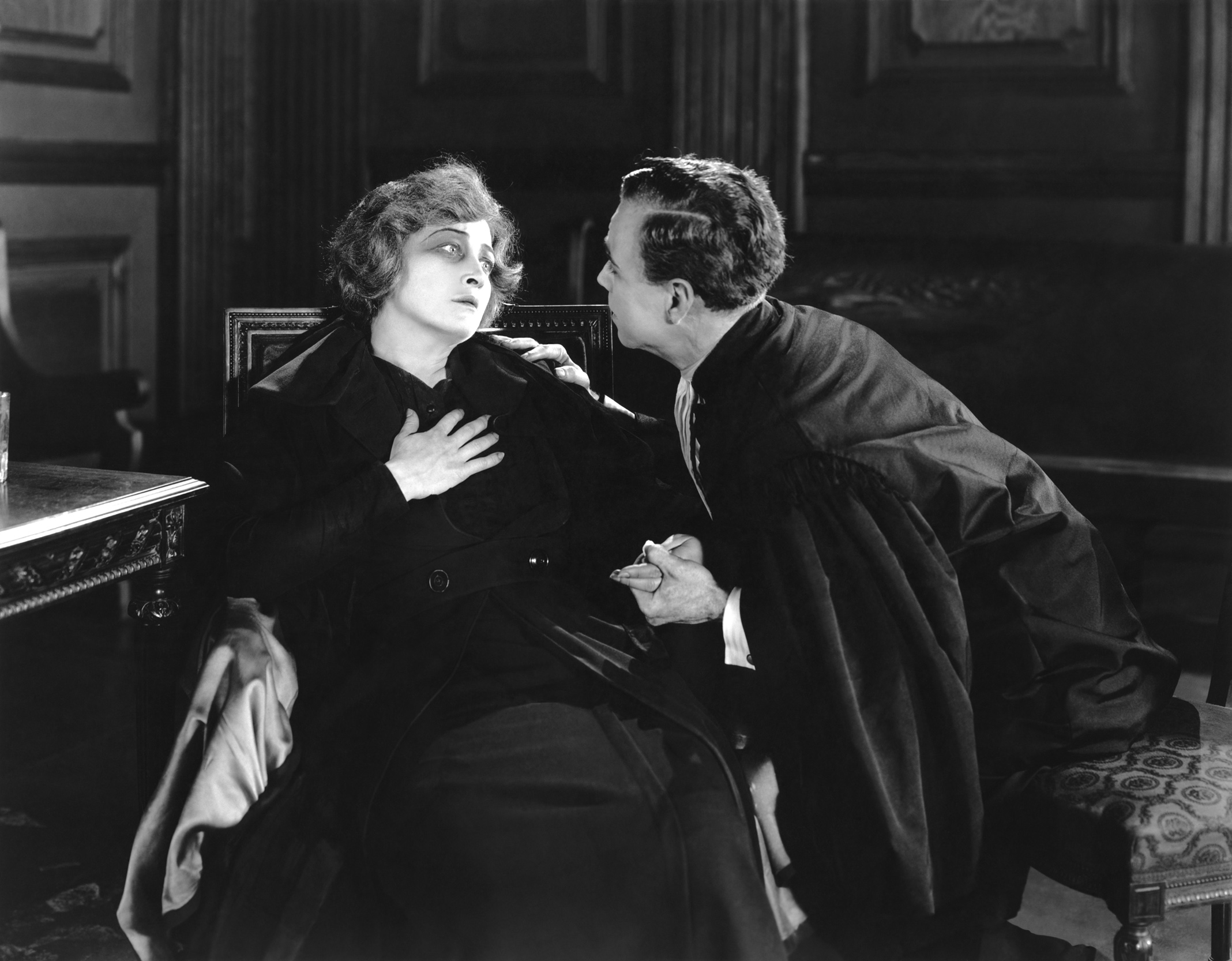
Pauline Frederick and Casson Ferguson in Frank Lloyd's Madame X (1920), considered the originator of the "maternal melodrama" subgenre.

The incorporation melodramatic conventions in a diverse range of films has also led to the identification of several subgenres such as crime melodrama, romantic melodrama, sex melodrama and western melodrama, among others. One of the most relevant subgenres in studies on the genre is the so-called "maternal melodrama", with examples including John Stahl's Only Yesterday (1933), King Vidor's Stella Dallas (1937), Edmund Goulding's The Old Maid (1939) and Mitchell Leisen's To Each His Own (1946). This subgenre centers on the profound emotional and societal complexities of motherhood and often served as a showcase for Hollywood actresses transitioning into more mature roles. According to film scholar Christian Viviani, Frank Lloyd's silent film Madame X (1920) inaugurated the maternal melodrama subgenre and led to numerous productions following its model. Maternal melodrama became popular and evolved through the 1920s and 1930s with films like D.W. Griffith's Way Down East (1921), Henry King's Stella Dallas (1925), Clarence Brown's The Goose Woman (1925) and Smouldering Fires (1925), Victor Fleming's Common Clay (1930), William A. Wellman's So Big (1932) and Edmund Goulding's That Certain Woman (1937), among others. By the 1940s, the maternal melodrama reached its peak, reflecting the era's heightened focus on women during World War II, where cinematic femininity was polarized between the glamorous pin-up and the devoted mother.

The "woman's film" category has also been regarded as a subgenre of melodrama, retrospectively formulated in response to feminist scholars' interest in the genre and its long-standing relegation as a cultural domain associated with women. As noted by Gledhill: "The fact that the home and personal relationships provide common ground to the family melodrama and woman's film has given substance to the assumption that the latter constitutes a sub-set of melodrama, tailored specifically for female audiences." Film scholar Laura Mulvey proposed an influential distinction between male and female point-of-view melodrama, "demarcating the 'tragically' inclined family melodramas of Minnelli and Sirk from Sirk's work in the more humble sphere of the woman's film, centring on female protagonist."

== History ==
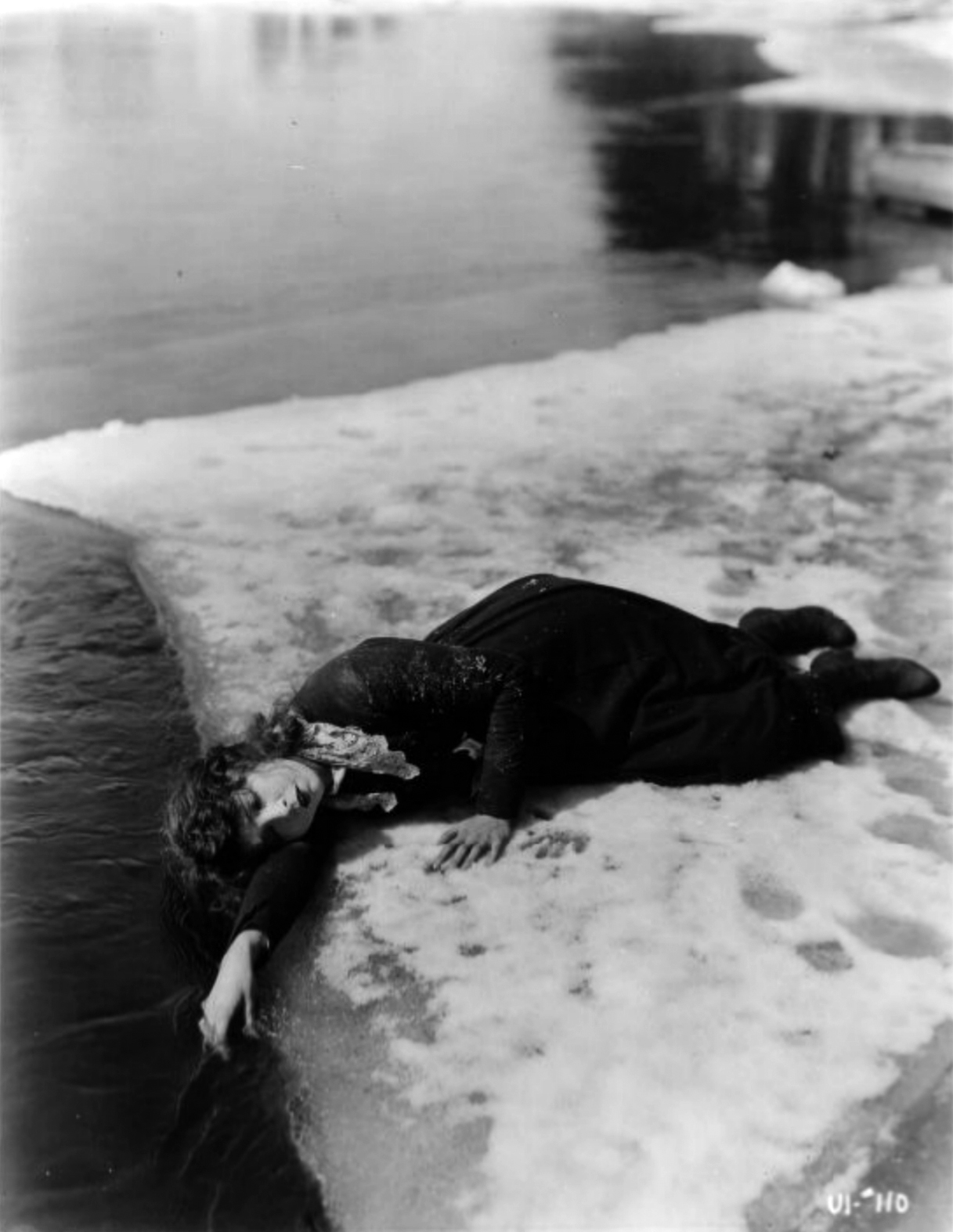
Lillian Gish in D. W. Griffith's Way Down East (1920).

Melodrama as a specifically cinematic mode has its antecedents in certain literary and theatrical forms from which screenwriters and directors borrowed their models. As noted by Elsaesser, the "media and literary forms which have habitually embodied melodramatic situations have changed considerably in the course of history, and, further, they differ from country to country". For example, in the United Kingdom, melodramatic motifs have mainly appeared in novels and Gothic literature, while Victorian theater saw an "unprecedented vogue" for the melodramas of Robert Buchanan and George Robert Sims in the 1880s and 1890s. In France, melodramatic antecedents can be found in costume drama and the historical novel; in Germany, in "high" drama and the ballad, as well as more popular forms like Moritat ("street songs"); while in Italy, melodramatic situations were more developed in opera than in novels. Elsaesser wrote that the origin of melodrama can be traced to two distinct currents. One of them leads to forms of oral narrative and drama like medieval morality plays, gestes, fairy tales and folk-songs, as well as their revival by Romantic authors such as Walter Scott, Lord Byron, Heinrich Heine and Victor Hugo, which "has its low-brow echo in barrel-organ songs, music-hall drama, and what in Germany is known as Bänkellied". According to Elsaesser: "The characteristic features for our present purposes in this tradition are not so much the emotional shock-tactics and the blatant playing on the audience's known sympathies and antipathies, but rather the non-psychological conception of the dramatis personae, who figure less as autonomous individuals than to transmit the action and link the various locales within a total constellation."

If the dictionary definition of melodrama is taken into consideration (that is, a "dramatic narrative in which musical accompaniment marks the emotional effects"), all silent film drama qualifies as "melodramatic", as it needed the accompaniment of a piano for punctuation. To compensate for the "expressiveness, range of inflection and tonality, rhythmic emphasis and tension normally present in the spoken word", silent film directors had to develop an "extremely subtle and yet precise formal language" that involved cinematography, staging, acting and editing.

D. W. Griffith has been described as the "master of the silent melodrama", as he established its stylistic features in films like Hearts of the World (1918), Broken Blossoms (1919), True Heart Susie (1919), Way Down East (1920) and Orphans of the Storm (1922), in which the "sociosexual trials and tribulations of the sisters [Lillian Gish and Dorothy Gish] et al. were communicated in theatrical pantomime." Griffith employed various cinematic techniques to highlight the characters' "virtuous suffering": extended camera shots, a measured storytelling pace, repeated close-ups of the distressed heroine (often with eyes turned upwards), and a solemn musical accompaniment.

== Gay significance ==
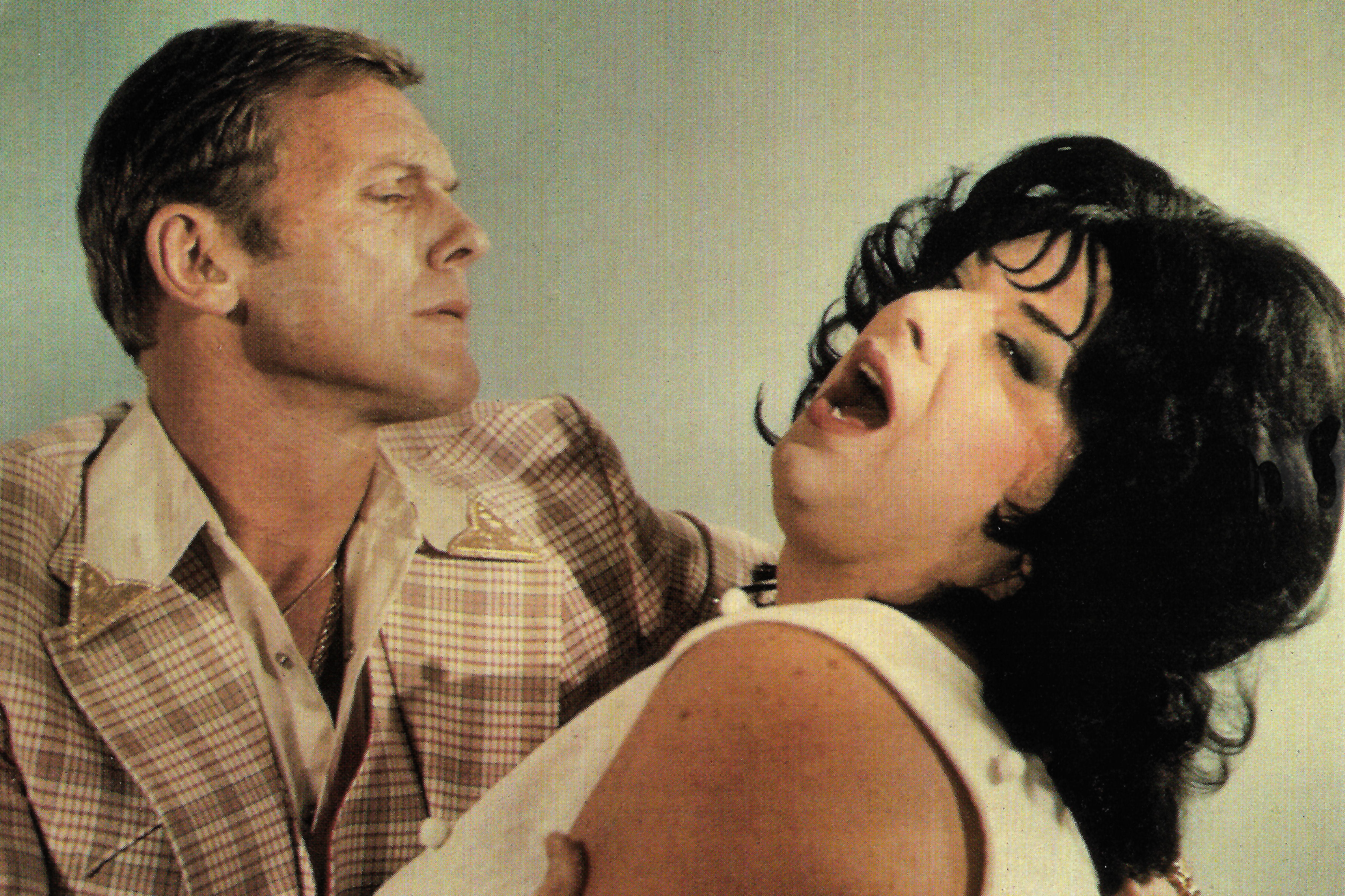
Tab Hunter and Divine in John Waters's Polyester (1981), a camp-laden parody of Sirk's melodramas.

Melodrama has long been a focal point for film scholars due to its ability to spark discussions on gender and sexuality within cinematic texts. Since the mid-1980s, sexuality has become a significant topic in film studies, largely due to contributions from gay and lesbian scholars and the rise of queer theory and studies, which have highlighted questions regarding gay spectatorship and sensibility in relation to melodrama. Some writers have considered the genre to be "cinema made for and by gay men." Despite the commonly assumed female demographic associated with woman's films, the "most conspicuous group who have found the 1950s family melodrama of particular interest are gay men", mainly because of the films' unintentional camp content. Although its definition is complex, camp can be identified as a subversive approach to reinterpreting and producing cultural products that delights in the exaggerated and the artificial. Before their 1970s reappraisal by film scholars, Sirk's films were already subject to gay following as camp works. In addition to Sirk's, several works by Minnelli, Nicholas Ray, George Cukor, Billy Wilder and Joseph Losey acquired cult status in gay male culture because of the "very excessiveness, extreme emotionality, mannered performances, style and very direct sentimental form of address that these films demonstrate." Several features of the family melodrama, later emphasized by film theorists as integral to the subversive and progressive essence of the genre, were precisely the attributes that gay men found humorous. Several later exponents of gay cinema, like John Waters, Pedro Almodóvar, Rainer Werner Fassbinder and Todd Haynes, among others, have cited campy melodramas as a major influence.

== See also ==
- List of melodrama films
- Marxist film theory
- Psychoanalytic film theory

== Bibliography ==
- Byars, Jackie (1991). All that Hollywood Allows: Re-reading Gender in 1950s Melodrama. London: Routledge. ISBN 0-231-11328-5.
- Gledhill, Christine, ed. (1987). Home is Where the Heart Is: Studies in Melodrama and the Woman's Film. London: British Film Institute. ISBN 0-85170-200-7.
- Karush, Matthew B. (2012). Culture of Class: Radio and Cinema in the Making of a Divided Argentina, 1920–1946. Durham & London: Duke University Press. ISBN 978-0-8223-5243-3.
- Landy, Marcia, ed. (1991). Imitations of Life: A Reader on Film & Television Melodrama. Contemporary Film and Television Series. Detroit: Wayne State University Press. ISBN 0-8143-2064-3 – via Internet Archive.
- McHugh, Kathleen; Abelmann, Nancy, eds. (2005). South Korean Golden Age Melodrama: Gender, Genre, and National Cinema. Detroit: Wayne State University Press. ISBN 978-081-433-253-5 – via Google Books.
- Mercer, John; Shingler, Martin (2013) [2004]. Melodrama: Genre, Style, Sensibility (eBook). Short Cuts. London; New York: Wallflower, Columbia University Press. ISBN 978-0-231-50306-8.
- Sadlier, Darlene J., ed. (2009). Latin American Melodrama: Passion, Pathos, and Entertainment. Urbana & Chicago: University of Illinois Press. ISBN 978-0-252-03464-0.
- Schatz, Thomas (1981). Hollywood Genres: Formulas, Filmmaking, and the Studio System. New York: Random House. ISBN 0-394-32255-X.
- Singer, Ben (2001). Belton, John (ed.). Melodrama and Modernity: Early Sensational Cinema and Its Contexts. Film and Culture. New York: Columbia University Press. ISBN 978-023-111-329-8.
