= Jeremy Butler =

Jeremy Butler may refer to:

- Jeremy Butler (American football), wide receiver
- Jeremy Butler, the CEO of Iraq and Afghanistan Veterans of America
- Jeremy G. Butler, scholar of film and television studies as well as an acoustic music radio show host in the United States
