= Adrienne Shaw =

American game studies scholar

Academic background
- Education: University of Pennsylvania Mount Holyoke College

Academic work
- Institutions: Temple University
- Main interests: video games, Queer theory, Cultural Studies
- Notable works: Gaming at the Edge: Sexuality and Gender at the Margins of Gamer Culture (2014)

Adrienne Shaw (born 1983) is an American game studies scholar and Associate Professor at Temple University in the Klein College of Media and Communication. She is known for her work on queer theory and LGBTQ representation in video games. She is the author of Gaming at the Edge: Sexuality and Gender at the Margins of Gamer Culture, the co-editor of Queer Game Studies, and the founder of the LGBTQ Video Games Archive.

== Education ==
Shaw received her Ph.D. in 2010 from the Annenberg School for Communication at the University of Pennsylvania.

== Research ==
Shaw's academic work focuses on gamer identity, the representation of marginalized populations in video games, and how members of marginalized communities understand their relationship to video games. Her work also extends to queerness and technology more broadly.

Her first book, Gaming at the Edge: Sexuality and Gender at the Margins of Gamer Culture (University of Minnesota Press, 2014) received the 2016 Outstanding Book Award from the Popular Communication Division of the International Communication Association, Warp Zone's 2015 Video Game Librarian Award, and it was listed on the American Library Association's 2016 Rainbow List. Media scholar Adrienne Massanari describes the book as an intervention "against much of the rhetoric of gaming culture that suggests that diversity is good but does little to interrogate why or for whom or in what ways diversity is desirable."

Shaw co-edited, with Bo Ruberg, Queer Game Studies (University of Minnesota Press, 2017), an anthology of essays by academics, journalists, and game designers about queer representation and queer theory in video games. The collection was reviewed favorably by the LA Review of Books and Lambda Literary.

Shaw also co-edited, with Katherine Sender, Queer Technologies: Affordances, Affect, Ambivalence (Routledge, 2018) and, with D. Travers Scott, Interventions: Communication Research and Practice (Peter Lang, 2018).

== Other work ==
Shaw is the founder of the LGBTQ Video Game Archive, a publicly available online archive that catalogues LGBTQ representation in video games. As part of her work with the LGBTQ Video Game Archive, Shaw worked with the Internet Archive to resurrect the oldest known example of an LGBTQ video game, C.M. Ralph's Caper in the Castro.

In 2018, Shaw was one of the curators of the Rainbow Arcade exhibit at the Schwules Museum in Berlin, the first exhibit to cover the history of LGBTQ people in video games. USA Today included Rainbow Arcade on its list of best exhibits in Europe for winter 2019.

== Controversy ==
In 2014, Shaw was one of the researchers in the Digital Games Research Association singled out for her work on feminism and video games during the Gamergate controversy. As a result of the attention, Shaw and Shira Chess wrote analyses about their experiences in the Journal of Broadcasting & Electronic Media and the Transactions of the Digital Games Research Association.

== Selected publications ==
- Shaw, A. (2014). Gaming at the Edge: Sexuality and Gender at the Margins of Gamer Culture. Minneapolis, MN: University of Minnesota Press.
- Chess, S. and Adrienne Shaw. (2015). A conspiracy of fishes, or, how we learned to stop worrying about #GamerGate and embrace hegemonic masculinity. Journal of Broadcasting and New Media, 59(1), 208-220. doi:10.1080/08838151.2014.999917
- Shaw, A. (2012). Do you identify as a gamer? Gender, race, sexuality, and gamer identity. New Media & Society, 14(1), 28–44. https://doi.org/10.1177/1461444811410394
- Shaw, A. (2010). What Is Video Game Culture? Cultural Studies and Game Studies. Games and Culture, 5(4), 403–424. https://doi.org/10.1177/1555412009360414
- Shaw, A. (2009). Putting the Gay in Games: Cultural Production and GLBT Content in Video Games. Games and Culture, 4(3), 228–253. https://doi.org/10.1177/1555412009339729
