= Jane Feuer =

American media scholar (1951–2021)

Jane Feuer (April 24, 1951 – January 8, 2021) was a Professor of film studies in the English and Communication Departments at the University of Pittsburgh, United States. She was a film and television studies scholar and one of the founders of Console-ing Passions, a biennial conference in feminism, television, video and new media.

She is the author of MTM: Quality Television (London: BFI Publishing, 1985), The Hollywood Musical (London: BFI Publishing, 1993), and Seeing Through the Eighties (Durham: Duke University Press, 1995).

She was a Fulbright Distinguished Professor at the University of Tübingen, Germany for the 2009-2010 academic year.

== Selected works ==
- The Hollywood Musical
- Seeing through the Eighties: Television and Reaganism
