= New Review of Film and Television Studies =

- Discipline: Film studies, television studies
- Language: English
- Edited by: Maria San Filippo

Publication details
- History: 2003-present
- Publisher: Routledge
- Frequency: Quarterly

Standard abbreviations
- ISO 4: New Rev. Film Telev. Stud.

Indexing
- ISSN: 1740-0309 (print); 1740-7923 (web)
- OCLC no.: 56722575

Links
- Journal homepage; Online access; Online archive

New Review of Film and Television Studies is a quarterly peer-reviewed academic journal covering research in the humanities that makes a contribution to film and television studies. It was established in 2003 and is published by Routledge. The editor-in-chief is Maria San Filippo (Emerson College). The journal was established by Warren Buckland (Oxford Brookes University) who served as editor until 2015. Kyle Stevens (Appalachian State University) was editor from 2016 through 2019.

== Abstracting and indexing ==
The journal is abstracted and indexed in the British Humanities Index, the International Bibliography of Theatre & Dance, FIAF International Index to Film Periodicals, Emerging Sources Citation Index, Web of Science, EBSCOhost, Scopus, Ovid FIAF Databases, and ProQuest.

== See also ==
- List of film periodicals
