= Horace Newcomb =

American author and columnist

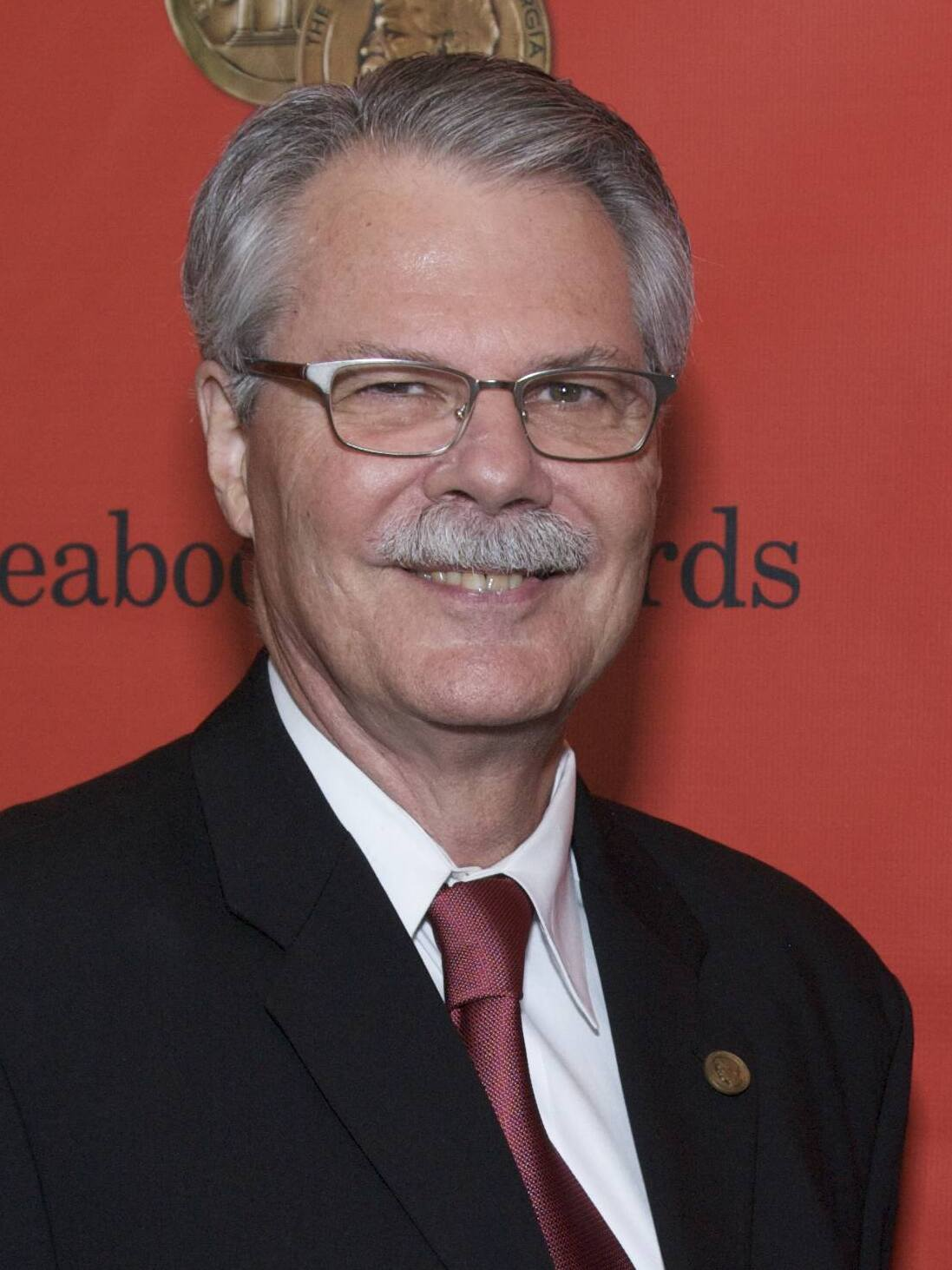
Newcomb at the 2013 Peabody Awards

Horace Newcomb held the Lambdin Kay Chair for the Peabody Award in the Grady College of Journalism and Mass Communication at the University of Georgia from 2001 through June 2013. Prior to this, he was a member of the Board of Jurors from 1989 to 1995.

== Career ==
Newcomb is the author of TV: The Most Popular Art (Doubleday/Anchor, 1974), co-author of The Producer's Medium (Oxford University Press, 1983), and editor of seven editions of Television: The Critical View (Oxford University Press, 1976–2006). In 1973–74, while teaching full-time, he was also the daily television columnist for the Baltimore Morning Sun. From 1994 to 1996 he served as Curator for the Museum of Broadcast Communications (Chicago) with primary duties as editor of The Museum of Broadcast Communications Encyclopedia of Television (Taylor & Francis, 2nd edition, 2004), a four-volume, 2,600 page reference work containing more than 1,200 entries on major people, programs, and topics related to television in the United States, the United Kingdom, Canada and Australia. The MBC Encyclopedia of Television is the definitive library reference work of first record for the study of television. Newcomb is also author of numerous articles in scholarly journals, magazines and newspapers.

His research and teaching interests are in media, society and culture and he has written widely in the fields of television criticism and history. Recent lectures in Italy, Taiwan, Norway, Spain, Denmark, Finland, Sweden, Korea, Switzerland and China have focused on cultural exchange and international media industries.

Newcomb received the B.A. from Mississippi College, Clinton, Mississippi in 1964. He studied as a Woodrow Wilson Fellow and University Fellow at the University of Chicago, receiving the M.A. in 1965 (General Studies in the Humanities) and the Ph.D. in English (American Literature), 1969. He taught at colleges and universities in Iowa, Michigan, Maryland, and Texas before joining the Peabody Award at the University of Georgia in 2001.
