= Chuck Kleinhans =

American professor and journal editor

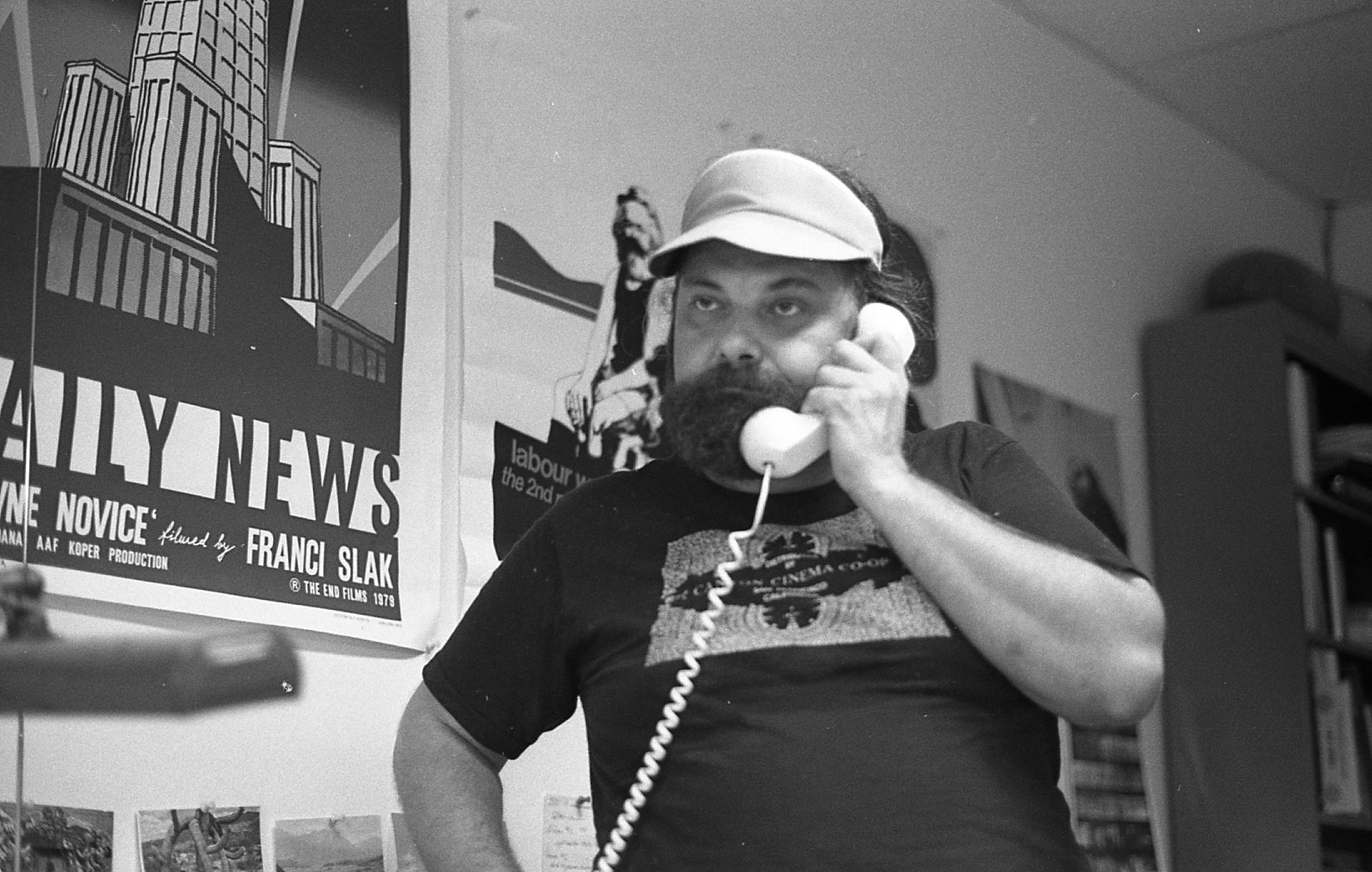
- Chuck Kleinhans in his office at Northwestern University, 1980
- Born: October 2, 1942; Chicago, Illinois, US
- Died: December 14, 2017 (aged 75); Eugene, Oregon, US
- Other name: Charles Kleinhans
- Occupation: professor
- Known for: Jump Cut
- Spouse: Julia Lesage
- Awards: Outstanding Pedagogical Achievement (2007, the Society for Cinema and Media Studies)

Academic background
- Education: University of Wisconsin–Madison, Indiana University Bloomington
- Thesis: Toward a Generic Definition of Late Nineteenth Century Farce: Courteline, Feydeau, Pinero, Wilde, Shaw, and Jarry (1973)
- Doctoral advisor: Ulrich Weisstein

Academic work
- Discipline: film studies, television studies, media studies
- Institutions: Northwestern University
- Doctoral students: Jeremy G. Butler
- Website: Website

Chuck Kleinhans (October 2, 1942–December 14, 2017) was an associate professor of film studies at Northwestern University for 32 years and co-founded Jump Cut with Julia Lesage and John Hess. He co-edited the journal from its inception in 1974 until his death.

In 2007, the Society for Cinema and Media Studies awarded him its Outstanding Pedagogical Achievement Award.

== Early life and education ==
Charles Nelson Kleinhans was born in a working-class neighborhood of Chicago. In the early 1950s, his family moved to suburban Park Ridge.

He graduated from Maine Township High School in 1960, a classmate of Harrison Ford. He then enrolled in the University of Wisconsin–Madison, from which he earned a Bachelor of Arts in comparative literature.

Kleinhans was in Naval Reserve Officers Training Corps in college and after graduating was obligated to spend two years in the Navy. Afterward, he resumed his study of comparative literature as a graduate student at Indiana University Bloomington. There, in Bloomington, he met his future spouse, Julia Lesage, a fellow graduate student.

== Career ==
After earning a PhD in comparative literature, Kleinhans found temporary teaching jobs at Chicago State University (fall 1974–fall 1975) and Northeastern Illinois University (winter 1976–winter 1977). In spring 1977, Northwestern University's Radio/Television/Film Department hired him to teach courses on contemporary film theory and experimental film. In fall of that year, he started a tenure-track line at Northwestern as an assistant professor and taught "introductory courses in microcomputer graphics, photography, film and video making, media literacy, popular culture; [and] advanced courses in production in aesthetics, film/tv theory, mass culture theory, experimental film and video, Latin America media." He also shepherded over 40 dissertations. He was subsequently tenured and promoted to associate professor. After 32 years at Northwestern, he retired (2009) and became an associate professor emeritus.

Aside from his long tenure at Northwestern, Kleinhans is best known for his part in the founding and editing of Jump Cut, a media-studies journal. He, Julia Lesage, and John Hess conceived Jump Cut as their time at Indiana University was coming to an end. The first issue was released in 1974. The three edited it collectively until the deaths of Hess and Kleinhans. As stated in an editorial in the first issue, Jump Cut's principal goal was:

...we want to develop a political film criticism; that is, a film criticism which does not accept as binding the bourgeois idea that art is somehow separate and detached from the social life of women and men. Films often entertain, but, more importantly, they manipulate our image of people, of our society, of our world. We feel that it is important to reveal this manipulation in our most popular and successful films. We stand for a political film criticism because understanding film has meaning only when we are also trying to change the world.

Jump Cut was printed in tabloid form from 1974 to 2001, when it made the transition to an online publication as ejumpcut.org.

== Later life and death ==
During his time teaching in Evanston, Kleinhans continued to live in Chicago. After retiring from Northwestern in 2009 as an associate professor, he moved to Eugene, Oregon where his spouse had long taught at the University of Oregon. He died of heart failure after a brief illness on December 14, 2017.
