= Jeremy G. Butler =

American television and film scholar

- Born: 1954 (age 71–72)
- Occupation: Scholar of television, film, author, radio show host

Academic background
- Education: Brown University (B.A.); Northwestern University (M.A., PhD)

Academic work
- Discipline: Film, television studies
- Institutions: University of Alabama; Northwestern University; University of Arizona

Jeremy G. Butler (born 1954) is a scholar of television and film, an author, and radio show host on Alabama Public Radio. He is a professor emeritus of film studies at the University of Alabama. Butler has also taught at Northwestern University and the University of Arizona. In 1991, he founded the still-active Screen-L mailing list for academic film and television studies. Butler also created and maintains ScreenSite for film/TV studies and ScreenLex, a pronunciation guide.

His University of Alabama profile page says he has a B.A. from Brown University and received an M.A. and PhD from Northwestern University.

Much of his work focuses on television studies. He has written on various subjects including television, Miami Vice, and film scholar Chuck Kleinhans. He wrote a book on television style. He also authored the textbook Television: Visual Storytelling and Screen Culture. He hosts the show All Things Acoustic on Alabama Public Radio.

== Bibliography ==
- The Sitcom (2019)
- Television Style (2009)
- Television: Critical Methods and Applications, four editions 1994–2012, fifth edition 2018 retitled Television: Visual Storytelling and Screen Culture
- Star Texts: Image and Performance in Film and Television (1992)
