= Fred Taylor (cricketer) =

English cricketer

Fred Taylor (1891 – 4 July 1968) was an English cricketer active from 1920 to 1922 who played for Lancashire. He was born in Oldham and died in Clitheroe. He appeared in 15 first-class matches as a lefthanded batsman who bowled left arm medium pace. He scored 188 runs with a highest score of 29* and held seven catches. He took 40 wickets with a best analysis of six for 65.
