= Fred Taylor (footballer, born 1877) =

English footballer (1877–after 1897)

Personal information
- Date of birth: 1877
- Place of birth: Grimsby, England
- Position: Wing half

Senior career*
Years	Team	Apps	(Gls)
1896–1898	Grimsby All Saints		
1898	Grimsby Town	1	(0)
1898–1???	Grimsby All Saints		
- * Club domestic league appearances and goals

Fred Taylor (1877 – after 1897) was an English professional footballer who played as a wing half.
