= Orange Curtain =

Unofficial boundary between Orange and Los Angeles counties in California

Flags of the two counties

The Orange Curtain is a local term for the border between Orange County and Los Angeles County in the U.S. state of California. It is a sometimes derogatory, sometimes lighthearted term that is used to describe Orange County's more conservative and suburban population as compared to the more liberal and urban population of Los Angeles.

The phrase is a wordplay on the so-called Iron Curtain, which separated communist and capitalist Europe.

According to Colleen Cotter, "Because [Orange County] has a reputation for political conservatism, people from Northern California especially worry about what happens 'Behind the Orange Curtain'."

The Orange Curtain began from the fact that between 1890 and 1950, Orange County was wholly white and "the region's predominately Irish settling also embraced an ideology of small government.

Following the 2018 midterm election cycle, in which liberal Democrats were elected to all seven congressional seats in Orange County, comments arose suggesting the collapse of the Orange Curtain. A Republican Party political consultant even admitted, "Orange County was different. It was, as we called it, 'the orange curtain' and it has now fallen."
