= Jump Cut (journal) =

American media-studies journal

- Discipline: Film, television, media
- Language: English
- Edited by: Julia Lesage

Publication details
- History: 1974 to present
- Publisher: Jump Cut Associates (United States)

Standard abbreviations
- ISO 4: Jump Cut

Indexing
- ISSN: 0146-5546
- OCLC no.: 613432664

Links
- Journal homepage

Jump Cut: A Review of Contemporary Media is an American journal covering the analysis of film, television, video, and related media. Established in 1974 by John Hess, Chuck Kleinhans (Northwestern University), and Julia Lesage (University of Oregon), it takes its name from the jump cut, a film editing technique in which an abrupt visual change occurs. The publication's stated goal is to approach its subject from a "nonsectarian left, feminist, and anti-imperialist" perspective.

== History ==
Hess, Kleinhans, and Lesage met in Bloomington, Indiana while they were attending graduate school at Indiana University, circa 1970. Kleinhans remembers, "[W]e were actually sitting having a coffee in the university library and saying, 'We should start a film journal,' because John published something in Film Quarterly and Julia and I had published something too." After formulating the journal's principles and gathering articles during 1973, Jump Cut's first issue was released in 1974. Each editor contributed $1,000 toward each issue so that they could be free of advertising. Costs were kept low by publishing on newsprint in tabloid format and typing the copy on an electric typewriter (instead of having it typeset). Distribution was initially done by volunteers driving copies to newsstands in Chicago—where Kleinhans and Lesage took college-teaching jobs—and San Francisco/Berkeley, California—where Hess settled.

Jump Cut was published in print until 2001; thereafter it began publishing online, and all issues are available on its website and the Internet Archive.

== See also ==
- Political cinema
