= Journal of Film and Video =

- Discipline: Film studies, Television studies
- Language: English

Publication details
- Former names: Journal of the University Film Producers Association, Journal of the University Film Association, Journal of the University Film and Video Association
- Publisher: University of Illinois Press for the University Film and Video Association (United States)

Standard abbreviations
- ISO 4: J. Film Video

Indexing
- ISSN: 0742-4671 (print); 1934-6018 (web)

Links
- Journal homepage

The Journal of Film and Video (JFV) is the official academic journal of the University Film and Video Association. It presents research on film and media history, aesthetics, industry practices, and cultural significance. It also features articles of interest to practitioners involved in film and video production, as well as teachers and students engaged in the study of film and media.

The journal is published by the University of Illinois Press, and the current editor is Cynthia Baron, Bowling Green State University. JFV is published in print and can be accessed digitally via Project MUSE, the Scholarly Publishing Collective, and JSTOR. Starting in 2023, four articles each year are open access. JFV gives authors the opportunity to illustrate their discussions with selected fair-use audiovisual material.

JFV seeks to publish “evidence-based research that is attentive to textual operations, material factors, and questions of cultural specificity.” The journal is interested in “research that contextualizes individual productions and the work of creative laborers, … case studies from intersectional and interdisciplinary perspectives, [and] … in-depth research that sheds light on the conception, production, distribution, exhibition, and/or reception of film and media in all its various forms”.

Robert Wagner, editor of the journal from 1956 to 1976, described the ways in which it advanced the study of film and video, saying, “The specific reflections are like facets from a prism that make this subject a many-splendored thing: filmmaking; how to teach film; the history of film; film theory; the social effects of film; film as art; film as science; film as education; film as communication; the documentary film; film and television; international film events; and many others.”

== Title History ==
- 1949-1967: Journal of the University Film Producers Association
- 1968-1981: Journal of the University Film Association
- 1982-1983: Journal of the University Film and Video Association
- 1984-present: Journal of Film and Video

== See also ==
- List of film periodicals
