= University Film and Video Association =

The University Film and Video Association (UFVA) is an organization of scholars, filmmakers, and media-makers that is focused on “where media production and writing meet history, theory, and criticism”. It is based in the United States and has members throughout the world.

UFVA holds two annual conferences, one virtual and one in-person, and publishes the Journal of Film and Video. The journal presents research on cinema and media history, aesthetics, industry practices, and cultural significance. UFVA includes a documentary working group, committee on freedom of expression and academic freedom, and caucuses that work together on areas such as new media, screenwriting, and the entertainment industry. UFVA founded the non-profit University Film and Video Foundation in 1957. Both entities sponsor awards, grants, and fellowships for filmmakers, teachers, and students. The UFVA site features faculty and filmmaking resources.

== History ==
UFVA was founded in 1947 as the University Film Producers Association. It became the University Film Association in 1968 and the University Film and Video Association in 1981. Today, UFVA serves as the professional organization for academics producing and studying film and media, and it provides adjudication and peer review opportunities for independent artists and scholars around the world. UFVA members include scholars and practitioners whereas other academic organizations such as The Society for Cinema and Media Studies primarily serves cinema and media scholars.

UFVA is committed to the exercise of academic freedom and freedom of expression. The organization's official statement from 2025 emphasizes that its members “support all faculty and call on institutions of Higher Learning to support those who are unjustly targeted for exercising these freedoms”.

== Conference ==
UFVA hosts an annual summer conference and, as of 2025, an annual winter virtual conference designed to facilitate the participation of graduate students and underfunded faculty as well as international artists and scholars. Attendees screen new and work-in-progress films, present papers, mount new media exhibits, and hold staged readings of unproduced screenplays. The in-person conferences are hosted in various North American cities.

== Journal of Film and Video ==
The UFVA's official journal, the Journal of Film and Video (JFV), began publication in 1949, as the Journal of the University Film Producers Association. The double-blind, peer-reviewed journal is published by the University of Illinois Press. In 2023, JFV editor Cynthia Baron described the journal as aiming to “benefit UFVA members, the Journal’s wider readership, and the broader field”.
