= Journal of Cinema and Media Studies =

- Discipline: Film studies, television studies
- Language: English
- Edited by: Bo Ruberg; Elizabeth Ellcessor

Publication details
- Former names: Cinema Journal; The Journal of the Society of Cinematologists
- History: 1961–present
- Publisher: University of Michigan Press (United States)
- Frequency: 5 issues annually

Standard abbreviations
- ISO 4: J. Cine. Media Stud.

Indexing
- ISSN: 0009-7101 (print); 1527-2087 (web)
- LCCN: 75649099
- JSTOR: 00097101
- OCLC no.: 02244743

Links
- Journal homepage; Journal page at publisher's website; Online access at Project MUSE

The Journal of Cinema and Media Studies (formerly Cinema Journal and The Journal of the Society of Cinematologists) is the official academic journal of the Society for Cinema and Media Studies (formerly the Society for Cinema Studies). It covers film studies, television studies, media studies, visual arts, cultural studies, film and media history, and moving image studies and is published by the University of Michigan Press.

== History ==
The journal began publishing in 1961 as The Journal of the Society of Cinematologists—publishing research from the organization that would become SCS and then SCMS. In 1966, it evolved into Cinema Journal. It remained so named until October 2018 when it became The Journal of Cinema and Media Studies to better align itself with the name of its host organization. Several collections have been published:

- The Journal of The Society of Cinematologists: Volume I and II 1961-1962, ed. unknown
- The Journal of The Society of Cinematologists: Volume III 1963, ed. Norman N. Holland
- The Journal of The Society of Cinematologists: Volumes IV and V 1964-1965, ed. William J. Sloan
- Cinema Examined: Selections from Cinema Journal (1982), ed. Richard Dyer MacCann and Jack C. Ellis

== See also ==
- List of film periodicals
