= Society for Cinema and Media Studies =

Organization of professors and scholars

The Society for Cinema and Media Studies (formerly the Society for Cinema Studies) is an organization of professors and scholars. Its home office is at the University of Oklahoma, but it has members throughout the world.

SCMS holds an annual conference and publishes the Journal of Cinema and Media Studies (formerly Cinema Journal), a periodical featuring articles on media from a critical (i.e., not empirical) perspective. This includes, but is not limited to, film studies, television studies, media studies, visual arts, cultural studies, film and media history, and moving image studies.

Its stated goals are:

The Society for Cinema and Media Studies is the leading scholarly organization in the United States dedicated to promoting a broad understanding of film, television, and related media through research and teaching grounded in the contemporary humanities tradition.

Along with the University Film and Video Association, it is one of the principal academic organizations for studying media.

== History ==
SCMS was founded in 1959 as the Society of Cinematologists. It became the Society for Cinema Studies in 1969.

It added "media" to its name in 2002 to account for the work of its members outside of the film studies discipline.

== Conference locations ==
- 2027 Montreal
- 2026 Chicago
- 2025 Chicago
- 2024 Boston
- 2023 Denver
- 2022 online-only
- 2021 planned as an online-only conference
- 2020 Denver (canceled due to the COVID-19 pandemic)
- 2019 Seattle
- 2018 Toronto
- 2017 Chicago
- 2016 Atlanta
- 2015 Montreal
- 2014 Seattle
- 2013 Chicago
- 2012 Boston
- 2011 New Orleans
- 2010 Los Angeles
- 2009 Tokyo (canceled due to the H1N1 virus)
- 2008 Philadelphia
- 2007 Chicago
- 2006 Vancouver
- 2005 London
- 2004 Atlanta
- 2003 Minneapolis
- 2002 Denver
- 2001 Washington, DC
- 2000 Chicago
- 1999 West Palm Beach
- 1998 San Diego (La Jolla)
- 1997 Ottawa
