= Economic law (disambiguation) =

Economic law may refer to:

- Economic law, a legal system that governs relations associated with economic activities
- Commercial law, laws that govern business and commercial transactions
- Law of economics

See also Law and economics
