= Global catastrophic risk =

Hypothetical global-scale disaster risk

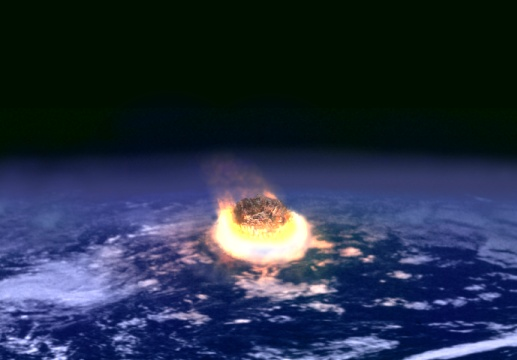
Artist's impression of a major asteroid impact. An asteroid caused the extinction of the non-avian dinosaurs.

A global catastrophic risk or a doomsday scenario is a hypothetical event that could damage human well-being on a global scale, endangering or even destroying modern civilization. Existential risk is a related term limited to events that could cause full-blown human extinction or permanently and drastically curtail humanity's existence or potential.

In the 21st century, a number of academic and non-profit organizations have been established to research global catastrophic and existential risks, formulate potential mitigation measures, and either advocate for or implement these measures.

== Definition and classification ==
Scope–severity grid from Bostrom's paper "Existential Risk Prevention as Global Priority"

=== Defining global catastrophic risks ===
The term global catastrophic risk "lacks a sharp definition", and generally refers (loosely) to a risk that could inflict "serious damage to human well-being on a global scale".

Humanity has suffered large catastrophes before. Some of these have caused serious damage but were only local in scope—e.g. the Black Death may have resulted in the deaths of a third of Europe's population, 10% of the global population at the time. Some were global, but were not as severe—e.g. the 1918 influenza pandemic killed an estimated 3–6% of the world's population. Most global catastrophic risks would not be so intense as to kill the majority of life on earth, but even if one did, the ecosystem and humanity would eventually recover (in contrast to existential risks).

Similarly, in Catastrophe: Risk and Response, Richard Posner singles out and groups together events that bring about "utter overthrow or ruin" on a global, rather than a "local or regional" scale. Posner highlights such events as worthy of special attention on cost–benefit grounds because they could directly or indirectly jeopardize the survival of the human race as a whole.

=== Defining existential risks ===
Existential risks are defined as "risks that threaten the destruction of humanity's long-term potential." The instantiation of an existential risk (an existential catastrophe) would either cause outright human extinction or irreversibly lock in a drastically inferior state of affairs. Existential risks are a sub-class of global catastrophic risks, where the damage is not only global but also terminal and permanent, preventing recovery and thereby affecting both current and all future generations.

==== Non-extinction risks ====
While extinction is the most obvious way in which humanity's long-term potential could be destroyed, there are others, including unrecoverable collapse and unrecoverable dystopia. A disaster severe enough to cause the permanent, irreversible collapse of human civilisation would constitute an existential catastrophe, even if it fell short of extinction. Similarly, if humanity fell under a totalitarian regime, and there were no chance of recovery, then such a dystopia would also be an existential catastrophe. Bryan Caplan writes that "perhaps an eternity of totalitarianism would be worse than extinction". (George Orwell's novel Nineteen Eighty-Four suggests an example.) A dystopian scenario shares the key features of extinction and unrecoverable collapse of civilization: before the catastrophe humanity faced a vast range of bright futures to choose from; after the catastrophe, humanity is locked forever in a terrible state.

== Potential sources of risk ==
Potential global catastrophic risks are conventionally classified as anthropogenic or non-anthropogenic hazards. Examples of non-anthropogenic risks are an asteroid or comet impact event, a supervolcanic eruption, a natural pandemic, a lethal gamma-ray burst, a geomagnetic storm from a coronal mass ejection destroying electronic equipment, natural long-term climate change, hostile extraterrestrial life, or the Sun transforming into a red giant star and possibly engulfing the Earth billions of years in the future.

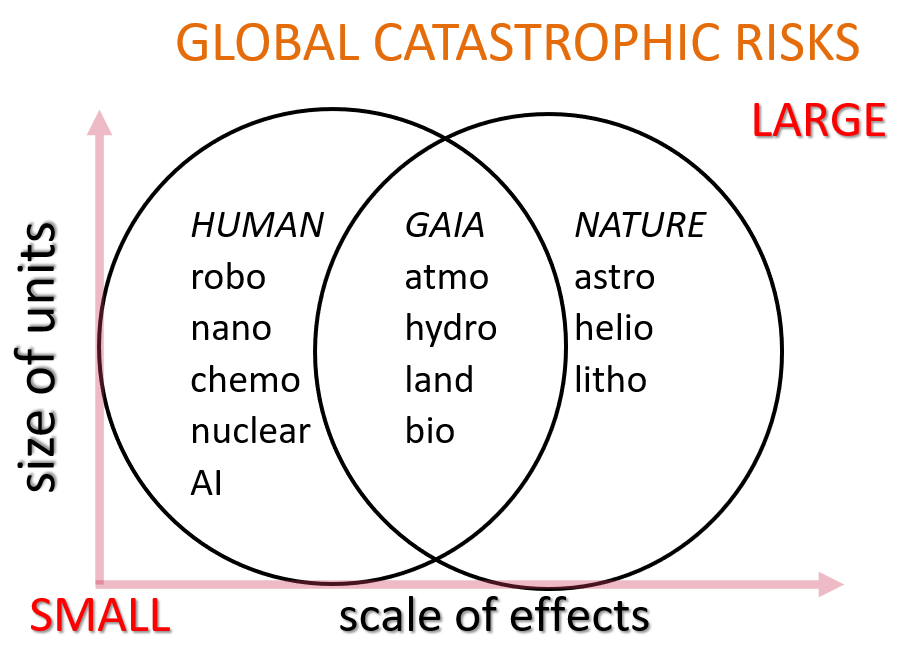
Arrangement of global catastrophic risks into three sets according to whether they are largely human-caused, human influences upon nature, or purely natural

Anthropogenic risks are those caused by humans and include those related to technology, governance, and the environment. Technological risks include the creation of artificial intelligence misaligned with human goals, biotechnology, and nanotechnology. Insufficient or malign global governance creates risks in the social and political domain, such as global war and nuclear holocaust, biological warfare and bioterrorism using genetically modified organisms, cyberwarfare and cyberterrorism destroying critical infrastructure like the electrical grid, or radiological warfare using weapons such as large cobalt bombs. Other global catastrophic risks concerning the environment include man-made climate change, environmental degradation, ecosystem collapse, critical resource depletion such as famine, water scarcity, or the loss of fossil fuels, and human overpopulation or underpopulation. Experts are also increasingly worried about cascading risks, the use of AI for bioengineering or in nuclear weapons systems, and a variety of other threats.

== Methodological challenges ==
Research into the nature and mitigation of global catastrophic risks and existential risks is subject to a unique set of challenges and, as a result, is not easily subjected to the usual standards of scientific rigour. For instance, it is neither feasible nor ethical to study these risks experimentally. Carl Sagan expressed this with regards to nuclear war: "Understanding the long-term consequences of nuclear war is not a problem amenable to experimental verification". Moreover, many catastrophic risks change rapidly as technology advances and background conditions, such as geopolitical conditions, change. Another challenge is the general difficulty of accurately predicting the future over long timescales, especially for anthropogenic risks which depend on complex human political, economic and social systems. In addition to known and tangible risks, unforeseeable black swan extinction events may occur, presenting an additional methodological problem.

=== Lack of historical precedent ===
Humanity has never suffered an existential catastrophe and if one were to occur, it would necessarily be unprecedented. Therefore, existential risks pose unique challenges to prediction, even more than other long-term events, because of observation selection effects. Unlike with most events, the failure of a complete extinction event to occur in the past is not evidence against their likelihood in the future, because every world that has experienced such an extinction event has gone unobserved by humanity. Regardless of civilization-collapsing events' frequency, no civilization observes existential risks in its history. These anthropic issues may partly be avoided by looking at evidence that does not have such selection effects, such as asteroid impact craters on the Moon, or directly evaluating the likely impact of new technology.

To understand the dynamics of an unprecedented, unrecoverable global civilizational collapse (a type of existential risk), it may be instructive to study the various local civilizational collapses that have occurred throughout human history. For instance, civilizations such as the Roman Empire have ended in a loss of centralized governance and a major civilization-wide loss of infrastructure and advanced technology. However, these examples demonstrate that societies appear to be fairly resilient to catastrophe; for example, Medieval Europe survived the Black Death without suffering anything resembling a civilization collapse despite losing 25 to 50 percent of its population.

=== Incentives and coordination ===
There are economic reasons that can explain why so little effort is going into global catastrophic risk reduction. First, it is speculative and may never happen, so many people focus on other more pressing issues. It is also a global public good, so we should expect it to be undersupplied by markets. Even if a large nation invested in risk mitigation measures, that nation would enjoy only a small fraction of the benefit of doing so. Furthermore, global catastrophic risk reduction can be thought of as an intergenerational global public good. Since most of the hypothetical benefits of the reduction would be enjoyed by future generations, and though these future people would perhaps be willing to pay substantial sums for risk reduction, no mechanism for such a transaction exists.

=== Cognitive biases ===
Numerous cognitive biases can influence people's judgment of the importance of existential risks, including scope insensitivity, hyperbolic discounting, the availability heuristic, the conjunction fallacy, the affect heuristic, and the overconfidence effect.

Scope insensitivity influences how bad people consider the extinction of the human race to be. For example, when people are motivated to donate money to altruistic causes, the quantity they are willing to give does not increase linearly with the magnitude of the issue: people are roughly as willing to prevent the deaths of 200,000 or 2,000 birds. Similarly, people are often more concerned about threats to individuals than to larger groups.

Eliezer Yudkowsky theorizes that scope neglect plays a role in public perception of existential risks:

Substantially larger numbers, such as 500 million deaths, and especially qualitatively different scenarios such as the extinction of the entire human species, seem to trigger a different mode of thinking... People who would never dream of hurting a child hear of existential risk, and say, "Well, maybe the human species doesn't really deserve to survive".

All past predictions of human extinction have proven to be false. To some, this makes future warnings seem less credible. Nick Bostrom argues that the absence of human extinction in the past is weak evidence that there will be no human extinction in the future, due to survivor bias and other anthropic effects.

Sociobiologist E. O. Wilson argued that: "The reason for this myopic fog, evolutionary biologists contend, is that it was actually advantageous during all but the last few millennia of the two million years of existence of the genus Homo... A premium was placed on close attention to the near future and early reproduction, and little else. Disasters of a magnitude that occur only once every few centuries were forgotten or transmuted into myth."

== Proposed mitigation ==
=== Multi-layer defense ===
Defense in depth is a useful framework for categorizing risk mitigation measures into three layers of defense:

1. Prevention: Reducing the probability of a catastrophe occurring in the first place. Example: Measures to prevent outbreaks of new highly infectious diseases.
2. Response: Preventing the scaling of a catastrophe to the global level. Example: Measures to prevent escalation of a small-scale nuclear exchange into an all-out nuclear war.
3. Resilience: Increasing humanity's resilience (against extinction) when faced with global catastrophes. Example: Measures to increase food security during a nuclear winter.

Human extinction is most likely when all three defenses are weak, that is, "by risks we are unlikely to prevent, unlikely to successfully respond to, and unlikely to be resilient against".

The unprecedented nature of existential risks poses a special challenge in designing risk mitigation measures since humanity will not be able to learn from a track record of previous events.

=== Funding ===
Some researchers argue that both research and other initiatives relating to existential risk are underfunded. Nick Bostrom states that more research has been done on Star Trek, snowboarding, or dung beetles than on existential risks. Bostrom's comparisons have been criticized as "high-handed". As of 2020, the Biological Weapons Convention organization had an annual budget of US$1.4 million.

=== Survival planning ===
Some scholars propose the establishment on Earth of one or more self-sufficient, remote, permanently occupied settlements specifically created for the purpose of surviving a global disaster. Economist Robin Hanson argues that a refuge permanently housing as few as 100 people would significantly improve the chances of human survival during a range of global catastrophes.

Food storage has been proposed globally, but the monetary cost would be high. Furthermore, it would likely contribute to the current millions of deaths per year due to malnutrition. In 2022, a team led by David Denkenberger modeled the cost-effectiveness of resilient foods to artificial general intelligence (AGI) safety and found "~98-99% confidence" for a higher marginal impact of work on resilient foods. Some survivalists stock survival retreats with multiple-year food supplies.

The Svalbard Global Seed Vault is buried 400 feet (120 m) inside a mountain on an island in the Arctic. It is designed to hold 2.5 billion seeds from more than 100 countries as a precaution to preserve the world's crops. The surrounding rock is −6 °C (21 °F) (as of 2015) but the vault is kept at −18 °C (0 °F) by refrigerators powered by locally sourced coal.

More speculatively, if society continues to function and if the biosphere remains habitable, calorie needs for the present human population might in theory be met during an extended absence of sunlight, given sufficient advance planning. Conjectured solutions include growing mushrooms on the dead plant biomass left in the wake of the catastrophe, converting cellulose to sugar, or feeding natural gas to methane-digesting bacteria.

=== Global catastrophic risks and global governance ===
Insufficient global governance creates risks in the social and political domain, but the governance mechanisms develop more slowly than technological and social change. There are concerns from governments, the private sector, and the general public about the lack of governance mechanisms to efficiently deal with risks, negotiate and adjudicate between diverse and conflicting interests. This is further underlined by an understanding of the interconnectedness of global systemic risks. In absence or anticipation of global governance, national governments can act individually to better understand, mitigate and prepare for global catastrophes.

=== Climate emergency plans ===
In 2018, the Club of Rome called for greater climate change action and published its Climate Emergency Plan, which proposes ten action points to limit global average temperature increase to 1.5 degrees Celsius. Further, in 2019, the Club published the more comprehensive Planetary Emergency Plan.

There is evidence to suggest that collectively engaging with the emotional experiences that emerge during contemplating the vulnerability of the human species within the context of climate change allows for these experiences to be adaptive. When collective engaging with and processing emotional experiences is supportive, this can lead to growth in resilience, psychological flexibility, tolerance of emotional experiences, and community engagement.

=== Space colonization ===
Space colonization is a proposed alternative to improve the odds of surviving an extinction scenario. Solutions of this scope may require megascale engineering.

Astrophysicist Stephen Hawking advocated colonizing other planets within the Solar System once technology progresses sufficiently, in order to improve the chance of human survival from planet-wide events such as global thermonuclear war.

== Organizations ==
The Bulletin of the Atomic Scientists (est. 1945) is one of the oldest global risk organizations, founded after the public became alarmed by the potential of atomic warfare in the aftermath of WWII. It studies risks associated with nuclear war and energy and famously maintains the Doomsday Clock established in 1947. The Foresight Institute (est. 1986) examines the risks of nanotechnology and its benefits. It was one of the earliest organizations to study the unintended consequences of otherwise harmless technology gone haywire at a global scale. It was founded by K. Eric Drexler who postulated "grey goo".

Beginning after 2000, a growing number of scientists, philosophers and tech billionaires created organizations devoted to studying global risks both inside and outside of academia.

Independent non-governmental organizations (NGOs) include the Machine Intelligence Research Institute (est. 2000), which aims to reduce the risk of a catastrophe caused by artificial intelligence, with donors including Peter Thiel and Jed McCaleb. The Nuclear Threat Initiative (est. 2001) seeks to reduce global threats from nuclear, biological and chemical threats, and containment of damage after an event. It maintains a nuclear material security index. The Lifeboat Foundation (est. 2009) funds research into preventing a technological catastrophe. Most of the research money funds projects at universities. The Global Catastrophic Risk Institute (est. 2011) is a US-based non-profit, non-partisan think tank founded by Seth Baum and Tony Barrett. GCRI does research and policy work across various risks, including artificial intelligence, nuclear war, climate change, and asteroid impacts. The Global Challenges Foundation (est. 2012), based in Stockholm and founded by Laszlo Szombatfalvy, releases a yearly report on the state of global risks. The Future of Life Institute (est. 2014) works to reduce extreme, large-scale risks from transformative technologies, as well as steer the development and use of these technologies to benefit all life, through grantmaking, policy advocacy in the United States, European Union and United Nations, and educational outreach. Elon Musk, Vitalik Buterin and Jaan Tallinn are some of its biggest donors.

University-based organizations included the Future of Humanity Institute (est. 2005) which researched the questions of humanity's long-term future, particularly existential risk. It was founded by Nick Bostrom and was based at Oxford University. The Centre for the Study of Existential Risk (est. 2012) is a Cambridge University-based organization which studies four major technological risks: artificial intelligence, biotechnology, global warming and warfare. All are man-made risks, as Huw Price explained to the AFP news agency, "It seems a reasonable prediction that some time in this or the next century intelligence will escape from the constraints of biology". He added that when this happens "we're no longer the smartest things around," and will risk being at the mercy of "machines that are not malicious, but machines whose interests don't include us." Stephen Hawking was an acting adviser. The Millennium Alliance for Humanity and the Biosphere is a Stanford University-based organization focusing on many issues related to global catastrophe by bringing together members of academia in the humanities. It was founded by Paul Ehrlich, among others. Stanford University also has the Center for International Security and Cooperation focusing on political cooperation to reduce global catastrophic risk. The Center for Security and Emerging Technology was established in January 2019 at Georgetown's Walsh School of Foreign Service and will focus on policy research of emerging technologies with an initial emphasis on artificial intelligence. They received a grant of 55M USD from Good Ventures as suggested by Open Philanthropy.

Other risk assessment groups are based in or are part of governmental organizations. The World Health Organization (WHO) includes a division called the Global Alert and Response (GAR) which monitors and responds to global epidemic crisis. GAR helps member states with training and coordination of response to epidemics. The United States Agency for International Development (USAID) has its Emerging Pandemic Threats Program which aims to prevent and contain naturally generated pandemics at their source. The Lawrence Livermore National Laboratory has a division called the Global Security Principal Directorate which researches on behalf of the government issues such as bio-security and counter-terrorism.

== See also ==
- Artificial intelligence arms race – Type of international competition
- Climate engineering – Deliberate and large-scale intervention in Earth's climate system
- Community resilience – Concept in crisis management
- Extreme risk – Low-probability risk of very bad outcomes
- Fermi paradox – Discrepancy of the lack of evidence for alien life despite its apparent likelihood
- Foresight (psychology) – Behavior-based backcasting & forecasting factors
- Future of Earth – Long-term future of planet Earth
- Future of the Solar System
- Global Risks Report – Publication of the World Economic Forum
- Great Filter – Hypothesis of barriers to forming interstellar civilizations
- Holocene extinction – Ongoing extinction event caused by human activity
- Impact event – Collision of two astronomical objects
- List of global issues – List of environmental and other issues affecting life on Earth
- Nuclear proliferation – Spread of nuclear weapons
- Outside Context Problem, as defined in Excession – 1996 Book by Iain M. Banks
- Planetary boundaries – Limits to safe impact on the Earth ecology
- Rare events - Events that occurs with low frequency, often with a widespread effect which might destabilize systems
- Risk of astronomical suffering – Scenarios of large amounts of future suffering
- Societal collapse – Fall of a complex human society
- Speculative evolution – Science fiction genre
- Survivalism – Movement of individuals or households preparing for emergencies and natural disasters
- Tail risk – Risk of statistically extreme events
- The Precipice: Existential Risk and the Future of Humanity – 2020 book by Toby Ord
- The Sixth Extinction: An Unnatural History – 2014 nonfiction book by Elizabeth Kolbert
- Timeline of the far future – Scientific projections regarding the far future
- Triple planetary crisis – Three intersecting global environmental crises
- Vulnerable world hypothesis – Existential risk concept
- World Scientists' Warning to Humanity – 1992 document on human carbon footprint
