= Schurz =

Schurz (German pronunciation: [ˈʃʊʁts]) may refer to:

- Schurz, Nevada, a census-designated place in Mineral County, Nevada, United States
- Mount Schurz

== People with the surname ==
- Barbara Schurz (born 1973), artist
- Carl Schurz (1829–1906), German revolutionary and American statesman, reformer, and general
  - Carl Schurz Park
  - Carl Schurz High School, a public secondary school, Chicago, Illinois
- Margarethe Schurz

== See also ==
- Schurz Communications, American radio, television, cable TV and newspaper media group
  - Schurz Communications, Incorporated v. Federal Communications Commission and United States of America
- Schurtz, spelling variation
