= Donald McGannon =

Donald H. McGannon (September 9, 1920 – May 23, 1984) was a broadcasting industry executive during the formative years of the television industry in the United States. As chairman of the Westinghouse Broadcasting Company, McGannon was a devoted advocate of broadcasting's potential for good and worked to improve the standards of radio and television broadcasting.

== Early career ==
Born September 9, 1920 in New York City, McGannon graduated from Fordham University and Fordham Law School, with a brief interruption when he enlisted in the Army and married Patricia Burke. Following law school, McGannon practiced law until 1952, when his interest in broadcasting led him to become general manager and assistant director of the DuMont Television Network. Three years later, McGannon's mentor, Chris Witting, brought McGannon to the Westinghouse Broadcasting Company as president, a position he held for more than twenty five years. Westinghouse was, at the time, one of the largest television station ownership groups in the country.

== The voice of responsibility in broadcasting ==
At Westinghouse, McGannon insisted on dropping cigarette advertising despite protests from network officials. He was also a primary force behind the “prime-time access rule,” which the FCC instituted in 1971 in order to return a portion of each evening's prime time schedule to local stations (rather than the networks). Donald McGannon was also the principal force behind Westinghouse developing its own standards of copy and program acceptance, because he felt the NAB code standards were not sufficient.

Often called an iconoclast, McGannon used his prominence in broadcasting to influence the regulations, standards, and practices of broadcasting. He was a vocal advocate of social responsibility in broadcasting and worked to educate the public through television.

In 1968, Donald McGannon was awarded the Trustee Award of the National Academy of Television Arts and Sciences, the Television Academy's highest honor, given in recognition of unusual or enduring achievements to the arts or sciences of television. Other winners of this award have included Edward R. Murrow, Bob Hope, Walter Cronkite, and Ted Turner. McGannon was also a huge influence on education, as a trustee or adviser to several universities, and was a founding director of Sacred Heart University, as well as serving on the Board of Directors of Radio Free Europe.

Donald McGannon died in 1984, leaving behind his wife Patricia and 13 children. He died in Chester, Connecticut.

== Legacy ==
In 1986, public interest media policy advocate Everett C. Parker founded the Donald McGannon Communication Research Center at Fordham University in honor of Donald McGannon and his commitment to social responsibility in the media. The center's mission is to conduct, support, reward, and disseminate research that informs the communications policymaking process and ethical decision-making in the management of media institutions. Each year, the McGannon Center awards the Donald McGannon Award for Social and Ethical Relevance in Communications Policy Research to the best book addressing issues of communications policy or ethics published in the previous year.

Donald McGannon's legacy also lives on in the annual Donald H. McGannon Award awarded each year by the Office of Communication of the United Church of Christ to an individual who has made special contributions to advancing opportunities for women and people of color in the media, as well as in the annual Donald McGannon Award presented each year by the National Urban League to individuals who have demonstrated a commitment to ideals and beliefs in equal opportunity.
