= Michael Y. Scudder =

American judge (born 1971)

Michael Scudder
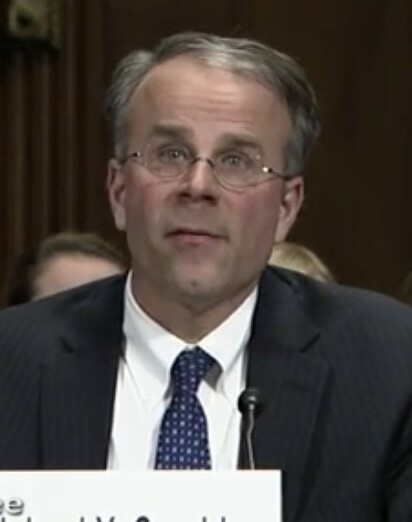
- Scudder in 2018

Judge of the United States Court of Appeals for the Seventh Circuit
- Incumbent
- Assumed office May 21, 2018
- Appointed by: Donald Trump
- Preceded by: Richard Posner

Personal details
- Born: Michael Yale Scudder Jr. 1971 (age 54–55) Fort Wayne, Indiana, U.S.
- Spouse: Sarah Schoenle (m. 1993)
- Education: Saint Joseph's College (BBA); Northwestern University (JD)

Michael Yale Scudder Jr. (born 1971) is a United States circuit judge of the United States Court of Appeals for the Seventh Circuit.

== Education and legal career ==
In 1989, Scudder graduated from Bishop Dwenger High School in Fort Wayne, Indiana. Scudder received his Bachelor of Business Administration from Saint Joseph's College as co-valedictorian, and his Juris Doctor in 1998 magna cum laude from the Northwestern University Pritzker School of Law, where he was inducted into the Order of the Coif. Scudder worked as an auditor for Ernst and Young before attending law school and is a Certified Public Accountant.

Following law school, Scudder served as a law clerk for Judge Paul V. Niemeyer of the United States Court of Appeals for the Fourth Circuit from 1998 to 1999, and then for Justice Anthony Kennedy of the Supreme Court of the United States from 1999 to 2000. Following his clerkships, he first worked as an attorney for two years at Jones Day in Cleveland, Ohio. He then served as: Assistant United States Attorney for the Southern District of New York from 2002 to 2006; counsel to the National Security team of the U.S. Department of Justice in 2006; associate counsel to President George W. Bush in the White House Counsel's office in 2007; and as the general counsel of the National Security Council from 2007 to 2009.

He served as a partner of Skadden, Arps, Slate, Meagher & Flom in Chicago, Illinois from 2009 to 2018. Additionally, he has taught at the Northwestern Pritzker School of Law and at the University of Chicago Law School.

== Federal judicial service ==
On February 12, 2018, President Donald Trump announced his intent to nominate Scudder to a seat on the United States Court of Appeals for the Seventh Circuit. On February 15, 2018, his nomination was sent to the Senate. President Trump nominated Scudder to the seat vacated by Judge Richard Posner, who retired on September 2, 2017. On March 21, 2018, a hearing on his nomination was held before the Senate Judiciary Committee. On April 19, 2018, his nomination was reported out of committee by a 21–0 vote. On May 14, 2018, the United States Senate confirmed his nomination by a 90–0 vote. Scudder received his commission on May 21, 2018.

== Personal life ==
On July 3, 1993, Scudder married Sarah Rose Schoenle in Allen County, Indiana. Scudder once served as vice chairman of the Board of Advisors of the Catholic Charities, Archdiocese of Chicago.

== See also ==
- List of law clerks for the first seat of the Supreme Court of the United States

Legal offices
Preceded by Richard Posner	Judge of the United States Court of Appeals for the Seventh Circuit; 2018–present	Incumbent
