= A Failure of Capitalism =

Book by Richard Posner

A Failure of Capitalism: The Crisis of '08 and the Descent into Depression
- Cover of the hardcover edition
- Author: Richard Posner
- Language: English
- Subject: Critique of laissez-faire capitalism
- Publisher: Harvard University Press
- Publication date: May 1, 2009
- Publication place: United States
- Media type: Print, e-book
- Pages: 368 pp. (1st edition)
- ISBN: 978-0674035140
- Followed by: The Crisis of Capitalist Democracy

A Failure of Capitalism: The Crisis of '08 and the Descent into Depression is a 2009 book by legal scholar Richard Posner. The text was initially published on May 1, 2009, by Harvard University Press. Posner criticizes President George W. Bush and his administration's policies and the response to the fiscal crisis, and moves away from his past well-known advocacy of free-market capitalism. The book has been primarily noted not for his criticism of progressive government policies, but rather his critique of laissez-faire capitalism and its ideologues.

The book has been received with generally good reviews from the press, including The New York Times, but the reception has not been universally positive.

== Synopsis ==
The primary argument of the book is that the United States went from a recession into a depression (the "D" word, as one reviewer calls it) in 2009, and Posner suggests several possible short-term and long-term solutions to this fiscal crisis. His thesis is not that government, politicians, or even bankers primarily caused this depression, but rather that the capitalist system is to blame for its faults.

Some of the causes of the depression that Posner cites are the lack of enforceable usury laws, which would discourage risky loans, the Federal Deposit Insurance Corporation (FDIC) and central banks taking risks, securitization of mortgages, illiquidity and insolvency of the banking system, the housing bubble, blindness to warning signs of a crisis, and the preconceptions of ideology.

Posner wraps up the book with a chapter containing several suggestions, including eventual re-regulation of the banking industry, but warns that "this is not the time" to do so—a long-term solution after the economy recovers—that can "wait calmer days." He also suggests putting off a reorganization of the Treasury and the Federal Reserve until a later time. In the meanwhile, he writes, "piecemeal reforms may be feasible and helpful." These include a halt on government marketing of home ownership, requiring banks and financial institutions to "disclose the full compensation of all senior executives", backloading of compensation, increasing marginal income tax rates on the highest incomes, and usury laws to discourage risky loans.

== Criticism of George W. Bush ==
The book is significant in Posner's criticism of President George W. Bush and his administration's policies and the response to the fiscal crisis. Part of the shock is due to Posner's longtime "conservative" views. Judge Posner was nominated to the Seventh Circuit by Ronald Reagan, but is "no party man."

Posner starts his criticism of Bush with a broad attack on his behavior in his final months as President:

The lame-duck president seemed uninterested and uninformed about economic matters and was unable to project an image of leadership and instead spent his final months in office in frequent trips abroad and in legacy-polishing while the domestic economy melted away.

— Richard Posner

Posner blames Bush for pushing policies, such as the "ownership society", a $10 trillion national debt and "the huge budget deficits run by the Bush administration", "prop[ping] up stock prices by keeping interest rates low," which were underlying causes of the crisis, as well as "Dithering" in late 2008. By the ownership society, Posner referred to the American Dream Down Payment Act of 2003 and other laws that made ownership easier.

Posner points out that Bush's proposed privatization of Social Security would have made the depression even more harmful. Posner states that one of the "lessons learned" is that the "blurred" line between "the government and the private sector ... in the Bush Administration" contributed to a lack of insight into the underlying problems. Even more so, "the emphatically pro-business philosophy of the Bush administration made the SEC too trusting of the securities industry." The bottom line is that "there might not have been a depression had it not been for the Bush administration's mismanagement of the economy."

== Criticism of capitalism and mainstream economists ==
Posner, famous for his advocacy of free markets, turns on free-market capitalism in this book: "the financial crisis is indeed a crisis of capitalism rather than a failure of government." Posner explicitly states that he has changed his mind, that in the words of economist Robert Lucas, "that macroeconomics in this original sense has succeeded." Posner states that:

What Bernanke and Greenspan and the academy can be blamed for is overconfidence in their understanding of how to prevent a depression and, as a result, a failure to attend to warning signs and a lack of preparedness.

— Posner

Posner points out that one of the causes of the depression was "blindness to warning signs" of a crisis. A few people had warned of problems, including analyst Meredith Whitney, investment advisers like Gary Shilling, Peter Schiff, and Marc Faber, and economists Stephen Roach, Robert Shiller, and Nouriel Roubini, and Brooksley Born, but they were ignored. He asserts that the "depression is a failure of capitalism".

This is the second and most powerful shock. The New York Times points out that:

It comes as something of a surprise that Posner, a doyen of the market-oriented law-and-economics movement, should deliver a roundhouse punch to the proposition that markets are self-correcting. It might also seem odd that a federal appellate judge (and University of Chicago law lecturer) would be among the first out of the gate with a comprehensive book on the financial crisis — if, that is, the judge were any other judge. But Posner is the late Daniel Patrick Moynihan’s successor as the country’s most omnivorous and independent-minded public intellectual.

— Jonathan Rauch, The New York Times

== Spreading the blame: critiques of Bill Clinton, Barack Obama, et al. ==
Posner also assigns part of the blame for the recession to the administration of Bill Clinton. He says they were to blame for pushing policies that created the housing bubble. The training and experience of several Clinton advisors, notably Robert Rubin, were tilted towards Wall Street, which he found to be ultimately dangerous. Likewise, Alan Greenspan, Clinton's appointee as chairman of the Federal Reserve, gets special blame for pushing low interest rates, which increased stock prices and led, in turn, to the bubbles in banking, stocks, and housing.

Posner sweeps a wide swath in assigning portions of the blame for causing the underlying recession to a variety of factors and persons. He praises the use of specific deterrence in shaming debtors, which, in his mind, has not been used enough recently. He faults the concept of limited liability for increasing risk. He points out the harmful focus on short-term profits at the expenses of long-term stability. Bad credit was, in Posner's words, given a "so what?" attitude.

Clinton and the Democratic leadership in Congress encouraged home ownership by people who had bad credit and should have, in Posner's view, remained tenants. Competition in the banking industry led to deregulation in Clinton's administration, and enactment of the Gramm–Leach–Bliley Act, which increased risk to the system. Posner is not alone in criticizing the Gramm–Leach–Bliley Act; some economists, including Nobel laureate Joseph Stiglitz also believe it led to the 2008 financial crisis. Encouraging the practice of "sweeps" by large investors (removing money from demand deposits into money market funds overnight) exacerbated the problem.

Preconceptions and ideology held by both sides of the spectrum, argues the book, prevented novel challenges to changing fiscal realities. Macroeconomics has not made use of chaos theory, and thus says Posner, the signal-to-noise ratio prevented a clear analysis and even created "blindness" and "misinformation" for policy analysts.

Posner went on the record against how Barack Obama's administration's Keynesian stimulus in the ARRA "could have been better designed," and specifically demurs against some of Obama's statements:

But the harassment of business over compensation policies, and the impending federal takeover of General Motors, are negatives: they increase the uncertainty of the business environment, which dampens the incentive to invest, and shift the balance between government and business in the management of economic activity too far in favour of the government.

— Richard A. Posner

Nonetheless, Posner points out that what is rational for an individual corporation may not be rational for the industry as a whole.

== Reception ==
Reviewing for The New York Times, Jonathan Rauch wrote that:

By the last page, not a single lazy generalization has survived Posner’s merciless scrutiny, not one populist cliché remains standing. “A Failure of Capitalism” clears away whole forests of cant but leaves readers at a loss as to where to go from here. In other words, it is only a starting point — but an indispensable one.

— Jonathan Rauch

The Huffington Post gave a long review, noting with a bit of schadenfreude that Posner had changed his views. Michael Casey, in a review published in the Irish Times, writes "Blaming the system is a cop-out.... Posner’s approach is far too deterministic", and further calls the book "[a]n incomplete analysis of a floundering social system."

In The Washington Post, Paul M. Barrett, an assistant managing editor of Business Week, writes that Posner seems to spread the blame too much, denigrates mere stupidity and "greed" as causes, and lacks "constructive proposals for reform...." Barrett points out how notable this book is, which is that "his critique is bracing, all the more so because it comes from a right-leaning thinker normally hostile to the ministrations of government bureaucrats."

The New York Review of Books said that "it is at best a partial success; it gets some things right and some things wrong, and the items on both sides of the ledger are important." In the Review, Nobel Prize–winning economist Robert Solow praises the author quite faintly:

I have to say that the prose in this book often reads as if it were written, or maybe dictated, in a great hurry. There is some unnecessary repetition, and many paragraphs spend more time than they should on digressions that seem to have occurred to the author in mid-thought. If not exactly chiseled, the prose is nevertheless lively, readable, and plainspoken. The haste may have been justified by the pace of the events he aims to describe and explain. Posner has an extraordinarily sharp mind, and what I take to be a lawyerly skill in argument. But I also have to say that, in some respects, his grasp of economic ideas is precarious.

— Robert M. Solow

Solow's review itself was notable to some degree, according to Brad DeLong, who critiqued Posner's logic along the way:

Yet while Posner insists on saving the appearance of individual rationality, he is willing to jettison the Chicago School's conclusion that markets are everywhere and always perfect. As Robert Solow observed: "If I had written that, it would not be news. From Richard Posner, it is." Abandoning the conclusion of market perfection opens the door to the idea that government needs to properly check, balance, and regulate markets in order to help them function as well as possible. But clinging to the assumption of individual rationality forces Posner’s view of what regulation is appropriate into a very awkward straightjacket.

In an interview with The Economist, Posner was forced to defend his use of the term "depression" and his move "to the centre..."

Forbes magazine printed the preface of the book as a measure of its importance.

In January 2010, The New Yorker revisited A Failure of Capitalism, noting that by September 2009, Posner had become a confirmed Keynesian: "As acts of betrayal go, this was roughly akin to Johnny Damon's shaving off his beard, forsaking the Red Sox Nation, and joining the Yankees."

== See also ==
- Criticism of capitalism
- American Dream Down Payment Act of 2003
