= Indiana Harbor Belt Railroad =

Class III railroad in the Midwest

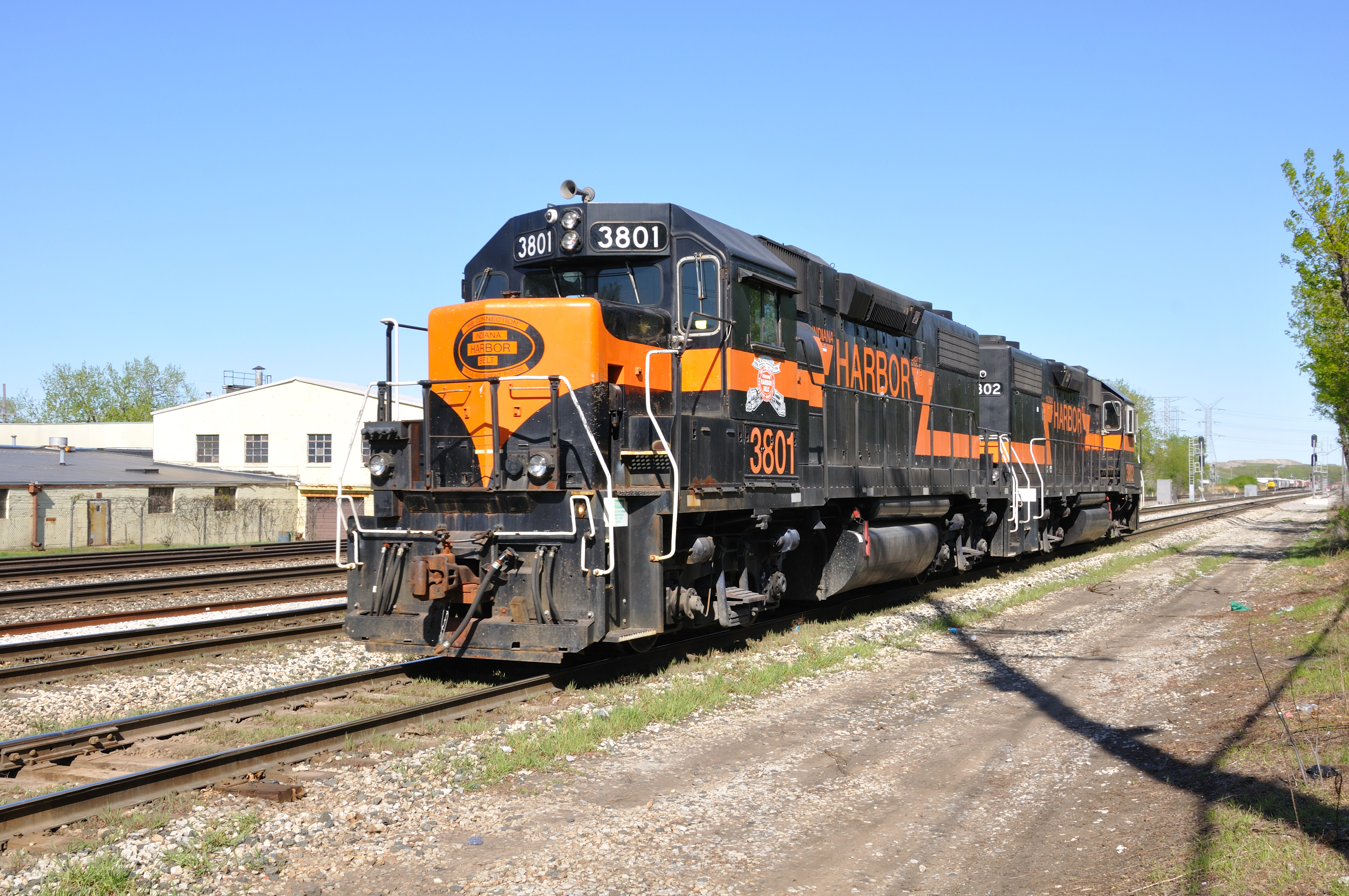
- IHB number 3801 and 3802, both EMD GP38-2s

Overview
- Headquarters: Hammond, Indiana
- Reporting mark: IHB
- Locale: Northwest Indiana, suburbs of Chicago, Illinois
- Dates of operation: 1896–present

Technical
- Track gauge: 4 ft 8 1/2 in (1,435 mm) standard gauge

Other
- Website: www.ihbrr.com

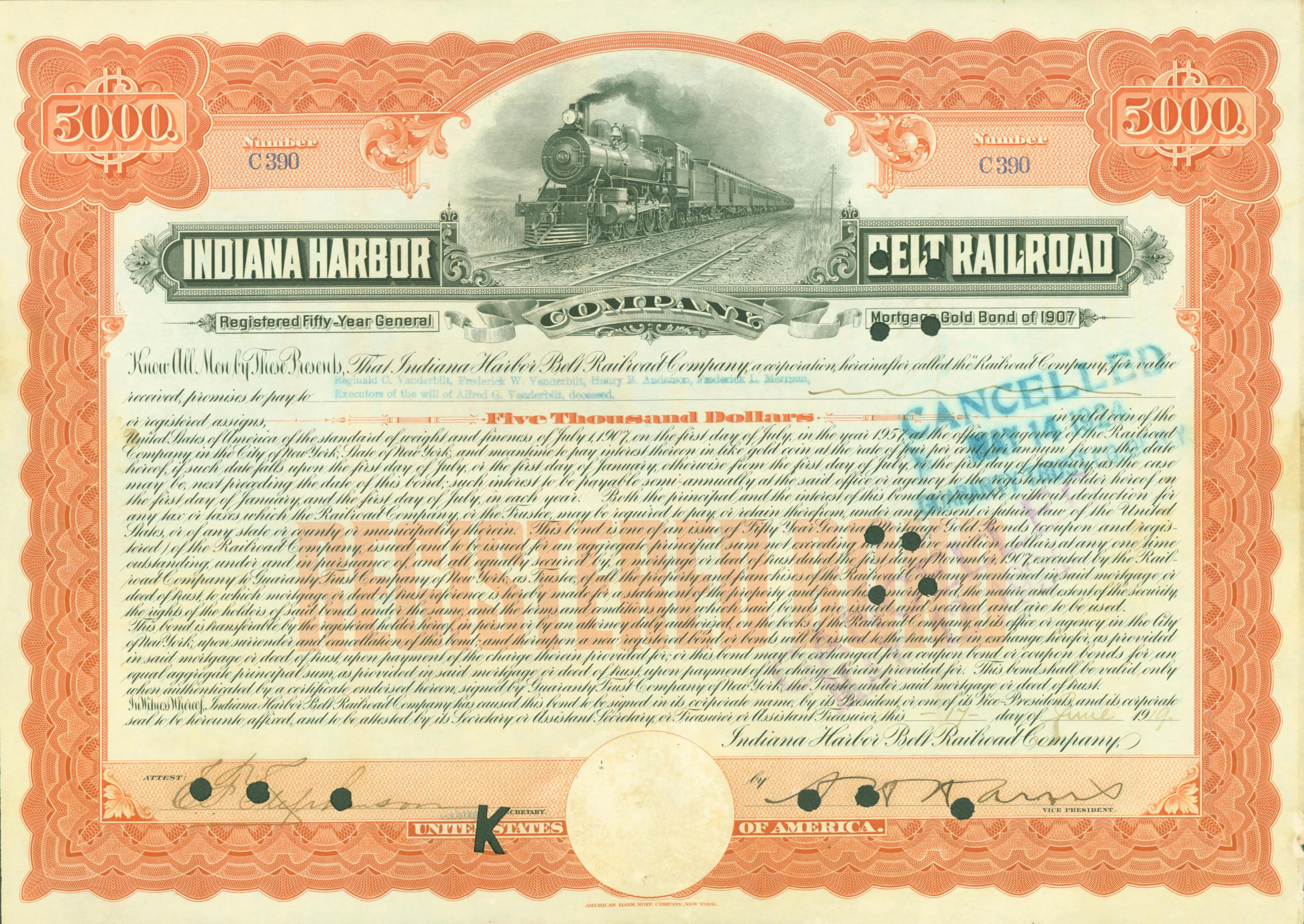
Registered Bond of the Indiana Harbor Belt Railroad, issued 17. June 1919.

The Indiana Harbor Belt Railroad (reporting mark IHB) is a Class III railroad in the United States.

== Ownership ==
The IHB is jointly owned by Conrail Shared Assets Operations (51%) and Canadian Pacific Kansas City Limited (49%). These shareholders trace their ownership stake in IHB to previous mergers and acquisitions in the railroad industry. Conrail's ownership is traced back to the Penn Central Transportation Company and prior to that, the New York Central Railroad and Pennsylvania Railroad. CPKC's ownership is through its subsidiary, the Soo Line, which inherited it from the Chicago, Milwaukee, St. Paul and Pacific Railroad (also known as the "Milwaukee Road"). Also, the IHB's northern terminus is the Milwaukee District West Line in Franklin Park, Illinois, which is operated by Metra and CPKC.

== Route and facilities ==
The line comprises 320 miles (510 km) of track—30 miles (48 km) of single mainline track, 24 miles (39 km) of double-main track and 266 miles (428 km) of additional yard and side track—starting northwest of Chicago in Franklin Park, Illinois at CPKC's Elgin Subdivision, traveling southeast around the city to its headquarters in Hammond, Indiana.

The railroad's largest yard is Blue Island located in Riverdale, Illinois. The Gibson Yard, located in Hammond, Indiana, is arguably the largest automobile traffic switching operation in the United States. Other yards include Burnham, Calumet City, Alsip, Argo, LaGrange, Rose, Norpaul, Whiting, Michigan Avenue, and Lakefront.

Since the 1970s, the IHB has operated an extensive interlocking tower system including: East End, Osbourne, Calumet, State Line, Gibson, Stewart Avenue, Graselli, 55th Street and Argo towers. Switch tenders are located at North Harvey and Columbia Avenue. IHB also took over State Line tower from the Chicago and Western Indiana Railroad.

== See also ==
- Indiana Harbor Belt Railroad Co. v. American Cyanamid Co., a landmark torts case which involved the railroad.

Preceded by Reading Blue Mountain and Northern Railroad	Regional Railroad of the Year; 2003	Succeeded by Wheeling and Lake Erie Railway
