= Prime Time Access Rule =

American broadcasting regulation

The Prime Time Access Rule (PTAR) was an American television broadcasting regulation enforced by the Federal Communications Commission (FCC) from September 13, 1971, to August 30, 1996. It was instituted under concerns that television networks controlled too much of their affiliates' programming, and that there was not enough competition in program production and distribution. Under the regulation, commercial television networks were prohibited from airing programming in the 7:30 p.m. ET/PT half-hour on weekdays and Saturdays, and the 7:00 p.m. and 10:30 p.m. ET/PT half-hours on Sundays, on stations in the top 50 media markets. Despite only applying in the largest markets, the PTAR was practiced nationwide.

In the prime access timeslots, stations were expected to schedule local programming; the FCC prohibited reruns of networked programming from airing in the prime access timeslots. In practice, the early-evening fringe became a lucrative time slot for first-run syndicated programming, including game shows, entertainment series, and variety shows. A second regulation—the Financial Interest and Syndication Rules (fin-syn)—was introduced alongside the PTAR, which prohibited the major networks from owning their prime time programs or having co-owned syndication divisions. The PTAR was partially loosened in 1975, allowing the networks to re-claim an hour of programming they had lost on Sunday evenings, provided that the 7:00 p.m. hour be used to schedule either news-based or family-oriented programming. In 1996, the PTAR was repealed by the FCC, which deemed it to be no longer necessary.

The regulations had a major impact on the television industry, with some of its effects still felt today: the PTAR moved the traditional start of prime time programming on the Big Three networks on weekdays and Saturdays from 7:30 p.m. to 8:00 p.m.—a scheduling pattern that has remained to this day, and was adopted by later entrants such as Fox, The WB and UPN, and their joint successor The CW. The PTAR was a factor in the mass cancellation of various programs popular among older and rural audiences, as the networks sought to target younger audiences more desirable to advertisers. Some of these cancelled shows—such as Hee Haw, Lassie, and The Lawrence Welk Show—resurfaced in first-run syndication, and were often picked up in the slots created by the PTAR. By the mid-1980s, many stations began to also air syndicated programming in the 7:00 p.m. slot to form a full "prime access hour".

Even with the repeal of the PTAR, the Big Three networks did not reclaim the 7:00 p.m. hour on weekdays in part because the repeal of fin-syn allowed the networks to purchase the syndicators who were filling the airtime, meaning they would profit either way; they have largely maintained a status quo in the time periods to avoid confusing (and losing) viewers by changing the schedules of established syndicated hits.

== Issuance ==
After lobbying by Donald McGannon of Group W Broadcasting (and thus known as the McGannon Rule), The Federal Communications Commission (FCC) issued the Prime Time Access Rule (PTAR) in 1970 and was implemented at the beginning of the 1971–1972 television season (the week of September 13–19, 1971). It was re-examined periodically, and it underwent several modifications since its initial implementation.

The PTAR was instituted over a stated concern, by television-reform activists and other parties, that the three major television networks (ABC, CBS, and NBC) dominated the television program production market, controlled much of the programming presented to the public, and inhibited the development of competing program sources, especially independent syndicators and local stations. The FCC believed that PTAR would ultimately increase the level of competition in program production, reduce the networks' control over programming decisions made by their affiliates, and thereby increase the diversity of programs available to the public, especially in the evening hours when most households were watching.

To ensure that independent companies would have access, the Financial Interest and Syndication Rules (commonly known as "fin-syn") were instituted at the same time by the FCC. This prohibited networks from owning syndication arms. Networks that did operate existing syndication divisions were forced to divest them, converting them into new companies independent from network management (such as Viacom, which was originally created by CBS to distribute its content and eventually expanded outside of program syndication and distribution in the succeeding years after the spinoff).

== Implementation ==
Initially, the rule required the commercial networks to cede one half-hour of their nightly programming to their affiliates (or owned-and-operated stations) in the 50 largest markets, Mondays through Saturdays, from 7:30 to 8 p.m. Eastern (6:30 to 7 Central), and a full hour on Sundays, between 7 and 7:30 p.m. (6 to 6:30 Central) and 10:30 to 11 p.m. (9:30 to 10 Central). Because it would have represented a large if not prohibitive loss of advertising exposure for the networks to have their programs excluded from the largest stations (and thus not reaching half or more of the U.S. population), the networks opted to relinquish those timeslots to all their stations, not just those required by the text of PTAR.

Regardless of the night of the week, the National Association of Broadcasters instituted a decree that the early evening programs not portray violent, sexual, or profane content unsuitable for younger audiences. This was made in conjunction with the family viewing hour networks were encouraged to program in the hour following access; this decree was ruled to have been made under illegal duress in fall 1976. Exceptions to the PTAR applied for live sports telecasts that overran into the access slots, and "special news, documentary and children's programming, and certain sports and network programming of a special nature".

With fewer time slots available, networks issued a higher-than-normal number of cancellations in the summer of 1971. The networks, CBS in particular, disproportionately removed shows that were popular among rural and older audiences as part of their cancellations—a phenomenon known as the "rural purge"—in an attempt to revamp their lineups. The networks aimed to appeal more to younger, urban and suburban viewers with more disposable income and less product brand loyalty than older, non-metropolitan Americans—two things advertisers of the time strongly desired.

The FCC and supporters of the ruling had hoped, at least publicly, that stations would make every effort to air programs of either a public-affairs or educational orientation, particularly in the 7:30 p.m. time slot on weekdays and Saturdays. In practice, the weekday and Saturday access slot was often used for first-run syndicated game shows; they were often "nighttime" versions of network daytime game shows, usually with different hosts and higher prize budgets to differentiate them from the network versions (such as The Price Is Right with Dennis James; CBS had passed on James in favor of Bob Barker to host the daytime version), as well as revivals of former network shows such as To Tell the Truth (Garry Moore) and Truth or Consequences (Bob Barker). Many of the game shows were distributed by companies that before 1971 had been subsidiaries owned by the networks (such as the former CBS property Viacom and former ABC property Worldvision Enterprises) and packaged by the same production companies at the same studios as their daytime counterparts. Depending on the frequency of their production, those shows were aired either on a weekly basis, (allowing a different program to air each night, not unlike the networks' own schedule), or as a daily "strip".

After their cancellations in the "rural purge", series such as Lassie, Hee Haw, and The Lawrence Welk Show successfully migrated to first-run syndication. All three shows often aired in fringe timeslots created by the PTAR, with Hee Haw, Welk, and the newly established Soul Train (which focused on R&B, soul, and hip hop music targeting an African American audience) usually airing on Saturday nights. Some stations used the timeslot to present a locally produced newsmagazine; KSL-TV in Salt Lake City aired such a program—fittingly titled Prime Time Access (PTA)—until 1988.

Television critics almost uniformly denounced PTAR, holding that its stated aim to improve and diversify programming had backfired (i.e., the substituted programming basically circumvented the purpose of the ruling since most of the shows were not particularly original) due to economic realities, things they and others felt the FCC had not taken into consideration when enacting the regulation. Needless to say, the networks were not pleased with the results, either, believing the true motivation behind PTAR was nothing more than a plot by the Nixon Administration and its sympathizers in the FCC (and the U.S. Congress) to deprive them of ad revenues, as a political retaliation against their news divisions' generally adverse coverage of the White House's policies on the Vietnam War and against the social turbulence of the time.

Also, ABC, CBS, and NBC were especially sensitive to declining ad sales due to the Federal Government's prohibition of broadcast cigarette advertising (with loopholes permitting other tobacco products to continue commercials until the 1980s) in January 1971, once a lucrative source of revenue, and the beginning of the recessions that would plague the next dozen years after that. NBC's 1973 effort to compensate by extending the broadcast day another hour into the overnight with The Midnight Special and Tomorrow with Tom Snyder was a modest success (enough to continue programming the time slots indefinitely afterward) but not enough to recover the lost revenue. As such, the networks resolved to agitate for either outright repeal of PTAR or to get back one or more nights per week of the time lost in 1971. The window of opportunity for that opened when Richard Nixon left office in 1974 due to the Watergate scandal. During that time, Nixon's animosity toward the American media was discredited due to revelations of his and his associates' abuse of power which, in turn, vindicated to many Americans (though not all) the critical stance the networks appeared to take toward him over the years. With a more media-friendly president, Gerald Ford, in office, and probably new appointees on the FCC, the networks thus gained leverage to attempt to restore their lost air time. In Ford's first year in office, it happened through a compromise.

== Sunday night revision ==
While the networks hoped to have PTAR done away with entirely, their affiliates opposed such a move due to profitable local spot ad revenues on Mondays through Saturdays, so they settled for a revision by the FCC instead in 1975. That modification allowed networks to reclaim the hour on Sunday nights lost in 1971, from 7 to 11 p.m. (6 to 10 Central). Then as now, the night of the week with the largest potential audience was Sunday, due to competing forms of entertainment (e.g., movie theaters, nightclubs) being mostly closed on that night in much of the country because of long-standing religious-inspired blue laws, and the networks, if forced to choose only one day of the week for restoration, would certainly choose it. The Sunday return of network time came with one overweening condition: programs between 7 and 8 (6 to 7 Central) or, if necessary, beyond 8/7 Central if the show continued, had to either have news/informational content or appeal primarily to a family audience with children, meaning that adult subject matter (especially sexuality and violence) was not permitted during that time period.

Beginning on September 14, 1975, CBS debuted a family drama, Three for the Road, at 7 p.m. That show ran only 12 episodes before being canceled. 60 Minutes, a news magazine that CBS had run in irregular timeslots since its inception in 1968, was designated as the replacement, beginning on December 7. By the end of the season in early 1976, it had become the top-rated program on Sunday nights, a highly unusual occurrence at the time for a news-based broadcast. Its main competition in the early years was NBC's long-running The Wonderful World of Disney, which appealed to family viewers, having moved ahead a half-hour from 7:30 p.m., where it had aired from 1971 to 1975. By 1981, the ratings lead of 60 Minutes was so strong that NBC canceled Disney after a 20-year run there, with CBS picking it up for a Saturday-night slot that fall. ABC, and NBC after 1981, attempted numerous shows that made little or no impact upon the 60 Minutes stronghold on viewers in the late 1970s and 1980s.

The 1990s brought some stability to the networks other than CBS. Because of realignment, CBS was relegated into minor-network status, and lost its lead-in to 60 Minutes. ABC has programmed America's Funniest Home Videos in the slot for much of the time since 1993 (except for a period from 1997 to 2002, when ABC broadcast The Wonderful World of Disney in the 7:00 p.m. hour, where NBC had carried it in the late 1970s), while CBS has shown 60 Minutes in the slot consistently since 1975 except on very rare occasions, usually years when CBS has the rights to the Super Bowl or the AFC Championship Game, which kicks off at approximately 6:30 p.m. (5:30 Central); prior to 1978, the contest aired on a Sunday afternoon in January. NBC has mostly broadcast Dateline NBC in the slot since 1996, though since regaining NFL broadcasting rights in 2006, during football season the network airs Football Night in America in the slot as a pre-game show to its NBC Sunday Night Football broadcasts, Basketball Night in America (starting in January 2026) before its NBC Sunday Night Basketball NBA games, and NBC Sunday Night Baseball MLB games (starting in April 2026). During most of the winter and spring, NBC (as well as ABC and Fox) has aired programming in this time slot that is not a news or information program (such as the aforementioned Dateline NBC). Such programs are usually either reruns of shows that have aired in weekday Primetime which are re-edited to conform to the standards of the time slot, or theatrical films intended for family viewing (such as animated films).

Even today, some networks still air aural and/or visual bumpers (i.e. "We'll return after these messages") in the 7/6 p.m. timeslot for younger viewers to understand the difference between a program and a commercial (as if the show aired on Saturday mornings)—such bumpers, one of the original requirements of the timeslot, are not required for news and information programs such as the aforementioned 60 Minutes and Dateline NBC, since those shows are mainly watched by an adult audience.

The slot has been used by the networks to broadcast run-over programming from NFL games, since the NFL broadcasting contracts require its games to air in their entirety (this happened as a result of the infamous "Heidi Game" in November 1968, in which NBC cut away from an Oakland Raiders-New York Jets game to air the television film Heidi, prior to a Raiders' comeback late in the fourth quarter). While CBS shifts its Sunday evening schedule to start after its NFL coverage concludes, Fox has utilized a different approach: the network completely preempted its lineup until the last game it held the right to broadcast in each region had finished until 2004, after which it joined its primetime lineup in progress (preempting portions or even the entirety of programs scheduled to air between 7 and 8 p.m. following the game's designated time slot). Similarly, if necessary, major tournaments in professional golf are also treated in this manner; since 1987 (the year Daylight Saving Time was moved to an earlier start), the Masters Tournament has frequently not finished until that hour. The U.S. Open and Men's PGA Championship, depending on the region, also can be overrun into the timeslot, with Pacific Time Zone tournaments allowing networks to run into well past 8 p.m.

Since 2005, Fox has aired the post-game show, The OT, in the slot as filler programming between its NFL coverage and The Simpsons at 8 p.m., with its length depending on how late the final game ends, since NFL games with a 4:25 p.m. (Eastern) start time almost always end by 8 p.m., even if the game goes into overtime. Fox has continued the practice for NASCAR Cup Series races, where most of their races on the schedule start after 3 p.m. ET in order to ensure the finish of the race will finish just before or enter into the 7 p.m. hour (such as their West Coast races, the Hampton, GA 2024 round that ended with a dramatic finish, in order to lead into their primetime programming. Before that, the 7 p.m. hour on Fox was used similarly to that of the Friday night death slot on all of the networks, as several shows near the end of their runs (such as Malcolm in the Middle, Family Guy and Futurama) were assigned to air in the time period but ultimately got preempted by Fox's NFL coverage. This tradition has continued during the off-season, with the most recent examples of shows burned off on Sundays at the 7 p.m. half-hour being 'Til Death and Sons of Tucson during the spring and summer of 2010, and Mulaney in 2014. Often, reruns of programming from earlier in the week are used as expendible programming in case an NFL or NASCAR event creeps past the 7 p.m. ET hour.

On October 7, 2018, The CW resumed programming a primetime lineup on Sunday nights. Unlike its previous effort to program that night from the network's launch in September 2006 (a byproduct of originally adopting co-predecessor The WB's 30-hour weekly base schedule upon The CW's launch) until it ceded the timeslot to its affiliates in September 2009, The CW opted to only to offer programming during the "common prime" slot (8 to 10 pm. ET/PT) offered on weekdays and Saturdays by the conventional broadcast networks that have launched on U.S. television since Fox's expansion to include prime time program offerings in April 1987. This move marked the first such instance of a major U.S. television network not programming that hour since the 1975 PTAR revision was implemented.

== Weekdays, 1980s ==
By the early 1980s, the weeknight PTAR slots had changed from a predominance of weekly game shows and feature programming and sitcom reruns (many in the latter category moving to independent stations), to nightly versions of games such as Family Feud and Tic Tac Dough and magazine-format programs such as the Group W-founded PM Magazine, and Entertainment Tonight. This transition bolstered viewer interest and station revenues, meaning that the networks were extremely reluctant to upset affiliate relations by attempting to scale back PTAR further.

A syndicated version of Merv Griffin's NBC daytime game show Wheel of Fortune—distributed by King World Entertainment—premiered in 1983; initially airing in a handful of smaller markets, its nationwide clearance (especially in the access hour) rapidly increased over the course of its first two seasons. By 1986, Wheel had become the highest-rated syndicated program on American television. In 1984, King World launched an Alex Trebek-hosted revival of Griffin's former NBC quiz show Jeopardy!, with a number of stations pairing it in the access hour with Wheel to build upon its ratings strength.

In New York City, Jeopardy! initially aired in a late-night time slot on New York City's WNBC. After ABC's soap opera The Edge of Night was cancelled in December 1984, a deal was reached to move Jeopardy! to the soap's former 4 p.m. time slot on WABC-TV. On December 15, 1986, WABC moved The Oprah Winfrey Show (also distributed by King World) from 10 a.m. to 4 p.m. to provide a stronger lead-in for its 5 p.m. newscast. Jeopardy! would move to 7:00 p.m. as a lead-in for The New Hollywood Squares (which had held its own against Wheel on WCBS in the ratings), ABC World News Tonight was moved from 7:00 p.m. to 6:30 p.m., and WABC cut its 6 p.m. newscast to a half hour. The new scheduling proved successful for WABC, and prompted other stations (including WCBS and WNBC) to adopt a similar pattern—eventually making it commonplace. The ABC owned-and-operated stations later acquired the rights to both Wheel and Jeopardy!, where they have aired ever since.

== 1996 elimination ==
The PTAR was eliminated on August 30, 1996, the commission having determined it was "no longer necessary" as a tool to promote independent production or affiliate autonomy. The major networks did not reclaim the traditional access period in early primetime due to pressure from affiliates to retain control of one of the more profitable parts of their programming schedules. Several of the longest-running first-run syndicated programs—such as Entertainment Tonight, Wheel of Fortune, and Jeopardy!—are still often broadcast in the "prime access hour", and have earned audiences equal to or greater than many network shows. Though the syndicators who distribute those shows are now also owned by the same networks (all three of the mentioned programs are distributed by the syndication arm of CBS), the syndicators have historically been resistant to bring the shows in-network, since part of the shows' successes are tied to continuity being on the same channels for decades, even before the networks owned their own syndication deals; a long-standing agreement by King World before CBS acquired it in 2000 has carried over a carriage agreement for Wheel and Jeopardy! to air on the owned-and-operated stations of its rival ABC for that reason.

In 2010, Fox began presenting World Series games that started around 7:30 p.m. Eastern Time, presumably under the hope that games would not run into the 11:00 p.m. (Eastern) hour (though in practice, this still consistently occurred despite the early start until the pitch clock was introduced in 2023). In 2012, Fox did the same with the Daytona 500 that was delayed 30 hours by weather, with a 7:00 p.m. Eastern Time start, although that race ended after midnight Eastern Time Tuesday because of a 2 hour, 27 minute delay caused by severe cleanup caused by a jet dryer explosion on Lap 160. In 2020 (when the suspended race resumed on Lap 21) and 2024, Fox started the rescheduled races at 4:00 p.m. Eastern Time. The 2020 race ended into the Prime Time Access Rule hour, and the 2024 race ended in primetime hours because of cleanup related to a red flag caused by a Lap 192 crash. In 2014 and 2015, CBS moved its Thursday primetime to start at 7:30 p.m. for the first eight weeks of the season to allow for a full pregame show for Thursday Night Football, a move which was emulated for NBC and Fox's carriage of the same package.

Smaller networks such as Pax TV launched with full 24-hour schedules after the rule change. Some networks, though, had programmed the access hour even while the rule was still in effect, particularly Spanish-language networks that hold responsibility for the majority of their affiliates' programming schedules, such as Univision and Telemundo.

== See also ==
- Schurz Communications, Inc. v. FCC
- Telecommunications Act of 1996, issued at the same time as PTAR was repealed
