= Catastrophe: Risk and Response =

2004 book by Richard Posner

- Cover of the first edition
- Author: Richard Posner
- Language: English
- Publisher: Oxford University Press
- Publication date: 2004
- Publication place: United States
- Media type: Print (Hardcover and Paperback)
- Pages: 336
- ISBN: 978-0195306477

Catastrophe: Risk and Response is a 2004 book by the American legal scholar and economist Richard Posner, in which the author advocates the use of a cost–benefit framework to address potential major disasters such as runaway global warming and planet-obliterating asteroids.

== See also ==
- Global catastrophic risks
