= Economic law =

Economic law is a set of legal rules for regulating economic activity. Economics can be defined as "a social science concerned with the production, distribution, and consumption of goods and services." The regulation of such phenomena, law, can be defined as "customs, practices, and rules of conduct of a community that are recognized as binding by the community", where "enforcement of the body of rules is through a controlling authority." Accordingly, different states have their own legal infrastructure and produce different provisions of goods and services.

== Economic systems ==
The objective of economic law is to address the logistics of production and distribution. Within each political and economic system, there are different and particular legal infrastructures to regulate production and distribution. These economic systems entail different philosophical and logical underpinnings when it comes to implementing the laws that govern the production of goods and services, distribution of wealth, the responsibilities of different stakeholders/key actors in the economy as well as the ownership of wealth and resources. Examples of political and economic systems include the market system (capitalism), the command system (socialism) and traditional systems.

=== Capitalism – the market economic system ===
There are varying forms and varying definitions/types of capitalism. Depending on the type of capitalism, the economic laws that govern that particular system have different levels of restrictions for the state, market and property owners. Characteristics of capitalism include the private ownership of property and the intention of production being the sales of the produced goods and services into the market. With regards to the role of the government, the primary responsibility of the state is to ensure there is an effective infrastructure for businesses to conduct in a free market society, where private ownership is key. What constitutes an effective infrastructure (which economic law is a segment of) differs between states. The different forms of capitalism stem from the different institutional arrangements particular capitalist countries have and the extent to which property is private and the level of involvement from the government in regulating commercial activity.

Based on the involvement of the government and the state's perception of the role of its government, capitalist systems can be further differentiated into Varieties of Capitalism. The two forms of capitalist economic systems include liberal market economies (LMEs) and coordinated market economies (CMEs). LMEs entail a system of economic laws that leans towards the notion of a free market. This involves laws regulating economic activity favouring minimal government intervention of a business's competitive landscape. Such characteristics mean that laws governing a LME consist of deregulated policies that prioritise privatisation, antitrust laws that prevent monopolies, collusions and encourage competition as well as tax incentives that encourage businesses to re-invest and generate more profits. CMEs place less emphasis on the market and competition as laws that tend to govern their economic outcomes prioritise the collaboration between various stakeholders. This is evident in the existence of "deliberative institutions'' that serve to promote information sharing amongst firms.

=== Socialism – the command system ===
Socialism is a philosophy that asserts political and economic systems should entail public ownership of the means of production. The underpinnings of socialism opposes private ownership and champions collective/social ownership. This often entails state ownership (a form of public ownership), with the rationale being that states act in the interest of the public and distribute resources in an equitable nature. Laws that govern a socialist economies are collectivist in nature and seek to produce egalitarian outcomes. Capitalist societies allocate profits made from production to an entity's shareholders whilst in socialist economics, the purpose of production is to meet consumer needs, where profits are considered social dividends.

== Business ==
Competition laws, also known as antitrust laws, regulate the amount of dominance a company is able to have over an industry and does so via regulating business practices. Practices that are regulated include mergers and acquisitions and deceptive business practices that lead to monopolising an industry and creating unfair entry barriers, where they are the sole provider with that industry.

There are two forms of market structures with corresponding forms of competition that governments are able to promote via policies and the commercial activities it restricts. One form of competition is the existence of a mass amount of small-sized businesses and the other being a limited amount of market dominating businesses. Monopolistic competition entails the existence of many firms competing within the same industry. Industries/Countries that promote monopolistic competition adopt stricter antitrust policies. These policies enable the production of goods and services that are differentiated and provide consumers with various options. Monopolistic market structures do not have significant bargaining power in pricing its products and influencing the supply or demand of its products. Oligopolies entail a small number of large firms within an industry. Antitrust laws governing oligopolies are less restricting of business activities, where a small number of large firms have significant market power and entry into oligopolistic markets are difficult. These firms collude and create rather than respond to market demand through fixing prices and dedicating funds to lobbying for favourable policies.

== International economic law ==
International economic law is an aspect of international law that concerns the economic relations between states and how transactions that occur cross-border are governed. The primary actors in the regulation of International economic laws are “States, international organisations, and private actors”. Areas of International economic law include agreements on commercial and transactional activities cross-border laws governing international trade, international investment and monetary law and intellectual property rights. These areas are governed by international economic institutions, which include the World Trade Organisation (WTO), the International Monetary Fund (IMF), the United Nations, the Organisation for Economic Cooperation and Development and the World Bank. There are also international organisations that govern international economic laws on a smaller scale (regionally). Some of these include the Association of Southeast Asian Nations (ASEAN), the Asia-Pacific Economic Cooperation and the European Union.

=== International economic organisations ===
International economic organisations are institutions that provides multiple states that have their own particular system of economic laws and governance a common architecture to conduct transnational economic activity.

==== World Trade Organization ====
Members of the World Trade Organization (in green)

The World Trade Organization (WTO) is an intergovernmental organisation that provides the infrastructure for international trade. The WTO provides the rules on the trading of goods, services and intellectual property between states. These rule are determined through countries that trade negotiating the terms and conditions for doing so. The purpose of the WTO and the economic laws it imposes are to promote liberalised trade, reduce the barriers of cross-border trading and enable a cooperative trading system that is mutually beneficial for all states involved. The WTO enabled the Agreement on Trade-Related Aspects of Intellectual Property - also known as "TRIPS Agreement". Members of the WTO negotiated the terms of regulating intellectual property in the global economic systems.

==== International Monetary Fund ====
The International Monetary Fund is governed by its 190 countries who possess a membership in the IMF. The IMF provides rules for international monetary cooperation and enabling the international monetary system is secure and balanced. Its primary activities include promoting stable exchange rates, international trade, "financing the short-term balance-of-payments deficits of member countries" and consulting to countries borrowing funds. Countries that borrow money from the IMF receive financial support under the condition that they implement a set of policy reforms. The IMF regulates lending policies according to the patterns of globalisation, where regulations tend to reflect the interests of the state(s) with the largest shareholdings in the IMF.

== See also ==
- A Failure of Capitalism
- Constitutional economics
- Law and economics
- Law office management
- Political economy
