= Seth Baum =

American researcher

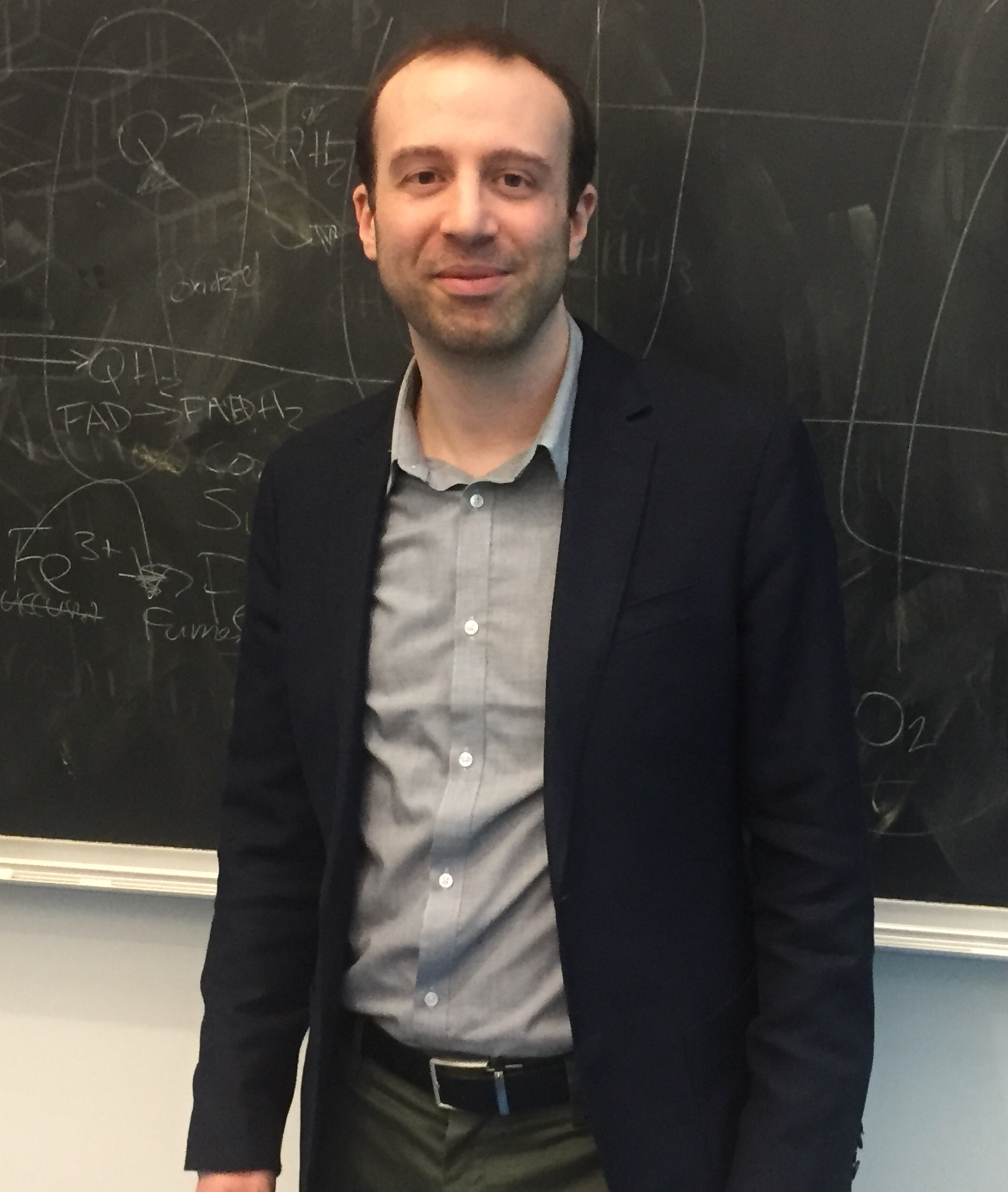
- Born: October 17, 1980 (age 46)
- Education: Ph.D in Geography
- Alma mater: Pennsylvania State University
- Occupation: Researcher
- Years active: 2001–present
- Known for: Global Catastrophic Risk Institute; Existential risks research

Seth Baum is an American researcher involved in the field of risk research. He is the executive director of the Global Catastrophic Risk Institute (GCRI), a think tank focused on existential risk. He is also affiliated with the Blue Marble Space Institute of Science and the Columbia University Center for Research on Environmental Decisions.

== Academic career ==
Baum obtained his BS in optics and mathematics in 2003 at the University of Rochester, followed by an MS in Electrical Engineering, Northeastern University in 2006.

In 2012, he obtained his PhD in Geography with his dissertation on climate change policy: "Discounting Across Space and Time in Climate Change Assessment" from Pennsylvania State University. Later, he completed a post-doctoral fellowship with the Columbia University Center for Research on Environmental Decisions. Baum then steered his research interests into astrophysics and global risks, including global warming and nuclear war, and the development of effective solutions for reducing them.

Furthermore, he is a Fellow of the Society for Risk Analysis.

== Work ==
As a graduate student in Northstrom, Boston, Baum contributed to the Whats Up magazine (now Spare Change News), from 2004 to 2007.

In 2011, Baum co-founded GCRI along with Tony Barrett, with the mission to "develop the best ways to confront humanity's gravest threats". The institute has since grown rapidly, publishing in peer-reviewed academic journals and media outlets. As of 2016, its main work is on the "Integrated Assessment Project", which assesses all the global catastrophic risks in order to make them available for societal learning and decision making processes. GCRI is funded by "a mix of grants, private donations, and occasional consulting work.

Two years later, Baum hosted a regular blog on Scientific American and has been interviewed about his work and research in the History Channel and the O'Reilly Factor., where he was asked about studying possible human contact with extraterrestrial life and the ethics involved. He also started contributing regularly to The Huffington Post, writing about the Russo-Ukrainian War and the Syrian Civil War as possible scenarios for nuclear war.

In 2016, after receiving a 100,000 dollar grant from the Future of Life Institute his research interests shifted to AI safety and the ethics of outer space. That same year, he wrote a monthly column for the Bulletin of the Atomic Scientists, where he discussed AI threats, biological weapons and the risks of nuclear deterrence failure.

== See also ==
- Global catastrophic risk
