= Global Challenges Foundation =

Swedish non-profit organization

- Formation: 2012
- Founder: László Szombatfalvy
- Purpose: Global catastrophic risks
- Headquarters: Stockholm, Sweden
- Website: globalchallenges.org

The Global Challenges Foundation is a Swedish non-profit organization that seeks to raise awareness of global catastrophic risk and the global governance necessary to handle these risks. This includes examining models for UN reform, as well as initiating new ideas for a functioning global governance. It was founded in 2012 with a donation by the Swedish- Hungarian billionaire László Szombatfalvy.

== Foundation ==
The foundation is based in Stockholm. Its board members include Johan Rockström, and the fourth AP Fund's former CEO Mats Andersson. The foundation's assets predominantly consist of a donation from László Szombatfalvy, which represented roughly half of his fortune at the time—around 500 million Swedish kronor.

== Risk awareness ==
Global Challenges Foundation is working to raise awareness of global catastrophic risks, currently primarily climate change, other environmental degradation, and political violence focusing on weapons of mass destruction. In order to do this at both the public and the decision-making levels, the Global Challenges Foundation is closely cooperating with a number of institutions, including the Future of Humanity Institute at Oxford University.

Another risk-related project driven by the Global Challenges Foundation, along with Earth League, is Earth Statement. The climate call aims at reducing the gap between science and politics, and has formulated eight points on which the world's decision-makers need to agree to achieve a successful climate agreement at COP21. Earth Statement has been signed by Al Gore, Desmond Tutu, Mo Ibrahim, Richard Branson, Arianna Huffington, Gro Harlem Brundtland, Yuan T. Lee and Mary Robinson.

Global Challenges Foundation gave support to the Stockholm School of Economics for a new track – Global Challenges. The course is included in the Bachelor program in Business and Economics.

The Global Challenges Foundation conducts international risk surveys and publishes annual reports on global risks, interspersed with quarterly reports that look at various aspects of global catastrophic risk and global governance. For example, the 2016 annual report estimates that an average American is more than five times likely to die during a human extinction event than in a car crash. The 2017 report highlighted a broad range of security related topics, among them climate change, and concluded that global warming has a high likelihood to end civilization.

== The New Shape Prize ==
In November 2016, the Global Challenges Foundation launched the Global Challenges Prize – A New Shape, an international competition that calls on people of academia, politics, business and civil society worldwide for proposals that outline new models of global governance. It offered $5 Million in prizes with the best entry receiving at least $1 million. The foundation would then back efforts to bring the winning ideas towards implementation. The award ceremony took place at the end of May 2018 in Stockholm.
