= Indiana Harbor Belt Railroad Co. v. American Cyanamid Co. =

- Court: United States Court of Appeals for the Seventh Circuit
- Full case name: Indiana Harbor Belt Railroad Company v. American Cyanamid Company
- Decided: October 18 1990
- Citation: 916 F.2d 1174, 32 ERC 1228; 59 USLW 2295

Holding
- A shipper of a hazardous chemical by rail is not strictly liable for the consequences of a spill or other accident to the shipment en route. A shipper may, however, be held liable if a plaintiff can prove that the shipper acted negligently.

Court membership
- Judges sitting: Richard Posner, Daniel Anthony Manion and Michael Stephen Kanne

Case opinions
- Majority: Posner, joined by Manion, Kanne

Laws applied
- Illinois State Law; Restatement (Second) of Torts § 520

Indiana Harbor Belt Railroad Co. v. American Cyanamid Co., 916 F.2d 1174 (7th Cir. 1990), is a decision of the United States Court of Appeals for the Seventh Circuit authored by Judge Richard Posner. The case has subsequently become a staple of first year Torts courses taught in American law schools, where the case is used to address the question of when it is better to use negligence liability or strict liability.

== Background ==
American Cyanamid was a manufacturer that produced chemicals, including acrylonitrile, which is used in making acrylic fibers, plastics, dyes, pharmaceutical chemicals, and other products. In January 1979, American Cyanamid wanted to ship acrylonitrile from its plant in Louisiana to its plant in New Jersey. It therefore leased a tank car from the North American Car Corporation, filled it with 20,000 gallons of liquid acrylonitrile, and the Missouri Pacific Railroad then picked up the car from the Louisiana plant. Missouri Pacific Railroad delivered the car to the Indiana Harbor Belt Railroad, a Chicago-area switching railroad, who were to switch the car to Conrail for final delivery to the New Jersey plant.

However, several hours after the car arrived at the Blue Island Rail Yard in Riverdale, Illinois (on Riverdale's border with Blue Island, Illinois), Indiana Harbor Belt Railroad employees noticed that acrylonitrile was gushing out of the car because the lid on the outlet was broken. Concerned because acrylonitrile is flammable, highly toxic, and possibly a carcinogen, local officials ordered an evacuation until the leak could be stopped and the car moved to a remote part of the rail yard.

Worried that the leak may have resulted in soil contamination and water contamination, the Illinois Environmental Protection Agency subsequently ordered Indiana Harbor Belt Railroad to clean up the site. Indiana Harbor Belt Railroad ultimately spent approximately $980,000 on cleaning up the rail yard.

Indiana Harbor Belt Railroad brought suit against American Cyanamid seeking to recover the cleanup costs from American Cyanamid. The suit set forth two legal theories: (1) that American Cyanamid had negligently maintained the leased car; and (2) that, since American Cyanamid was involved in an abnormally dangerous activity, it was strictly liable for the consequences of a spill or other accident to the shipment en route.

American Cyanamid moved to dismiss Indiana Harbor Belt Railroad's strict liability claim against it, but the district judge denied this motion. Indiana Harbor Belt Railroad therefore moved for summary judgment and won. The district judge then dismissed Indiana Harbor Belt Railroad's negligence claim so that American Cyanamid could appeal the strict liability decision to the Seventh Circuit.

== Opinion ==
Circuit Judge Posner begins by stating that this case presents a case of first impression so there is no precedent directly governing the disposition of the case, and leaving the court to decide the case on the basic principles underlying Illinois tort law. To address the question of whether strict liability is appropriate in this case, Posner turns to several foundational 19th century cases, including Rylands v. Fletcher (1868) and Guille v. Swan (1822), and then consults the Restatement (Second) of Torts. Section 520 of the Restatement sets out six factors for determining when strict liability is appropriate: "Guille is a paradigmatic case for strict liability. (a) The risk (probability) of harm was great, and (b) the harm that would ensue if the risk materialized could be .. great ... The confluence of these two factors established the urgency of seeking to prevent such accidents. (c) Yet such accidents could not be prevented by the exercise of due care ... (d) The activity [is] not a matter of common usage ... (e) The activity [is] inappropriate to the place in which it took place ... [and], (f) Reinforcing(d), [is] the value to the community of the activity great enough to offset its unavoidable risks[?]"

Posner explains the relationship between negligence and strict liability as follows:

The baseline common law regime of tort liability is negligence. When it is a workable regime, because the hazards of an activity can be avoided by being careful (which is to say, nonnegligent), there is no need to switch to strict liability. Sometimes, however, a particular type of accident cannot be prevented by taking care but can be avoided, or its consequences minimized, by shifting the activity in which the accident occurs to another locale, where the risk or harm of an accident will be less..., or by reducing the scale of the activity in order to minimize the number of accidents caused by it.... By making the actor strictly liable—by denying him in other words an excuse based on his inability to avoid accidents by being more careful—we give him an incentive, missing in a negligence regime, to experiment with methods of preventing accidents that involve not greater exertions of care, assumed to be futile, but instead relocating, changing, or reducing (perhaps to the vanishing point) the activity giving rise to the accident... The greater the risk of an accident...and the costs of an accident if one occurs..., the more we want the actor to consider the possibility of making accident-reducing activity changes; the stronger, therefore, is the case for strict liability.

Turning from these general principles to the case, Posner states that "we have been given no reason...for believing that a negligence regime is not perfectly adequate to remedy and deter, at reasonable cost, the accidental spillage of acrylonitrile from rail cars." Instead, the court says that under the facts of this case, the chemical spill was caused by the negligence of either (a) the North American Car Corporation in failing to maintain or inspect the rail car properly; (b) American Cyanamid in failing to maintain or inspect the car; or (c) the Missouri Pacific Railroad when it had custody of the rail car. Under a negligence regime, the role of the courts is to consider the evidence and reach a determination as to which party's negligence caused the spill, and the negligent party would then have to pay the cleanup costs. Under a strict liability regime, American Cyanamid would have to pay the cleanup costs, even if it did not act negligently, and the court is not convinced that there are compelling reasons to force American Cyanamid to bear the cleanup costs if it was not negligent.

The court rejected a number of arguments made by Indiana Harbor Belt Railroad as to why strict liability should be applied in this case. Indiana Harbor Belt Railroad argued that the potentially calamitous nature of a chemical spill meant that strict liability should be imposed on shippers shipping hazardous chemicals. The court, however, found that "if a tank car is carefully maintained the danger of a spill of acrylonitrile is negligible. If this is right there is no compelling reason to move to a regime of strict liability."

Indiana Harbor Belt Railroad also argued that a strict liability regime would encourage manufacturers not to ship hazardous materials through densely populated cities and instead choose alternate routes. The court rejected this argument on the grounds that given the US railway system's hub and spoke design, it was difficult for shippers to avoid shipping their goods through densely populated neighborhoods, because the hubs of this system are all located in large cities. The court said that Indiana Harbor Belt Railroad had failed to demonstrate that the shipment of acrylonitrile by rail through populated areas is so hazardous an activity that even when shippers exercise due care, the law should nevertheless create incentives to relocate the activity to nonpopulated areas or to reduce the scale of the activity.

Indiana Harbor Belt Railroad also pointed to concerns of distributional fairness, arguing that American Cyanamid was a huge firm better able to bear the costs of an environmental cleanup, while Indiana Harbor Belt Railroad was a struggling regional railroad that nearly went bankrupt after it was ordered to pay the cleanup costs in this case. The court was unconvinced by this argument, and noted that Indiana Harbor Belt Railroad was a jointly owned subsidiary of Conrail and the Soo Line Railroad (which at the time of the case, fell under the control of the Canadian Pacific Railway, now Canadian Pacific Kansas City, or simply CPKC), corporations with pockets just as deep as American Cyanamid's. The court concluded that concerns about distributional fairness did not therefore require imposing strict liability on shippers. Implicit in much of Posner's reasoning is the idea that, because each of the potential defendants are interlinked in a commercial chain, liability imposed on any one defendant would simply lead to higher prices passed on to the others. This makes an exact determination of where liability lies unnecessary.

The court therefore held that a shipper of a hazardous chemical by rail is not strictly liable for the consequences of a spill or other accident to the shipment en route. A shipper may, however, be held liable if a plaintiff can prove that the shipper acted negligently.
