= László Szombatfalvy =

Businessman (1927–2022)

László Szombatfalvy (9 October 1927 – 10 August 2022) was a businessman and author living in Stockholm, Sweden. Szombatfalvy fled to Sweden in 1956 following the Hungarian uprising of that year. He arrived empty-handed and initially worked a variety of jobs, including as a magician in the refugee camps, before gradually becoming interested in the stock market. His interest in stocks led to his development of a method of risk calculation for investments for which he became well known on the Swedish stock market. In the late 1980s his interests turned toward entirely different matters and he withdrew from the market. Over the last years of his life he focused his attention on the application of his risk assessment method to new fields.

== Early career and stock market trader ==
Szombatfalvy was born in Hungary. He began his stock trading career with 6,000 Swedish Kronor (Crowns) in the mid-1960s. In 1971 Szombatfalvy resigned from his then employment with the Finance Department at Swedish Shell to begin full-time trading in shares. By the time he had celebrated his 60th birthday in 1987, Szombatfalvy's wealth was estimated at 250 million Swedish Kronor, at which point he decided to stop active management of his stock. In 2013, through successful placements of shares on the Swedish Stock Exchange, he had reportedly amassed a personal fortune of one billion Kronor. His private fortune was invested mainly in 10 million shares in the listed Swedish real-estate company, Castellum AB.

=== Stock trading philosophy ===
Szombatfalvy's model for valuation and calculation of risk analysis of shares - with a record of 30 per cent returns per year for 46 years - was the foundation for his reputation as a successful trader on the Swedish stock market. Magnus Angenfelt, a former stock market analyst and co-founder of the hedge fund Manticore, ranked Szombatfalvy as the best investor in Sweden and the third best in the world in his book The World’s 99 Greatest Investors (Swedish - Världens 99 bästa investerare).

Szombatfalvy's philosophy in trading stock is to be a long-term investor, buying companies that are undervalued with low risk. The qualitative model he used to valuate shares in a company didn't have a formula, but built instead partly on a comprehensive analysis of the company itself, and partly on studying the stock market and interviewing people in the market. His analysis of companies also included an in-depth study of the company, its branches and its management, which resulted in both an optimistic and pessimistic long-term prognosis of the company's projected dividend growth. The focus of Szombatfalvy's study was on the dividend growth and the most important key was the company's profits in its own capital, as this shows the company's theoretical dividend and growth capacity.

== Author ==
In November 2009 Szombatfalvy made his debut as an author. In the book The Greatest Challenges of Our Time he briefly analyzes the severe threats facing humanity issuing from four mega-problems: environmental damage, climate change, weapons of mass destruction and extreme poverty. He emphasizes the necessity for politicians to perform risk calculations in order to make the right decisions. The book was translated and released in English in September 2010. At the same time a second (revised) version was released in Swedish.

Szombatfalvy argued that global catastrophic risks should be analysed using structured risk assessment similar to that used in financial markets, and that political decision-making tends to underestimate low-probability, high-impact risks.

He further maintained that the main obstacle to effective risk management is institutional: global risks require coordinated decision-making beyond the nation state, while existing political structures remain based on national sovereignty.

In this context, he argued that improving the capacity of global governance would be necessary to manage such risks effectively.

A recurring theme in Szombatfalvy's work is that global challenges should be analysed through systematic risk assessment. He argued that political decision-making tends to underestimate low-probability, high-impact risks and that institutions should be designed to manage long-term systemic threats rather than isolated policy problems.

The following year, he released his second book, Känslor och förnuft (Emotions and Mind: A book about moral decisions), which discusses the concept of morality and how we should relate to our moral decisions in everyday life, work and in relationships with other people.

== Views on global governance ==
Szombatfalvy viewed global catastrophic risks primarily as a problem of governance capacity rather than technological limitation. He argued that without institutional mechanisms capable of taking binding decisions at the global level, risk mitigation efforts would remain fragmented and insufficient.

== Global Challenges Foundation ==
In March 2013, Szombatfalvy started the Global Challenges Foundation whose aim is to increase awareness of global catastrophic risks and support efforts to improve international cooperation and governance capacity in addressing such risks. Until his death in 2022, Szombatfalvy was the Chairman of the Global Challenges Foundation Board, which also included the former Fourth National Pension Fund's CEO and sustainable investment advocate, Mats Andersson, and Climate Professor Johan Rockström.

The foundation's assets predominantly consist of a donation from Szombatfalvy, which included roughly half of his fortune - around 500 million Swedish kronor.

In 2017, the foundation offered $5 million (USD) to winners of the Global Challenges Foundation Prize 2017 − a contest asking for proposals for a new model capable of solving global problems.
