= Richard Posner =

American federal judge and legal scholar (1939–2026)

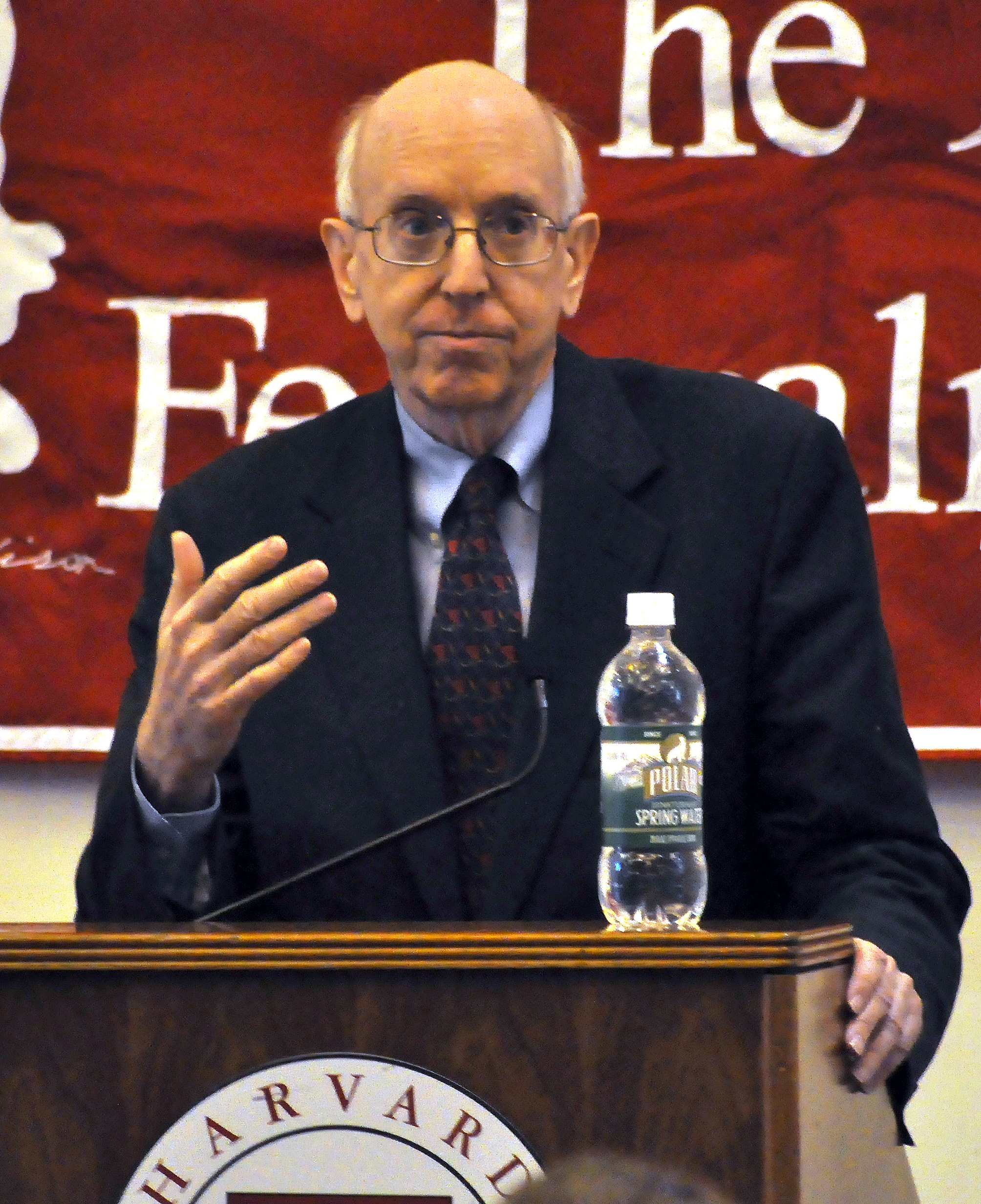
- Posner in 2009

Chief Judge of the United States Court of Appeals for the Seventh Circuit
- In office August 1, 1993 – August 1, 2000
- Preceded by: William J. Bauer
- Succeeded by: Joel Flaum

Judge of the United States Court of Appeals for the Seventh Circuit
- In office December 1, 1981 – September 2, 2017
- Appointed by: Ronald Reagan
- Preceded by: Philip Willis Tone
- Succeeded by: Michael Y. Scudder

Personal details
- Born: Richard Allen Posner; January 11, 1939 New York City, U.S.
- Died: November 10, 2026 (aged 87) Chicago, Illinois, U.S.
- Spouse: Charlene Horn (m. 1962)
- Children: 2, including Eric
- Education: Yale University (BA); Harvard University (LLB)
- Awards: Henry J. Friendly Medal (2005)

Richard Allen Posner (/ˈpoʊznər/; January 11, 1939 – November 10, 2026) was an American legal scholar and United States circuit judge who served on the U.S. Court of Appeals for the Seventh Circuit from 1981 to 2017. Posner was appointed by President Ronald Reagan, and he served as the chief judge of the Seventh Circuit from 1993 to 2000. A former law professor at the University of Chicago, Posner was identified in The Journal of Legal Studies as the most-cited legal scholar of the 20th century. As of 2021, he was also the most-cited American legal scholar of all time. He was widely considered to be one of the most influential legal scholars in the United States.

Posner was known for his scholarly range and for writing on topics outside of law. In his various writings and books, he has addressed animal rights, feminism, drug prohibition, same-sex marriage, Keynesian economics, law and literature, and academic moral philosophy, among other subjects.

He was the author of nearly 40 books on jurisprudence, law and economics, antitrust law, and several other topics, such as Economic Analysis of Law, The Economics of Justice, The Problems of Jurisprudence, Sex and Reason, Law, Pragmatism and Democracy, and The Crisis of Capitalist Democracy. Posner has generally been identified as being politically conservative; towards the end of his tenure on the bench, however, he distanced himself from the positions of the Republican Party, authoring more liberal rulings involving same-sex marriage and abortion. In A Failure of Capitalism, he writes that the 2008 financial crisis caused him to question the rational choice, laissez-faire economic model that lies at the heart of his law and economics theory.

== Early life and education ==
Richard Allen Posner was born on January 11, 1939, in New York City, to Blanche (Hofrichter) and Max Posner. His father's family were of Romanian Jewish descent, and his mother's family were Ashkenazi Jews from Galicia in the Austrian Empire. His parents were both involved in Communist Party activities. The family moved to Scarsdale, New York once Max became a lawyer, focusing on property law.

After high school, Posner studied English literature at Yale University, graduating in 1959 with a B.A., summa cum laude, and membership in Phi Beta Kappa. He majored in English, writing a 321-page study of the late poetry of W. B. Yeats, supervised by Cleanth Brooks. He then attended Harvard Law School, where he was president of the Harvard Law Review. He graduated in 1962 ranked first in his class with an LL.B., magna cum laude.

== Legal career ==
External videos
- Discussion with Posner and his biographer William Domnarski at the Seminary Coop Bookstore in Chicago

After law school, Posner was a law clerk to Justice William J. Brennan Jr. of the U.S. Supreme Court from 1962 to 1963. He then served as an attorney-advisor to Commissioner Philip Elman of the Federal Trade Commission (FTC); he would later argue that the FTC ought to be abolished. Posner went on to work in the Office of the Solicitor General in the United States Department of Justice, under Solicitor General Thurgood Marshall.

In 1968, Posner accepted a position teaching at Stanford Law School. In 1969, Posner moved to the faculty of the University of Chicago Law School, primiarily teaching courses on torts, antitrust law and economic analysis of law. He was a founding editor of The Journal of Legal Studies in 1972.

On October 27, 1981, Posner was nominated by President Ronald Reagan to a seat on the United States Court of Appeals for the Seventh Circuit vacated by Judge Philip Willis Tone. Posner was confirmed by the United States Senate on November 24, 1981, and received his commission on December 1, 1981. He served as Chief Judge of that court from 1993 to 2000 but remained a part-time senior lecturer at the University of Chicago. Judge Posner retired from the federal bench on September 2, 2017. Posner stated that he had originally planned to retire at the age of 80, but instead retired at 78 due to disputes with other judges on the Seventh Circuit over treatment of pro se litigants.

Posner was a pragmatist in philosophy and an economist in legal methodology. He wrote many articles and books on a wide range of topics including law and economics, law and literature, the federal judiciary, moral theory, intellectual property, antitrust law, public intellectuals, and legal history. He is also well-known for writing on a wide variety of current events including the 2000 presidential election recount controversy, Bill Clinton's affair with Monica Lewinsky and his resulting impeachment procedure, and the 2003 invasion of Iraq.

His analysis of the Lewinsky scandal cut across most party and ideological divisions, criticizing the conduct and arguments of involved parties across the political spectrum. Legal philosopher Ronald Dworkin disputed Posner's asserted nonpartisanship on the scandal, arguing that Posner's book on the subject supported Republican positions on several points of contention. Posner's greatest influence is through his writings on law and economics; the legal scholar William Kovacic, quoted in a 1999 New York Times article, called him "one of the most important antitrust scholars of the past half-century". In December 2004, Posner started a joint blog with Nobel Prize-winning economist Gary Becker, titled simply "The Becker-Posner Blog". Both men contributed to the blog until shortly before Becker's death in May 2014, after which Posner announced that the blog was being discontinued. He also had a blog at The Atlantic, where he discussed the then-current Great Recession.

Posner was mentioned in 2005 as a potential nominee to replace Sandra Day O'Connor because of his prominence as a scholar and an appellate judge. Robert S. Boynton wrote in The Washington Post that he believed Posner would never sit on the Supreme Court because despite his "obvious brilliance", he would be criticized for his occasionally "outrageous conclusions", such as his contention "that the rule of law is an accidental and dispensable element of legal ideology", his argument that buying and selling children on the free market would lead to better outcomes than the present situation, government-regulated adoption, and his support for the legalization of marijuana and LSD.

Posner on Posner Series

Posner was the focus of a series of posts (many Q&A interviews with the Judge) done by University of Washington Law Professor Ronald K. L. Collins. The twelve posts—collectively titled "Posner on Posner"—began on November 24, 2014, and ended on January 5, 2015, and appeared on the Concurring Opinions blog.

== Legal and philosophical positions ==
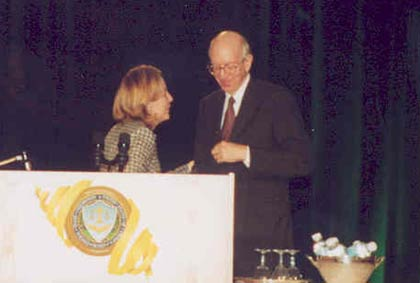
Judge Posner making a dinner speech at the Federal Trade Commission

In Posner's youth and in the 1960s as law clerk to William J. Brennan, he was generally counted as a liberal. However, in reaction to some of the perceived excesses of the late 1960s, Posner developed a strongly conservative bent. He encountered Chicago School economists Aaron Director and George Stigler while a professor at Stanford. Posner summarized his views on law and economics in his 1973 book The Economic Analysis of Law.

Today, although generally viewed as to the right in academia, Posner's pragmatism, his qualified moral relativism and moral skepticism, and his affection for the ideas of Friedrich Nietzsche set him apart from most American conservatives. As a judge, with the exception of his rulings with respect to the sentencing guidelines and the recording of police actions, Posner's judicial votes have always placed him on the moderate-to-liberal wing of the Republican Party, where he became more isolated over time. In July 2012, Posner stated, "I've become less conservative since the Republican Party started becoming goofy." Among Posner's judicial influences are the American jurists Oliver Wendell Holmes Jr. and Learned Hand; he has written that "Holmes is the greatest jurist ... because the sum of his ideas, metaphors, decisions, dissents and other contributions exceeds the sum of contributions of any other jurist of modern times", and he has applied the Hand formula in a number of his opinions.

=== Legal value of the Constitution and Supreme Court precedents ===
In June 2016, Posner was criticized by right-wing media organizations for a column he wrote for Slate in which he stated, "I see absolutely no value to a judge of spending decades, years, months, weeks, days, hours, minutes, or seconds studying the Constitution, the history of its enactment, its amendments, and its implementation."

He called his approach to judging pragmatic. "I pay very little attention to legal rules, statutes, constitutional provisions. ... A case is just a dispute. The first thing you do is ask yourself—forget about the law—what is a sensible resolution of this dispute? The next thing ... is to see if a recent Supreme Court precedent or some other legal obstacle stood in the way of ruling in favor of that sensible resolution. And the answer is that's actually rarely the case. When you have a Supreme Court case or something similar, they're often extremely easy to get around."

=== Abortion ===
Posner wrote several opinions sympathetic to abortion rights, including a decision that held that late term abortion was constitutionally protected in some circumstances.

In November 2015, Posner authored a decision in Planned Parenthood of Wisconsin v. Schimel striking down regulations on abortion clinics in Wisconsin. He rejected the state's argument that the laws were written to protect the health of women and not to make abortion more difficult to obtain. Accusing the state of indirectly trying to ban abortions in the state Posner wrote, "They [Wisconsin] may do this in the name of protecting the health of women who have abortions, yet as in this case the specific measures they support may do little or nothing for health, but rather strew impediments to abortion."

=== Animal rights ===
Posner rejected an ethic of strong animal rights on pragmatic grounds (where such an ethic posits the moral irrelevance of species membership). He recognizes the philosophical force of arguments for strong animal rights, but maintains that human intuition about the paramount value of human life makes it impossible to accommodate an ethic of strong animal rights. Posner, a self-avowed moral anti-realist, does not present his critique of strong animal rights as a deductive proof. Instead, he highlights the practical importance of intuition and emotion over abstract argument.

In a 2000 Yale Law Journal book review on the title Rattling the Cage by Steven M. Wise, Posner again criticized the legal notion of animal rights. In the review, Posner argues that Wise's approach, using the cognitive ability of animals compared to that of very young normal human beings as a basis for rights-worthiness, is arbitrary and in contrast with major traditional and contemporary philosophies (including the theology of Thomas Aquinas for one and utilitarianism for another). In addition, he points out that this basis for rights has problematic implications—including that it might soon make some computers more worthy of rights than some humans, a conclusion he calls absurd. Posner goes on to reason that granting human-like rights to animals is fraught with implications which could radically disrupt or devalue the rights of human beings. He alludes to Hitler's fondness for animals as evidence that respect for animals and humaneness toward human beings are not necessarily associated. Arguing that the analogy of animal rights to the civil rights movement lacks imagination and is not very apt, Posner posits that animal welfare might be better protected by other legal models, one example of which would be stronger laws making animals property, since, he asserts, people tend to protect what they own.

He engaged in a debate with the philosopher Peter Singer in 2001 at Slate magazine. He agrees that "gratuitous cruelty to and neglect of animals is wrong and that some costs should be incurred to reduce the suffering of animals raised for food or other human purposes or subjected to medical or other testing and experimentation", but rejects grounding this view in an ethic of strong animal rights, contending that such a premise entails conclusions inconsistent with the reality of human society and psychology. He further states that people whose opinions were changed by consideration of the philosophical arguments presented in Singer's book Animal Liberation failed to see the "radicalism of the ethical vision that powers [their] view on animals, an ethical vision that finds greater value in a healthy pig than in a profoundly retarded child, that commands inflicting a lesser pain on a human being to avert a greater pain to a dog, and that, provided only that a chimpanzee has 1 percent of the mental ability of a normal human being, would require the sacrifice of the human being to save 101 chimpanzees".

Posner emphasized the importance of facts over arguments in creating social change. He stated that his moral intuition said that "it is wrong to give as much weight to a dog's pain as to an infant's pain", and that "[this] is a moral intuition deeper than any reason that could be given for it and impervious to any reason that you or anyone could give against it". Instead, Posner claims that "[expanding and invigorating] the laws that protect animals will require not philosophical arguments for reducing human beings to the level of the other animals but facts, facts that will stimulate a greater empathetic response to animal suffering and facts that will alleviate concern about the human costs of further measures to reduce animal suffering".

=== Antitrust ===
Along with Robert Bork, Posner helped shape the antitrust policy changes of the 1970s through his idea that 1960s antitrust laws were in fact making prices higher for the consumer rather than lower, while he viewed lower prices as the essential end goal of any antitrust policy. Posner's and Bork's theories on antitrust evolved into the prevailing view in academia and at the Justice Department in the George H. W. Bush administration; they have remained the consensus view in both the Justice Department and among legal academics of antitrust.

=== The Bluebook ===
The Bluebook is the style guide that prescribes the most widely used legal citation system in the United States. Ilya Somin called Posner "one of the founding fathers of Bluebook abolitionism, having advocated it for almost twenty-five years, ever since his 1986 University of Chicago Law Review article on the subject". In a 2011 Yale Law Journal article, Posner wrote:

The Bluebook: A Uniform System of Citation exemplifies hypertrophy in the anthropological sense. It is a monstrous growth, remote from the functional need for legal citation forms, that serves obscure needs of the legal culture and its student subculture.

He described those needs as unrelated to practical legal activity but instead as social and political.

In the same article, Posner gives an excerpt of the entire citation style guide included (as an appendix) in the short manual he gives his own law clerks (whom he describes as "very smart"); the appendix is about two to three pages long, and he says the entire manual is about 1% as long as the Bluebook.

=== Drugs ===
Posner opposed the U.S. "war on drugs" and called it "quixotic". In a 2003 CNBC interview he discussed the difficulty of enforcing criminal marijuana laws, and asserted that it is hard to justify the criminalization of marijuana when compared to other substances. In a talk at Elmhurst College in 2012, Posner said that "I don't think that we should have a fraction of the drug laws that we have. I think it's really absurd to be criminalizing possession or use or distribution of marijuana."

=== National security ===
At the Cybercrime 2020: The Future of Online Crime and Investigations conference held at Georgetown University Law Center on November 20, 2014, Posner, in addition to further reinforcing his views on privacy being over-rated, stated that "If the NSA wants to vacuum all the trillions of bits of information that are crawling through the electronic worldwide networks, I think that's fine. ... Much of what passes for the name of privacy is really just trying to conceal the disreputable parts of your conduct", Posner added. "Privacy is mainly about trying to improve your social and business opportunities by concealing the sorts of bad activities that would cause other people not to want to deal with you." Posner also criticized mobile OS companies for enabling end-to-end encryption in their newest software. "I'm shocked at the thought that a company would be permitted to manufacture an electronic product that the government would not be able to search" he said.

=== Patent and copyright law ===
Posner expressed concerns, on the blog he contributed to with Gary Becker, that both patent and copyright protection, though particularly the former, may be excessive. He argues that the cost of inventing must be compared to the cost of copying in order to determine the optimal patent protection for an inventor. When patent protection is too strongly in favor of the inventor, market efficiency is decreased. He illustrates his argument by comparing the pharmaceutical industry (where the cost of invention is high) with the software industry (where the cost of invention is relatively low). However, Posner suggested that strengthening copyright law, including a possible bar on linking to or paraphrasing copyrighted materials, may be necessary as a means to prevent what he views as free riding on newspaper journalism. His co-blogger Gary Becker simultaneously posted a contrasting opinion that while the Internet might hurt newspapers, it will not harm the vitality of the press, but rather embolden it.

=== Police recording ===
In 2011, a three-judge panel on the 7th Circuit was weighing a challenge to the Illinois Eavesdropping Act, which barred the secret recording of conversations without the consent of all the parties to the conversation. At issue was the constitutionality of the Illinois wiretapping law, as it prevented the filming of arrests that took place in public. Posner interrupted the ACLU after just 14 words, stating, "Yeah, I know. But I'm not interested, really, in what you want to do with these recordings of people's encounters with the police" and that "Once all this stuff can be recorded, there's going to be a lot more of this snooping around by reporters and bloggers. [...] I'm always suspicious when the civil liberties people start telling the police how to do their business." The 7th Circuit upheld the challenge, 2–1, striking down the Eavesdropping Act, but Posner wrote a dissenting opinion.

=== Prisoners ===
In a dissent from an earlier ruling by his protégé Frank Easterbrook, Posner wrote that Easterbrook's decision that female guards could watch male prisoners while in the shower or bathroom must stem from a belief that prisoners are "members of a different species, indeed as a type of vermin, devoid of human dignity and entitled to no respect. ... I do not myself consider the 1.5 million inmates of American prisons and jails in that light."

=== Race and public education ===
Posner's views of public education policy are informed by his view that groups of students differ in intellectual ability, and therefore, that it is faulty to impose uniform educational standards on all schools. His view in this regard is undergirded by his view that different races differ in intelligence. In a blog post, Posner wrote, "I suggest that the only worthwhile reforms of teacher compensation are raising teacher wages uniformly, providing recognition and modest bonuses for outstanding teachers, and increasing hiring standards." In the same post, he wrote, "I am not clear what we should think the problem of American education (below the college level) is. Most children of middle-class ... Americans are white or Asian and attend good public or private schools, usually predominantly white. The average white IQ is of course 100 and the Asian (like the Jewish) almost one standard deviation higher, that is, 115. The average black IQ is 85, a full standard deviation below the white average, and the average Hispanic IQ has been estimated recently at 89. Black children in particular often come from disordered households, which has a negative effect on ability to learn and perhaps indeed on IQ. ... Increasingly, black and Hispanic students find themselves in schools with few white or Asian students. The challenge to American education is to provide a useful education to the large number of Americans who are unlikely to benefit from a college education or from high school courses aimed at preparing students for college."

=== Same-sex marriage ===
In September 2014, Posner authored the opinions in the consolidated cases of Wolf v. Walker and Baskin v. Bogan challenging Wisconsin and Indiana's state level same-sex marriage bans. The opinion of the three-judge panel on the 7th Circuit Court of Appeals ruled that Indiana and Wisconsin's bans on same-sex marriage were unconstitutional, affirming a lower court ruling. During oral arguments, Wisconsin's attorney general cited tradition as a reason for maintaining the ban, prompting Posner to note that: "It was tradition to not allow blacks and whites to marry—a tradition that got swept away." Though Posner argued in his 1992 book Sex and Reason that prohibitions against gay marriage were rationally justified, he held in the 2014 cases that the same-sex marriage bans were both "a tradition of hate" and "savage discrimination". Posner wrote the opinion for the unanimous panel, finding the laws unconstitutional under the Equal Protection Clause. The Supreme Court then denied a writ of certiorari and left Posner's ruling to stand.

=== Torture ===
When reviewing Alan Dershowitz's book, Why Terrorism Works: Understanding the Threat, Responding to the Challenge, Posner wrote in the September 2002 The New Republic, "If torture is the only means of obtaining the information necessary to prevent the detonation of a nuclear bomb in Times Square, torture should be used – and will be used – to obtain the information. ... No one who doubts that this is the case should be in a position of responsibility."

=== Voter identification laws ===
In 2007, Posner wrote the majority opinion upholding Indiana's photo identification law in the Crawford v. Marion County Election Board case. He wrote that "absence of prosecutions" for voter fraud is explained in part by "the extreme difficulty of apprehending a voter impersonator", and that such impersonators are "almost impossible to catch without a voter ID requirement". The law was subsequently upheld at the United States Supreme Court. In 2013, Posner disavowed support for the ruling due to concerns about voter suppression caused by the law. He stated that judges "weren't given the information that would enable that balance to be struck" between preventing fraud and protecting voters' rights. In 2014, Posner wrote a 30-page dissent opposing the upholding of a Wisconsin voter ID law.

== Judicial career ==
Posner was one of the most prolific legal writers, through both the number and topical breadth of his opinions, to say nothing of his scholarly and popular writings. Unlike most federal judges, Posner wrote all his legal opinions himself, instead of having his law clerks draft them for him to edit. Nobel Laureate economist Robert Solow says that Posner "is an apparently inexhaustible writer on ... nearly everything. To call him a polymath would be a gross understatement. ... Judge Posner evidently writes the way other men breathe", though the economist describes the judge's grasp of economics as, "in some respects, ... precarious".

In 1999, Posner was welcomed as a private mediator among the parties involved in the Microsoft antitrust case.

A 2000 study published by Fred Shapiro in the University of Chicago's Journal of Legal Studies found that Posner is the most-cited legal scholar of all time by a considerable margin, as Posner's work has generated 7,981 cites compared to the runner-up Ronald Dworkin's 4,488 cites. In 2021, using a modified methodology (including the HeinOnline database and searches for citations to books), Shapiro found that Posner was the most-cited United States legal scholar, generating 48,852 cites to runner-up Cass Sunstein's 35,584.

=== Notable cases ===
In his decision in the 1997 case State Oil Co. v. Khan, Posner wrote that a ruling 1968 antitrust precedent set by the Supreme Court was "moth-eaten", "wobbly", and "unsound". Nevertheless, he abided by the previous decision in his ruling. The Supreme Court granted certiorari and overturned the 1968 ruling unanimously; Sandra Day O'Connor wrote the opinion and spoke positively of both Posner's criticism and his decision to abide by the ruling until the Court decided to change it.

==== Tort law ====
In U.S. Fidelity & Guaranty Co. v. Jadranska Slobodna Plovidba, 683 F.2d 1022 (7th Cir. 1982), Posner revived Learned Hand's economic efficiency theory of negligence law.

In Indiana Harbor Belt Railroad Co. v. American Cyanamid Co. (1990), Posner lowered the standard of legal liability a railroad faced for a hazardous waste spill from strict liability to negligence. The case became a staple of first year torts courses taught in American law schools, where the cases is used as a contrast to other cases in which similarly dangerous activities are held to a strict liability standard.

In 1999, Posner applied the lex loci delicti commissi rule on choice of law rather than the Restatement of Torts, Second when rejecting a claim by an Illinois dentist who slipped and fell in Acapulco, Mexico. In 2003, Posner affirmed a punitive damages award of 37.2 times the compensatory damages guests won from a bedbug-infested Motel 6. In 2003, Posner found that co-workers who did not prevent a hypoglycemic diabetic's fatal attempt to drive himself home violated no duty to rescue.

==== Contract law ====
In Morin Building Products Co. v. Baystone Construction, Inc. (1983), Posner held that the Uniform Commercial Code presumes contracts impose an objective standard upon what would subjectively be illusory promises. In 1987, Posner dissented when Judge Frank H. Easterbrook, joined by Richard Dickson Cudahy, found that a stockbroker could sue his former employer under SEC Rule 10b-5 after he quit shortly before the firm's lucrative unannounced merger. In 1990, Posner found that Delaware corporate law did not permit an airline's board to adopt a poison pill provision that encouraged its machinists to take strike action if its pilots' takeover attempt succeeded. In 1991, Posner held that good faith performance is a factual question of the defendant's state of mind that must be proven at trial.

==== Civil rights ====
In 1984, Posner wrote for the en banc circuit when it held that a consent decree regulating law enforcement Red Squads did not apply to FBI terrorism investigations, over the dissent of Judge Richard Dickson Cudahy. In January 2001, Posner loosened that consent decree to allow the Chicago Police Department to conduct counterterrorism operations.

In United States v. Marshall (1990), Posner dissented when Frank H. Easterbrook, writing for the en banc circuit, held that the punishment for possession of LSD is determined by the weight of the carrier it is found within. The circuit's judgment was affirmed, under the name Chapman v. United States (1991), by the Supreme Court of the United States.

In 1995, Posner, joined by Judge Walter J. Cummings Jr., affirmed an injunction blocking Illinois from closing schools on Good Friday as a violation of the Establishment Clause, over the dissent of Judge Daniel Anthony Manion. In 2000, Posner found that partners at a big law firm could be considered employees with regard to the Age Discrimination in Employment Act of 1967. Posner found that secondary liability attaches to a file sharing service for contributory copyright infringement in In re Aimster Copyright Litigation (2003).

== Personal life and death ==
Posner and his wife lived in Hyde Park, Chicago, for many years. His son Eric Posner is also a prominent legal scholar and teaches at the University of Chicago Law School. Posner was a self-described "cat person" and was devoted to his Maine Coon, Pixie. Posner appeared with his previous cat, a Maine Coon named Dinah, in a photograph accompanying a lengthy profile (of Posner) in The New Yorker in 2001. He was known to illustrate legal points in his opinions with elaborate cat-related metaphors and examples.

Posner was diagnosed with Alzheimer's disease in early 2018, approximately six months after leaving the bench, and as of 2022 resided at a nursing facility.

Posner died in Chicago on November 10, 2026, at the age of 87.

== Awards and honors ==
A 2004 poll by Legal Affairs magazine named Posner as one of the top twenty legal thinkers in the U.S.

In March 2007, the Harvard Law Review dedicated an issue of faculty-written case comments in tribute of Judge Posner. In 2008, the University of Chicago Law Review published a commemorative issue: Commemorating Twenty-five Years of Judge Richard A. Posner. One of Posner's former clerks, Tim Wu, calls Posner "probably America's greatest living jurist". Another of Posner's former legal clerks, Lawrence Lessig, wrote, "There isn't a federal judge I respect more, both as a judge and person." The former dean of Yale Law School, Anthony T. Kronman, said that Posner was "one of the most rational human beings" he had ever met.

== Selected works ==
=== Books ===
- 1973 Economic Analysis of Law, 1st ed.
  - 2007 Economic Analysis of Law, 7th ed., ISBN 978-0-7355-6354-4
  - 2010 Economic Analysis of Law, 8th ed., ISBN 978-0-7355-9442-5
  - 2014 Economic Analysis of Law, 9th ed.
- 1978 Antitrust Law: An Economic Perspective
  - 2001 Antitrust Law, 2nd ed., ISBN 978-0-226-67576-3
- 1981 The Economics of Justice, ISBN 978-0-674-23526-7
- 1985 The Federal Courts: Crisis and Reform
  - 1996 The Federal Courts: Challenge and Reform (2d ed.), ISBN 978-0-674-29627-5
- 1988 Law and Literature: A Misunderstood Relation, ISBN 978-0-674-51468-3
  - 1998 Law and Literature (revised and enlarged ed.), ISBN 978-0-674-51471-3
  - 2009 Law and Literature, 3rd. ed., ISBN 978-0-674-03246-0
- 1990 The Problems of Jurisprudence, ISBN 978-0-674-70876-1
- 1990 Cardozo: A Study in Reputation, ISBN 978-0-226-67556-5
- 1992 Sex and Reason, ISBN 978-0-674-80280-3
- 1995 Overcoming Law, ISBN 978-0-674-64926-2, Among the topics is a critique of Robert Bork's constitutional theories, review of books about the legal system in the Third Reich, and a discussion of the legal culture reflected in the works of Tom Wolfe and E.M. Forster.
- 1995 Aging and Old Age, ISBN 978-0-226-67568-8
- 1996 Law and Legal Theory in England and America, ISBN 978-0-19-826471-2
- 1999 The Problematics of Moral and Legal Theory, ISBN 978-0-674-00799-4
- 1999 An Affair of State: The Investigation, Impeachment, and Trial of President Clinton. Cambridge, Mass.: Harvard University Press, ISBN 978-0-674-00080-3.
- 2001 Frontiers of Legal Theory, ISBN 978-0-674-01360-5
- 2001 Breaking the Deadlock: The 2000 Presidential Election and the Courts, ISBN 978-0-691-09073-3
- 2002 Public Intellectuals: A Study of Decline, ISBN 978-0-674-00633-1
- 2003 Law, Pragmatism and Democracy, ISBN 978-0-674-01081-9
- 2003 The Economic Structure of Intellectual Property Law (Harvard Univ. Press) (with William Landes), ISBN 978-0-674-01204-2
- 2004 Catastrophe: Risk and Response, ISBN 978-0-19-530647-7
- 2005 Preventing Surprise Attacks: Intelligence Reform in the Wake of 9/11, ISBN 978-0-7425-4947-0
- 2006 Uncertain Shield: The U.S. Intelligence System in the Throes of Reform, ISBN 978-0-7425-5127-5
- 2006 Not a Suicide Pact: The Constitution in a Time of National Emergency, ISBN 978-0-19-530427-5
- 2007 The Little Book of Plagiarism, ISBN 978-0-375-42475-5
- 2007 Countering Terrorism: Blurred Focus, Halting Steps, ISBN 978-0-7425-5883-0
- 2008 How Judges Think, ISBN 978-0-674-02820-3
- 2009 A Failure of Capitalism: The Crisis of '08 and the Descent into Depression, ISBN 978-0-674-03514-0
- 2009 Uncommon Sense: Economic Insights, from Marriage to Terrorism (with Gary Becker)
- 2010 The Crisis of Capitalist Democracy, ISBN 978-0-674-05574-2
- 2013 Reflections on Judging
- 2013 The Behavior of Federal Judges, ISBN 978-0-674-04989-5 (with Lee Epstein and William Landes)
- 2016 Divergent Paths: The Academy and the Judiciary
- 2017 The Federal Judiciary: Strengths and Weaknesses

=== Articles ===
- Posner, Richard A. (1969). "Natural Monopoly and Its Regulation". Stanford Law Review. 21 (3): 548–643. doi:10.2307/1227624. JSTOR 1227624.
- — (1969). "The Federal Trade Commission". University of Chicago Law Review. 37 (1): 47–89. JSTOR 1599016.
- — (1972). "A Theory of Negligence". Journal of Legal Studies. 1 (1): 29–96. doi:10.1086/467478.
- — (1973). "An Economic Approach to Legal Procedure and Judicial Administration". Journal of Legal Studies. 2 (2): 399–458. doi:10.1086/467503. JSTOR 724058.
- —; Ehrlich, Isaac (1974). "An Economic Analysis of Legal Rulemaking". Journal of Legal Studies. 3 (1): 257–96. doi:10.1086/467515. JSTOR 724127.
- —; Landes, William M. (1975). "The Independent Judiciary in an Interest-Group Perspective" (PDF). Journal of Law & Economics. 18 (3): 875–902. doi:10.1086/466849. JSTOR 725070.
- —; Landes, Elisabeth M. (1978). "The Economics of the Baby Shortage". Journal of Legal Studies. 7 (2): 323–48. doi:10.1086/467597.
- — (1978). "The Right of Privacy". Georgia Law Review. 12 (3): 393–422.
- — (1979). "Utilitarianism, Economics, and Legal Theory". Journal of Legal Studies. 8 (1): 103–40. doi:10.1086/467603. JSTOR 724048.
- — (1979). "The Chicago School of Antitrust Analysis". University of Pennsylvania Law Review. 127 (4): 925–48. JSTOR 3311787.
- — (1980). "The Ethical and Political Basis of the Efficiency Norm in Common Law Adjudication". Hofstra Law Review. 8 (3): 487–508.
- —; Landes, William M. (1981). "Market Power in Antitrust Cases". Harvard Law Review. 94 (5): 937–96. JSTOR 1340687.
- — (1983). "Statutory Interpretation—in the Classroom and in the Courtroom". University of Chicago Law Review. 50 (2): 800–22. JSTOR 1599510.
- — (1985). "An Economic Theory of the Criminal Law". Columbia Law Review. 85 (6): 1193–1231. JSTOR 1122392.
- —; Landes, William M. (1987). "Trademark Law: An Economic Perspective". Journal of Law & Economics. 30 (2): 265–310. doi:10.1086/467138. JSTOR 725498.
- — (1987). "The Decline of Law As an Autonomous Discipline: 1962–1987". Harvard Law Review. 100 (4): 761–80. JSTOR 1341093.
- —; Landes, William M. (1989). "An Economic Analysis of Copyright Law". Journal of Legal Studies. 18 (2): 325–64. doi:10.1086/468150. JSTOR 3085624.
- — (1998). "Rational Choice, Behavioral Economics, and the Law". Stanford Law Review. 50 (5): 1551–76. JSTOR 1229305.
- — (1999). "An Economic Approach to the Law of Evidence". Stanford Law Review. 51 (2): 1477–1546. JSTOR 1229527.

== See also ==
- American philosophy
- International Airport Centers, L.L.C. v. Citrin (2006)
- List of law clerks for the third seat of the Supreme Court of the United States
- List of Jewish American jurists
- Moore v. Madigan (2012)
- Schurz Communications, Inc. v. FCC (1992)
- United States v. Garcia (2007)
- List of United States federal judges by longevity of service

Legal offices
Preceded by Philip Willis Tone	Judge of the United States Court of Appeals for the Seventh Circuit; 1981–2017	Succeeded by Michael Y. Scudder
Preceded by William J. Bauer	Chief Judge of the United States Court of Appeals for the Seventh Circuit; 1993–2000	Succeeded by Joel Flaum
