= American Dream Downpayment Assistance Act =

On December 16, 2003, President George W. Bush signed into law the American Dream Downpayment Initiative (Pub. L. 108–186 (text) (PDF)), which was aimed at helping approximately "40,000 families a year" with their down payment and closing costs, and further strengthen America’s housing market. This legislation complemented the President's "aggressive housing agenda" announced in a speech he gave at the Department of Housing and Urban Development on June 18, 2002.

Using the abbreviation "ADDI," this funding was provided as a component of the HOME Investment Partnerships Program (HOME) which is a block grant program providing states and eligible cities and counties with annual funding toward a range of affordable housing activities. ADDI funding was last appropriated in federal fiscal year 2007 and has not received further specific funding since. However, providing down payment assistance to income-eligible buyers has always been an eligible use of HOME funds, so many of the state and local governments that receive HOME funds, called "participating jurisdictions" or "PJs," continue to operate down payment assistance programs locally. Due to the block grant nature of HOME, local programs may vary based on the policies adopted by the specific PJ. Since 2013, buyers receiving down payment assistance from HOME are required to participate in pre-purchasing homeownership counseling, and in August 2021 full implementation of HUD regulations requiring counseling be provided by certified counselors employed by HUD-approved housing counseling agencies took effect standardizing the curriculum and quality of such counseling.
