= Schurz Communications, Inc. v. FCC =

- Court: United States Court of Appeals for the Seventh Circuit
- Full case name: Schurz Communications v. Federal Communications Commission and the United States of America
- Argued: October 2 1992
- Decided: November 5, 1992
- Citation: 982 F. 2d 1043 (7th Cir. 1992)

Case history
- Subsequent history: Motion for disqualification denied, 982 F.2d 1057 (7th Cir. 1993)

Court membership
- Judges sitting: William J. Bauer, Richard Posner, Thomas E. Fairchild

Case opinions
- Majority: Posner, joined by Bauer, Fairchild

Schurz Communications v. Federal Communications Commission and the United States of America, 982 F. 2d 1043 (7th Cir. 1992), held in the United States Court of Appeals for the Seventh Circuit, was argued on October 2, 1992 and decided on November 5, 1992. The case dealt with the justification of the FCC's regulation of the way television networks are allowed to distribute and produce programs into syndication. Judge Richard Posner was the circuit judge for the case. This case challenged syndication and financial rules imposed in the 1970s, as broadcast television changed with the popularity of cable television, the rise of the FOX network, and the discrediting of the leverage theory.

== Broadcast Structure ==
The broadcast television industry has a structure of three main role players:

Networks
The network is a vertically integrated media corporation. They generally own in-house production facilities in order to produce their own television video programming (although some networks work with outside production teams). They own and operate television stations in major markets (such as Los Angeles and New York), and connect with independently owned television stations throughout the entire nation, known as "affiliates", maintaining telecommunications links among all these stations to distribute video programming. Network leadership makes decisions about programming at every level: production, distribution and consumption.

Affiliates
Affiliates are TV stations with a link to a major network; however, affiliates will seek independent and original programming as well for non-network time slots. Affiliates receive "network feeds" but also produce local news and sports programming, and broadcast syndicated programs.

Independents
Independents are TV stations that are not affiliated with a network. An independent station is responsible for obtaining programming for the entire broadcast day on a program-by-program basis from a number of sources. Independents primarily run syndicated content, such as theatrical movies as well as broadcast series that have previously aired. Some programming comes from shows that have been produced specifically for independent stations.

== Key Terms ==
Vertical Integration: The business model where one owner controls the production, distribution and consumption of a good. In this case, vertical integration specifically refers to the distribution and production monopoly of television shows by the CBS, NBC, and ABC television networks.

Leverage Theory: The theory that a company which has economic power in one market could use their power to obtain a monopoly in another market.

Television syndication: The selling of the rights to air programs to different stations.

First-Run Syndication: Programming that is broadcast for the first time as a syndicated show. Examples of first-run are talk shows, like the Oprah Winfrey and Tyra Banks shows, and game shows like Wheel of Fortune.

Off Network Syndication: The sale of a program that was originally run on network television. Examples of off-network programs are Sex and the City and Friends.

Prime Time Access Rule (PTAR): A rule instated by the Federal Communications Commission (FCC) in 1970 to restrict the amount of network programming that network-affiliated stations may air during what it known as "prime time".

== Syndication and Financial Rules ==
Rules were imposed in 1970 by the FCC to ensure that television networks, NBC, CBS and ABC, had limited power regarding television programming. With these rules in place, the major networks were not permitted to syndicate shows that were made by the network to be rebroadcast by other independent stations, that weren't owned by or affiliated with the network. The stations were also forbidden to purchase the syndication rights for programs produced outside the network. In 1990, the FCC at the request of FOX, initiated a notice-and-comment rule-making proceeding. Until this time, what to do with the rules remained in limbo. After this hearing and receiving numerous submissions from the various elements of the television industry, a hearing was held. The Commission held a one-day hearing after which it issued an opinion, over the dissents of two of the five commissioners. The new rules are different in several ways —one of which is that they define 'network' as an entity that supplies at least 15 hours of prime time programming to interconnected affiliates.

== Brief Timeline ==
1970 — FCC adopts financial interest and syndication rules designed to limit power of three major networks - CBS, NBC, and ABC.

1980 — The commission orders an extensive staff study which concludes that the rules are obsolete and it is recommended that they be abandoned.

1983 — FCC issued tentative decision agreeing with the staff proposing radical revisions in the rules.

1990 — FCC at the request of FOX initiates a fresh notice-and-comment rule making proceeding

1990 — Commission held a one-day hearing, after which it disseminated a revised set of financial interest and syndication rules.

1992 — Schurz Communications v. Federal Communications Commission

== Decision ==
Schurz Communications v FCC and USA

Decided

November 5, 1992 by Judge Posner, US Court of Appeals for the Seventh Circuit

Decision

Order is Vacated and the matter is returned to the Commission for further proceedings.

Rationale

The Commission's rules were arbitrary.

1. The Commission did not clearly define the term diversity nor distinguish among different types of diversity

2. The statute provides no guidance of authority other than to say that the Commission is to act in accordance with the public interest.

3. The rules are so complicated that it is unclear whether they are more or less restrictive than the rules they modified.

The FCC did not take into consideration changes in the media.

1. The 40% limitation on the amount of prime-time entertainment that a network can supply from its in-house production is a new restriction on the networks, having no counterpart in the original 1970 rules. The networks argue that the new rules do not increase their access to the programming market and in fact decrease it.

2.With so much of the country now having cable television and many more getting access to it, not only is programming for small audiences with specialized tastes is feasible, but there is also greater competition for the networks.

3. Whereas in the 1970s networks held 90% of prime time audiences, today it is only at 62%

4.A television station is only allowed to buy syndication rights to a program from an outside producer as long as the producer does so pursuant to separate negotiations begun at least 30 days after the network and the producer have agreed on the fee for licensing the network to exhibit the program. Even at that point the network cannot do the syndication, it must hire an independent syndicator to arrange distribution to independent stations. This discourages the entry of new producers and in so doing reduces diversity both of program sources and of program outlets.

5. The unrestricted sale of syndication rights to networks would strengthen the production industry and thereby increase programming diversity by enabling a sharing between fledgling producers and the networks of the risks of new production. A rule telling someone he may not do business with some firm believed to have market power is unlikely to make the person better off.
