= Feminism of Madonna =

Aspect of Madonna's career

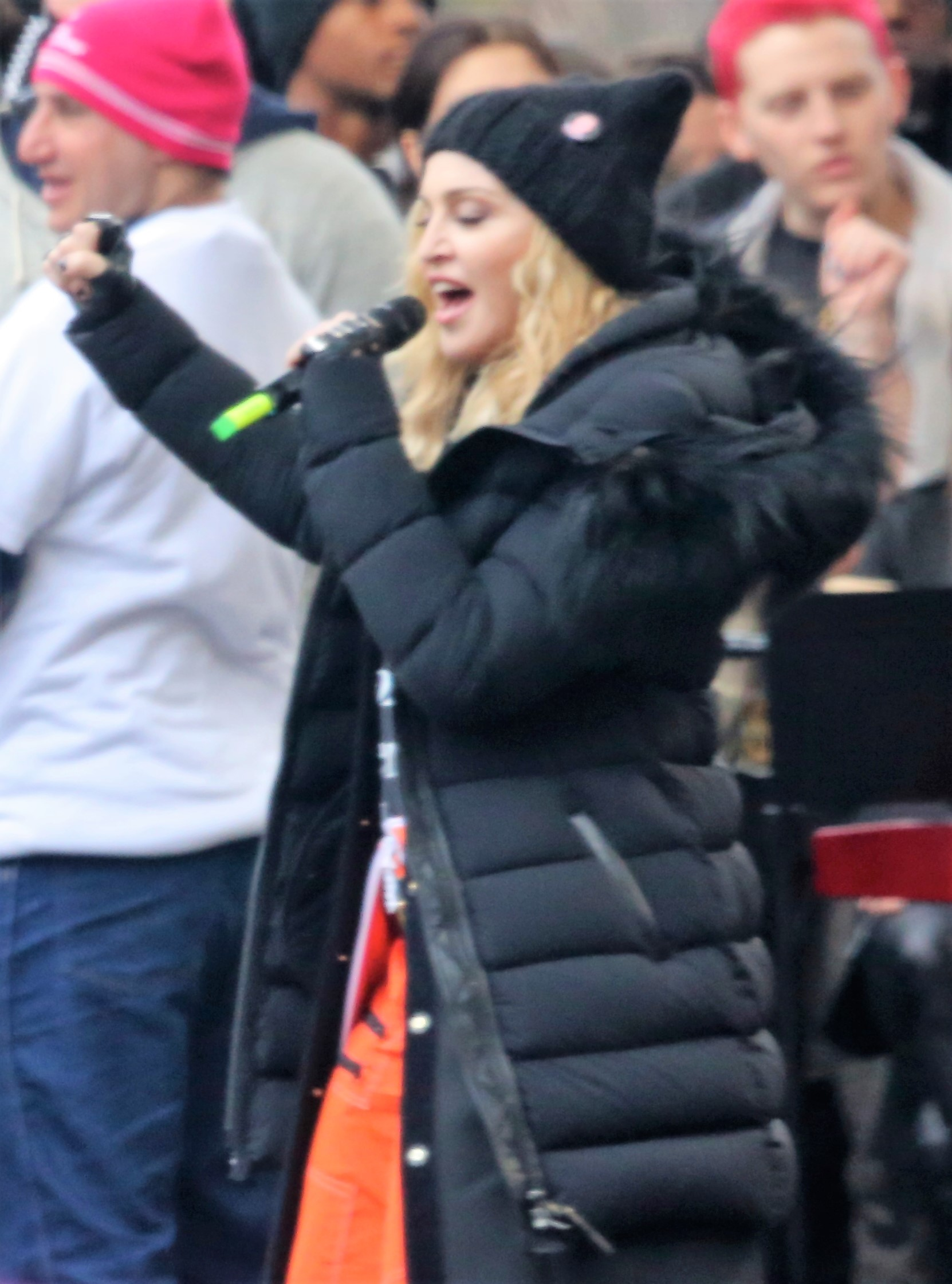
Madonna at 2017 Women's March

American singer-songwriter Madonna is seen by some as a feminist icon. Having been influenced with the image of the virgin and whore in her religious upbringing, Madonna's forays into feminism, womanhood and media representation of women sparked discussions among numerous feminist scholars and commentators worldwide. She has also been noted for her advocacy of women's rights.

Madonna's feminist reception proved to be vast, while she became a polarizing figure. Scholars such as Karlene Faith, Sarah Churchwell and Mary Cross have remarked on the polarization of Madonna, while also noting that it is not only of her, but that feminism itself is divided by many waves, agendas and ideologies. These cultural analyses and commentary also defined both her ambiguous impact and public perceptions on Madonna; Lucy O'Brien referred to her as a "complex feminist heroine".

The advent of Madonna was viewed by a number of scholars as a boost for feminism in music for different measurements. Scholar feminist Camille Paglia believes she "changed" the face of feminism back in the 1990s. During the peak of Madonna's career, the media also considered her a role model for other women; Strawberry Saroyan have seen it as "one of the most relevant aspects" of her legacy, while in Girl Heroes (2002), author claimed that her influence "ushered" in contemporary girl culture the representation of female popstar as "virtual teacher, mentor and role model". She was also criticized in equal or greater measurement, with French critic Georges-Claude Guilbert commenting the amount of reproaches that she gets was proportional to her status.

== Scope of reception ==
Reams have been written about the meaning of Madonna for women and for feminism

— British professor Stephen J. Hunt (2017)

Madonna has received academic attention, and this include areas of feminism. Canadian pundit Mark Steyn noted how she once had "her feminist significance pondered by college courses". The feminist attention Madonna has commanded has been vast. Mary Cross stated that "Madonna has inspired reams of feminist commentary", while Canadian professor Michael Real from Royal Roads University similarly argued that "many feminists have written extensively of Madonna". An author explained that gender play has been central to Madonna's work, which has evoked "a lot of commentary by feminist academics and journalists".

After the height of her feminist reception, a continual interest has been addressed. Authors in Future Texts (2015) explained that "Madonna remains a center of debate and contestation in the postfeminist era". Abigail Gardner from University of Gloucestershire, states in Rock On (2016), that Madonna perhaps holds a privileged place in the studies of feminism than any other pop star. Scholars in Ageing, Popular Culture and Contemporary Feminism (2014), made similar claims determining from the other celebrities reviewed that Madonna is "easily the most overdetermined figure in the interest of feminist scholars working in the field of popular culture studies". Feminist Review Collective in Contesting Feminist Orthodoxies (1996), made the comparison between Oprah Winfrey and Madonna, saying that in contrast to Winfrey, Madonna's life and cultural appeal have been minutely examined within a broad-ranging set of critical and feminist discourses. Simon Fraser University's Samantha C. Thrift wrote for Third Space (2003), her "body of criticisms" opened avenues for feminist analysis for Martha Stewart.

== Categorizing Madonna within feminism ==
Feminists, given the diversity of our social, political, and personal identities and agendas, have mixed views in appraising Madonna's value or harm to women.

— Canadian professor Karlene Faith explaining divisive feminists views on Madonna (1997).

The figure of Madonna has been discussed from various feminism theories and waves, dividing opinions. The feminist debate surrounding her, especially from American feminists during the 1990s, was visible for many, described by Czech writer Libuše Moníková as "not so superfluous". Academic Pamela Robertson in Guilty Pleasures (1996), commented: "[...] in academia, feminists query whether Madonna represents parody or pastiche, a healthy break from essentialism or a rejection of traditional feminist concerns". She further noted the attention comparing rather than ask "Can pop culture be critical of society?" or "What is the meaning of feminism today?" cultural critics ask "Is Madonna a glamorized fuckdoll or the queen of parodic critique?".

The divisive perceptions was also exemplified by French scholar Georges-Claude Guilbert citing the conference "Madonna: Feminist Icon or Material" at University of California, Santa Barbara organized by the Women's Center, which led Guilbert to conclude that it shows that question is not easy to decide, as some feminists left the conference declaring that they hadn't been able to make up their minds. In 2012, Spanish cultural critic Víctor Lenore convened a researchers panel discussion her as a feminist icon, showing mixed feelings. Some contextualized broadest views; "not everyone agrees that [Madonna] is feminist or empowering" but not least because not everyone agrees what it means to be feminist or empowering, wrote professor Sarah Churchwell for The Guardian in 2018. In 2007, professor and author Mary Cross similarly stated, "feminism itself is divided, not only about Madonna but about what feminism represents".

=== Positive ===
According to Sara Mills, some feminists have been "highly appreciative" of her work. An author believes she was better received by non-Lacanian feminists, a group that greatly valued disruptions of unity and "therefore greatly value Madonna". In Encyclopedia of Women in Today's World (2011), editors explained that in the wake of second-wave feminism, Madonna "achieved great critical and commercial success by carving out a niche for the sexually empowered and entrepreneurial female popstar". On the contrary, Elissa Strauss from The Forward describes that for second-wavers, Madonna is "all wrong" but for the third-wave "Madonna is a revolutionary pop star who taught us that we could be sexy and strong". In Looking West? (2002), Hilary Pilkington considered her a model of New feminism.

According to Robertson, some feminists appreciated Madonna for reasons that included self-empowerment or independence in both economic sphere and authorship. In 1990, Camille Paglia famously called Madonna a "true feminist" labeling her as "the future of feminism". Retrospectively, Paglia maintained her view in 2003, and further declared in 2017, that "it happened".

=== Negative and mixed ===
Whether Madonna is good for feminism (or whether she is a feminist) obscures the discussion

— E. Deidre Pribram

According to Cross, some "feminists have taken Madonna severely to task". Guilbert also noted how other feminists "have been outrageously negative about Madonna". Robertson explained that many criticized Madonna because she challenged "feminism's unified concept of 'woman'", while other complained her "antics" damaged women's movement. As early as 1988, Stephanie Brush from The New York Times noted how she was cast as "feminist's nightmare since the beginning".

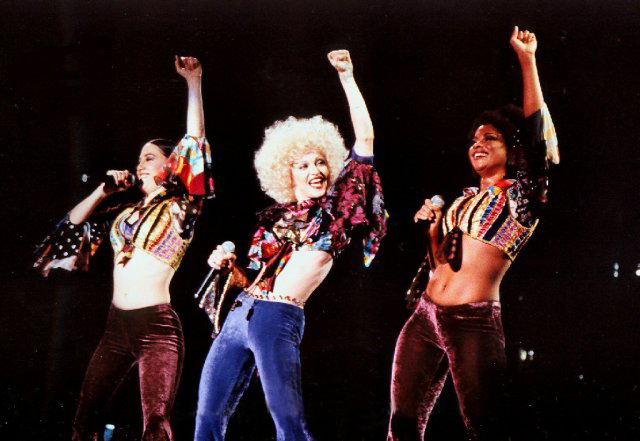
Madonna (center) with her backing vocalists/dancers Donna De Lory (left) and Niki Haris (right) during 1993's Girlie Show. In this decade, feminist writer bell hooks focused much of her criticisms towards her within racial perspectives.

In Feminist Phoenix: The Rise and Fall of a Feminist Counterculture (1999), authors argued that many of earliest Madonna's feminist critics came from a "generational issue" because she left most older feminists, illustrating a major problem of countercultural change. They claimed that Madonna depressed these feminists in the same way that flappers of the Jazz Age depressed suffragists. Jacqueline Edmondson, in Music in American Life (2013) made a similar observation by saying, that some saw Madonna "as an agent against the gains women had made during the feminist movements of the 1960s and 1970s". Furthermore, Guilbert said that Madonna's feminist critics, such as Rosemary Hennessy and Sheila Jeffreys before being public critics of Madonna, were "enemies" of the postmodern, as "the cultural capital of the late patriarchy".

Also, Texas A&M University's Carmela J. Garritano considered that her feminism is "for sale" and the celebration of her feminist image entails celebration of commercial success that has enabled it. In early 1990s, some scholars compiled surveys from college students and newspapers about Madonna, concluding she was deemed as "the lowest and/or most dangerous form of the feminine" and as "the antithesis of feminism". As early as 1985, an editor described "Madonna's whole image, in fact, is like a finger-flip to feminists". Up to early 1990s, it was noted that in popular press, there was a tendency to "construct a unified position for feminism against Madonna". On the other hand, in 2020, Griffith University's Rosemary Pringle concludes after reviewing criticisms from bell hooks that Madonna's status as a feminist heroine makes sense only from the perspective of a white woman, which led her to further conclude her status depended on a cultural and racial context, at least in the United States.

=== Other views ===
Zoe Lewis, a contributor from The Times, added the phrase "Madonna syndrome" to her description that "women are often the worst enemies of feminism because of our genetic make-up". In Lonette Stonisch's view, feminists believe that the "traditional feminists persistently misread Madonna, either because they feel threatened by her victories, or because they wish she'd keep her clothes on, or because they want a more serious examination and resolution of feminine objectification". At some stage of her career, some considered agents from lesbian feminism "responsible" for the fact that Madonna "remains misunderstood in certain quarters".

Some feminists, Guilbert said, "vigorously" reviewed Madonna but "they don't really choose sides". He cited Yvonne Tasker and Mary Joe Frug. Even Frug, was "afraid" that the work of Madonna might be misinterpreted; saying she herself believes in some Madonna's feminists declarations stating: "There probably a number of people who won't. Anyone who looks as much as sex worker as she does couldn't possibly be in charge of herself, they are likely to say".

Madonna further polarized views as her career continued as an aged woman. In a famous citation, Piers Morgan blasted Madonna's version of feminism. The editors of Ageing Women in Literature and Visual Culture (2017) decry that as Morgan proclaimed himself an "ardent feminist", they describe "it seems feminism is acceptable only at the expense of the exclusion of ageing women", they concluded. Niamh Middleton from Feminist Studies in Religion criticized Morgan, and his article entitled "Falling off the stage, Madonna, is God's way of telling you you're too old to cavort like a hooker" as a result of her falling stage in the Brit Awards 2015.

On the other hand, Madonna once stated about her feminist reception: "There is these days, a whole polemic among feminists, and some of them believe I have set the women's movement backward. Others, on the contrary, claim that I have helped its progress. I myself think that intelligent women don't see me as a threat". Ann Brooks, pointed out in Postfeminisms: Feminism, Cultural Theory and Cultural Forms (2002) that Madonna's defense against some of the charges made by feminists about her work is to assert "authorial intentionality" and "unified identity".

== Impact of Madonna's feminism ==
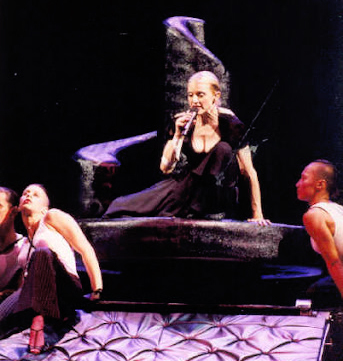
Madonna performing "Lo Que Siente la Mujer", the Spanish version of "What It Feels Like for a Girl", on 2001's Drowned World Tour

Professor Sut Jhally has referred to Madonna as "an almost sacred feminist icon". However, Filipino website Preen, says "she's an icon for sure, albeit a controversial one", further saying not everyone might feel comfortable with Madonna being regarded as a feminism icon. Authors of Encyclopedia of Women in American History (2015), including American historian Joyce Appleby and Neva Goodwin, noted how Madonna was "called both the ultimate feminist and the ultimate tramp".

The advent of Madonna attained a considerable estimation by various scholars. One of them credited Madonna to popularize "feminist politics". As early as 1990, Caryn James considered her the "woman who most astutely embodies how feminism has shifted in the last decade" (1980s). Sociologist Ellis Cashmore commented the term "postfeminism" wasn't invented for her, "but it could have been". Semiotician Marcel Danesi believes she "changed radically" the feminism, and inspired the movement of post-feminism at some extent. In Girl Heroes (2002), Susan Hopkins named her the "undisputed Queen of Popular Postfeminism". Michael Sweeney, professor of philosophy at Xavier University wrote in Justice Through Diversity?: A Philosophical and Theological Debate (2016) that Madonna "personified a peculiar form of feminism emerged in the late 1980s". Commentator Gil Troy called it "Madonna feminism", further adding that in an era "worshiping power", other pop stars represented a popular form of girl power or "Madonna feminism". Alisa Solomon used the phrase "the age of Madonna".

In a 2003 article from Bust, Camille Paglia said "the ultimate person to thank is Madonna. She changed the face of feminism, exactly as I had prophesied" (referring to her 1990 article in The New York Times when labelled Madonna as "the future of feminism"). In 2017, she also stated "it happened". Jennifer Baumgardner in a review of book Madonna and Me: Women Writers on the Queen of Pop (2012) declared: "[...] our Madonna gave birth to femme-inism". Writing for The Forward in 2012, Elissa Strauss discussed how Madonna defined the third-wave feminism.

=== In music and entertainment industries ===
Since the 1980s many commercial mainstream female artists have followed in Madonna's footsteps, in engaging with the self-policing, narcissistic gaze [...] These practices are a response to patriarchal culture [...] This also has the effect of pushing the boundaries of conservative (respectable) femininity.

— Information Resources Management Association (2022).

Some feminists have praised Madonna for "opening new doors" for women in the entertainment business. Her feminism have been attributed with influencing other artists, with Australian magazine The Music claiming that "Madonna's corporeal feminism impacted on female rappers". For one scholar, Madonna epitomizes a "whole generation of artists" who have (sometimes unconsciously) become pillars of the "third wave".

British entertainment critic Stuart Maconie commented that some would say she "brought feminism to the forefront of pop". British media scholar David Gauntlett is of the opinion that Madonna boosted feminism in music; in his explanation, he argued that feminist message were not often a key to success in the mainstream pop charts before Madonna, although there were many exceptions (like Janis Joplin or Aretha Franklin) but without a specific "feminist agenda" like her. He also concludes: "Madonna was the first person to remix her own populist version of feminism and make it part of a pop music success story". British professor Stephen J. Hunt, citing Madonna's influence in approaching different representations of feminism in her work (such as irony, parody or sexuality), pointed out that "today this ambiguity is a common theme in feminist analyses of women's music". In Multidisciplinary Perspectives on Women, Voice, and Agency (2020), scholars Berrin Yanıkkaya and Angelique Nairn, concluded that "Madonna music has now become synonymous with the performative nature of female pop music artists and their link with popular feminism".

Others considered her a precursor within feminist movements that influenced music industry. In Girl Heroes, Hopkins called her the "Godmother of Girl Power", while Gauntlett also remarked it at the same time recognized the importance of the Spice Girls within the slogan. Gauntlett also noted the idealized independent woman before the Destiny's Child with her self-empowerment. Critic Sally Banes also deemed Madonna a precursor of the Riot grrrl movement.

== Madonna on women's roles / stereotypes ==
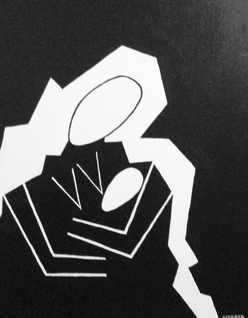
A painting representing Madonna's motherhood with her daughter Lourdes (2012). Her motherhood also attracted commentaries.

Madonna has played with various female archetypes, with Robert C Sickels writing in 100 Entertainers Who Changed America (2013), that "her career has always been, justifiably or not, understood through the lens of her womanhood". Author Cara Hagan in Practicing Yoga as Resistance (2021) described that "she has embodied various definitions of femininity over her more than 40-year career", while The Daily Telegraph staffers add she has been a virgin, whore, wife, mother, witch, diva, saint or sinner. In Pun(k) Deconstruction: Experifigural Writings in Art&art Education (2018), Jan Jagodzinski felt that both Marilyn Monroe and Madonna "mark the gap between modernism and postmodernism", in which Monroe was portrayed to please Hollywood in her time, controlled by men, while Madonna "uses the media to her own advantage". On the other hand, her motherhood also reignited discussions; in American Icons (2006), Diane Pecknold noted how she "became a highly contested symbol of motherhood".

=== Discussions and concerns ===
Sickels described "her portrayal of women is complex and often contradictory". Two scholars explored how Madonna "critiques and challenges widespread beliefs while at the same time reinforcing some of them". In the 1990s, commentators such as Lorraine Gamman and Margaret Marshment along with other cultural studies analysts, examined her as "the epitome of the contractions concerning femininity" presented in the media. During this decade, professor Suzanna Danuta Walters considered the figure of Madonna "emblematic" of the "confused way women are represented in popular culture".

Critic Stephen Holden commented for The New York Times in 1990, that she manipulated the persona of good-bad girl in music videos, concerts and "endless photographs" in a way that made her self-invention a "kind of ongoing performance". In New Book of Rock Lists (1994), music critic Dave Marsh reacted positively, stating "more than any other artist, [she] deconstructed the roles that women play, not only in music but in all of popular culture". In 2010, Süddeutsche Zeitung's editor Caroline von Lowtzow, compared how she linked patterns that were seen largely "incompatible", while Vicki Karaminas and Adam Geczy similarly agree she achieved "iconic status", labeling her as the "first woman [...] wich [such] mainstream panache and approbation".

==== Madonna's responses or authors interpretations ====
Harvard University's Lynne Layton noted Madonna has many different versions of femininity and "seems comfortable with all of them". Similarly, in Alison Piepmeier and Rory Dicker's book Catching a Wave: Reclaiming Feminism for the 21st Century (2016), Madonna is defined as a woman that "has made it clear that being female is just beginning of the many things women are" and is "fully aware of the ways in which women are made 'other'". In Encyclopedia of Women in American History (2015), Joyce Appleby and Neva Goodwin noted how she "staunchly defends her portrayal of women", quoting her as saying she's just doing what she wants which is also cited as a representation of gender equality.

==== Further criticisms ====
According to critics, Madonna corrupts the meaning of womanhood. Writing for The Guardian in 2010, Charlotte Raven headlined how "the 'new feminism' went wrong", where discussed her figure, saying "Madonna-ised woman sees everything, and everyone, as a means to her end". British writer John Farman called her a "ridiculous caricature of the modern woman". American feminist author Naomi Wolf noted how she has "infuriated" mainstream commentators which led her to describe in their critic's feeling, "she must be punished, for the same reason that every woman who steps out of line must be punished". However, an individual also commented is not so "untypical position" for a woman, explaining:

She's much loved or much hated, a not untypical position for a woman to occupy in patriarchy, whose inability to understand women in feminine terms is evidenced by the way it polarizes femininity into the opposing concepts of virgin-angel and whore-devil.

==== Other views ====
In Introducing Postmodernism: A Graphic Guide (2014), authors Richard Appignanesi and Chris Garratt explained that for some, "Madonna is the cyber-model of the 'New Woman'". Indeed, poet Karen Finley once averred in the 20th century, that "all women should be as Madonna as possible". In early 2000s, publisher Michael O'Mara told Reuters on Madonna: "One of the most enigmatic and fascinating women of our time, Madonna is the undisputed female icon of the modern age".

In 2012, Wolf considered Madonna "is doing wonders for the collective female psyche". In mid-2000s, academics Allyson Jule and Bettina Tate Pedersen considered she seemed "relevant" to millennial womanhood, as she embodied qualities that spoke to a more modern and feminist sensibility. When she was included in The Guardian list of Top 100 Women in 2011, they said "she inspires not because she gives other women a helping hand, but because she breaks the boundaries of what's considered acceptable for women".

Some analysts felt her forays into women's roles crossed boundaries; critic Ty Burr commented that Madonna "engaged audiences in the debate over how we prefer women to behave in pop culture". In contrast to denominational religions, which assign "only" one role to womanhood, that of wife and mother, as Marcel Danesi claims, Madonna "has made it clear that pop culture can provide an equilibrium". Sickels believes her "social, cultural and political representations of female are perhaps Madonna's most long-lasting legacy". In 2007, Joseph A. Kotarba, a sociology professor at the University of Houston, stated she has helped "define what it means to be a woman in our late capitalistic culture".

== Role model ==
Madonna's enduring success as a mediated feminine icon also ushered in another key theme of contemporary girl culture representation of the female popstar as a virtual teacher, mentor and role model

— Girl Heroes (2002)

Across different decades, Madonna was cited as a role model by media for other women for different public perceptions, with Ken McLeod from University of Toronto writing in We are the Champions (2013), "her music and videos have influenced countless young women" for the past three decades. Professor Santiago Fouz-Hernandez wrote in Madonna's Drowned Worlds (2004) that in her early career, she "emerged as a role model for women in many different cultures, symbolizing professional and personal independence in a male-dominated society, as well as sexual liberation". Guilbert also notes how Madonna once considered and stated: "I'd rather feel women out there in the world can draw strength from what I've accomplished in my life than have other pop stars acknowledge their debt". In the description of American author Strawberry Saroyan, along with her ability to take her message beyond music, Madonna's "impact women's lives has been her legacy".

=== 1980s—2020s ===
After the rise of Madonna, the whole notion of a butch kind of women's liberation became antiquated. The new feminine role model was someone who could be fully aware of her sexual prowess, while at the same time being selective and also in control.

— Sonic Cool (2002), exploring perceptions during Madonna's heydays.

During her prime, Rene Denfeld explained she was "far more popular among young women", than "any feminist activist". In 1990, Caryn James called her "the most influential feminist of the day". Writing for The New York Times in 2019, Vanessa Grigoriadis also commented in retrospect that she "became the dominant model of femininity across the nation". Jana Wendt cited an early Paglia's statement as saying: "What she did was to change a whole generation of younger women, and that's what changed feminism". In Fame Attack (2012), Chris Rojek defined that generation of women influenced by Madonna as the "New Woman". In 2015, Christina Broussard from Portland Mercury said that when Madonna emerged decades ago, it was about more than the look she personified. It was about the message. Broussard explained that for a female pop star to have an overarching political statement was something of a rarity in the Reagan era. In 1994, BBC Worldwide called Madonna and Margaret Thatcher "powerful role models for modern women".

After her heydays, her path continued to be recognized by various. When she entered into her 50s, The Associated Press dedicated an article discussing her as a role model for women plus-50. In a op-ed for PerthNow in 2023, Sarah Vine said she continued to be an icon of freedom, and for that many other women, including herself, "have huge respect for her". Jennifer Oliver O'Connell, wrote in Women in American History (2017), that "Madonna remains an important model of female independence and rebellion", with an "insistence" on maintaining control of her own projects that "stands in great contrast to earlier female recording artists". Appleby and Goodwin also noted she embodied "women's freedom".

=== Reproval and ambiguities ===
Conversely, some criticized those academics that remarked Madonna's status as role model for young women in her heydays, including professor Sheila Jeffreys. Ruth Conniff, declared "we can do better than this" in our "post-feminist age", further describing "we need a better role model than Madonna. We need a sense that we can do something more productive for society". Also, Audra Gaugler in her thesis for Lehigh University in 2000, said that as she "took more risks in her work", women who at first praised her became her most vocal critics. For Guilbert, in early 2000s, the "amount of reproaches that Madonna gets" was "proportional to her popularity".

Brian Beacom, from The Herald questioned broadsheet journals when many celebrated her 60-years old birthday in 2018, and championed her as a role model for women, both in her heydays and present. He said, she's not a "game changer". In the 2010s, editor Erin Harde explained that she has never viewed Madonna as a role model, but rethink her as a possibly "feminist voice" after a discussion with scholar Roxanne Harde.

=== Commentaries by industry female fellows ===
Some entertainers have shared also opinions. Lady Gaga commented and considered her a "role model" for girls after Madonna's speech dealing with her condition as a woman in music industry during 2016's Billboard Women in Music. In 2022, actress Anne Hathaway, stated: "Madonna impacted all of us. She changed what it meant to be a woman in culture. So Madonna absolutely has had a huge influence on me just because she's had a huge influence on all women".

Conversely, Carly Simon stated around early 1990s, that she doesn't think of Madonna as a good role model, saying she is a "changing persona", explaining her point that Madonna "is not quite so successful because she's telling women you can't be who you are". Joni Mitchell considered her like a "living Barbie doll but a little bit on the blue side. There's always been that type of female. There's always been a market for it, but the danger is that she thinks she's a role model. And it's a terrible role model. It's death to all things real". In early 1990s, Sinéad O'Connor considered her as "probably the hugest model for women in America", but recalled her double-standard after quoting Madonna's commentaries about O'Connor's look.

=== Depictions ===
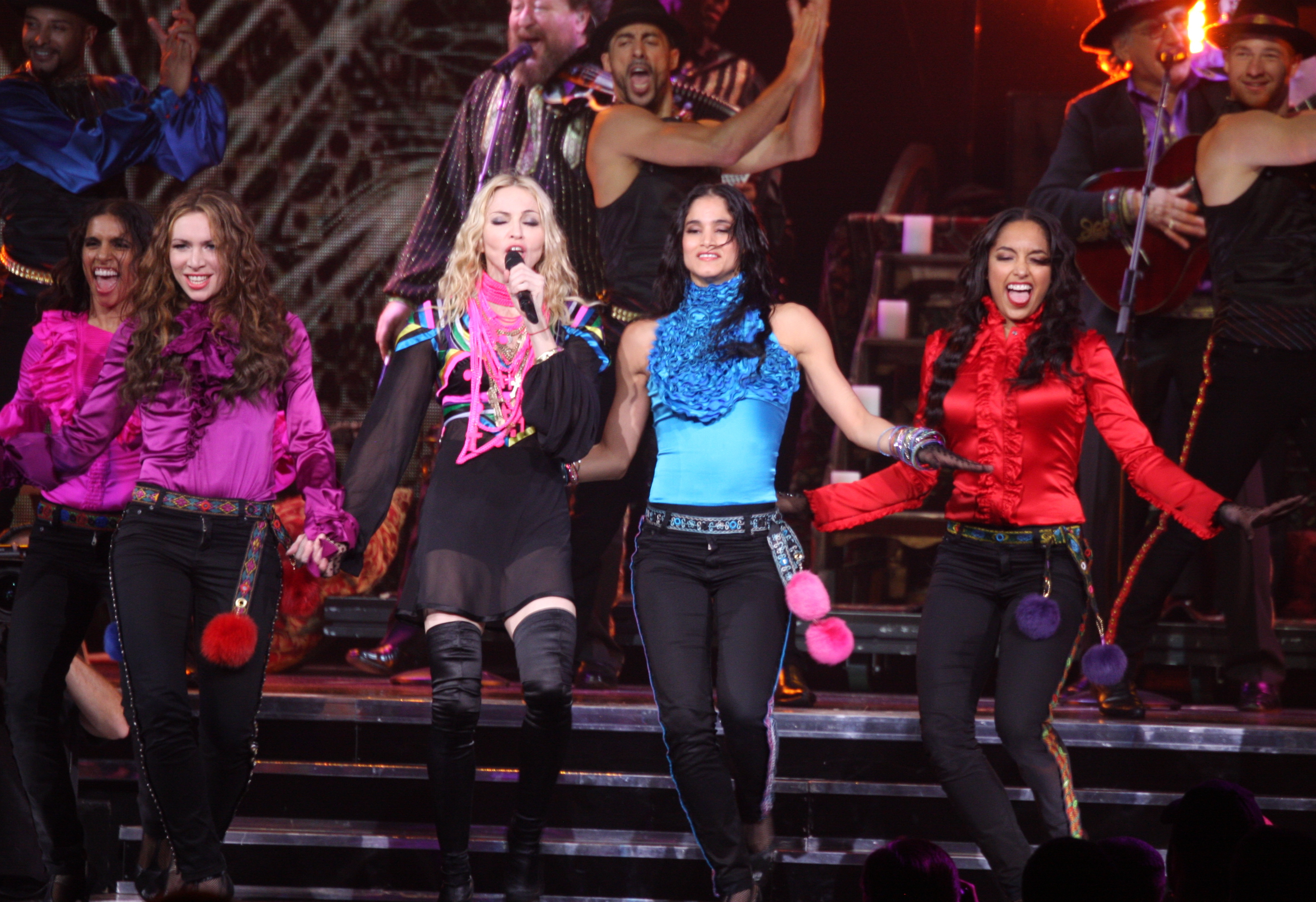
Madonna during her Sticky & Sweet Tour (2008) with her female dancers. Women's feelings toward Madonna have seen devoted journalistic articles and books.

Journalist pieces have devoted the topic of Madonna as role model, including one from Washington Post issued on 1990, while others focused on women feelings towards Madonna, including an article by The Guardian in 2023 from six generations of women. Other books about Madonna similarly focused on women's feelings towards the singer; its include I Dream of Madonna: Women's Dreams of the Goddess of Pop (1993) by Kay Turner, and Madonna and Me: Women Writers On The Queen Of Pop (2012) by Laura Barcella and Jessica Valenti. Turner's work has been cited by authors such as Lucy Goodison and Alice Robb, with Robb describing some of these woman interviewed by Turner, found "emotional support in their Madonna dreams, waking with a sense of peace of resolution that persisted in their real lives". India Knight's novel My Life on a Plate (2000), have a heroine that models herself on Madonna, with the aspects of modern woman.

== Activism and referential works ==
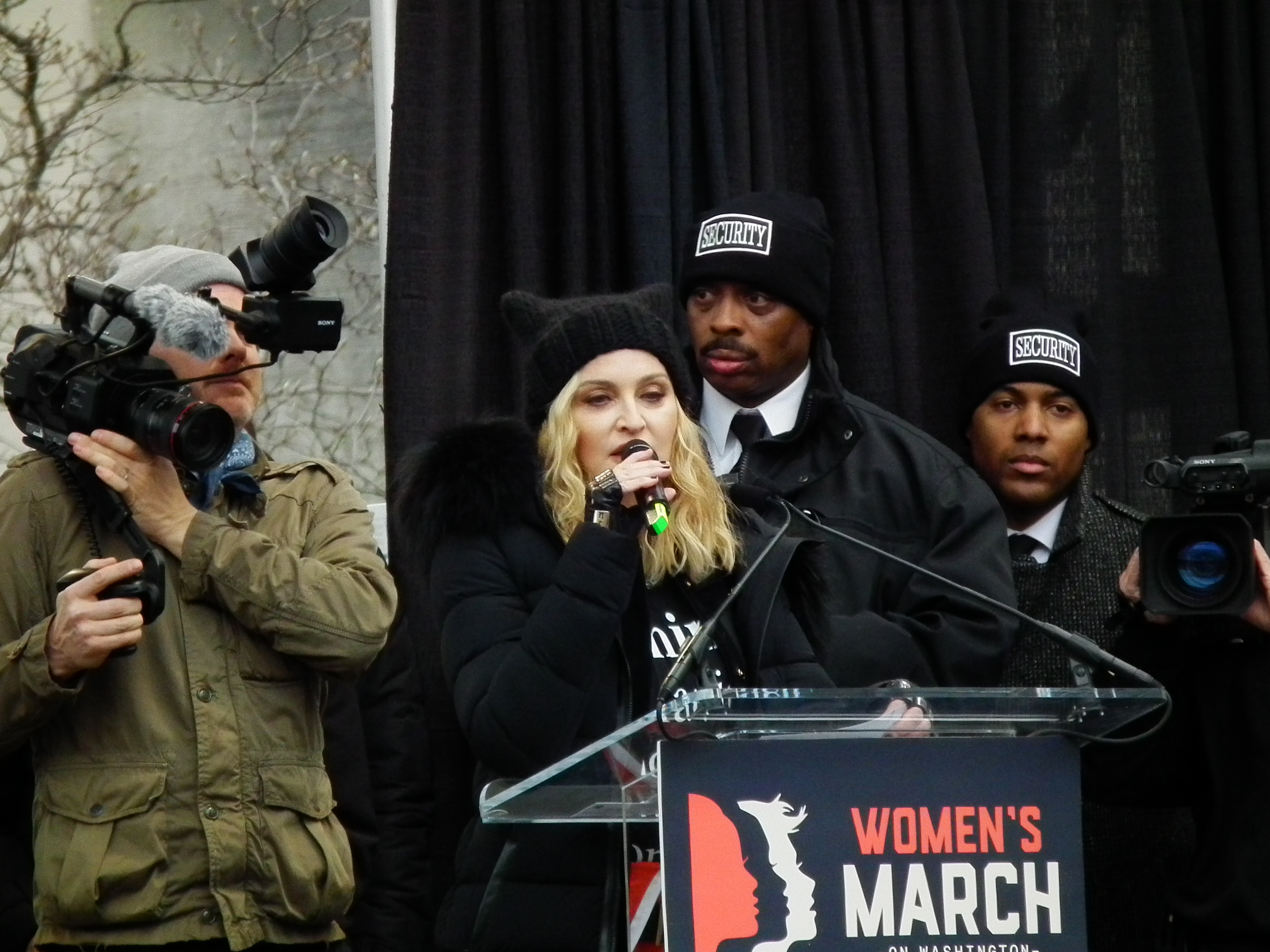
Madonna at 2017 Women's March

Madonna herself has had updated views on feminism. Jagodzinski noted the ambiguity of Madonna's stance as a feminist. She was quoted as saying at some stage: "I'm not a feminist, I'm a humanist". She later felt and stated: "I may be dressing like the traditional bimbo, whatever, but I'm in charge, and isn't that what feminism is all about". In 2016, after receiving the Billboard Women of the Year, Madonna touched on sexism and misogyny, and the criticisms she faced, concluding: "'Oh, if you're a feminist, you don't have sexuality, you deny it', so I said 'fuck it. I'm a different kind of feminist. I'm a bad feminist'". In 2018, Churchwell claimed she "remains the hero of her own story, rejecting the pieties of certain versions of feminism and insisting that no one else defines her". Similarly, Mary Gabriel considered Madonna has worked to stake a claim to her "own kind of feminism". Despite her updated views, American philosopher Susan Bordo felt and once commented she has not "advertised herself as disdainful of feminism".

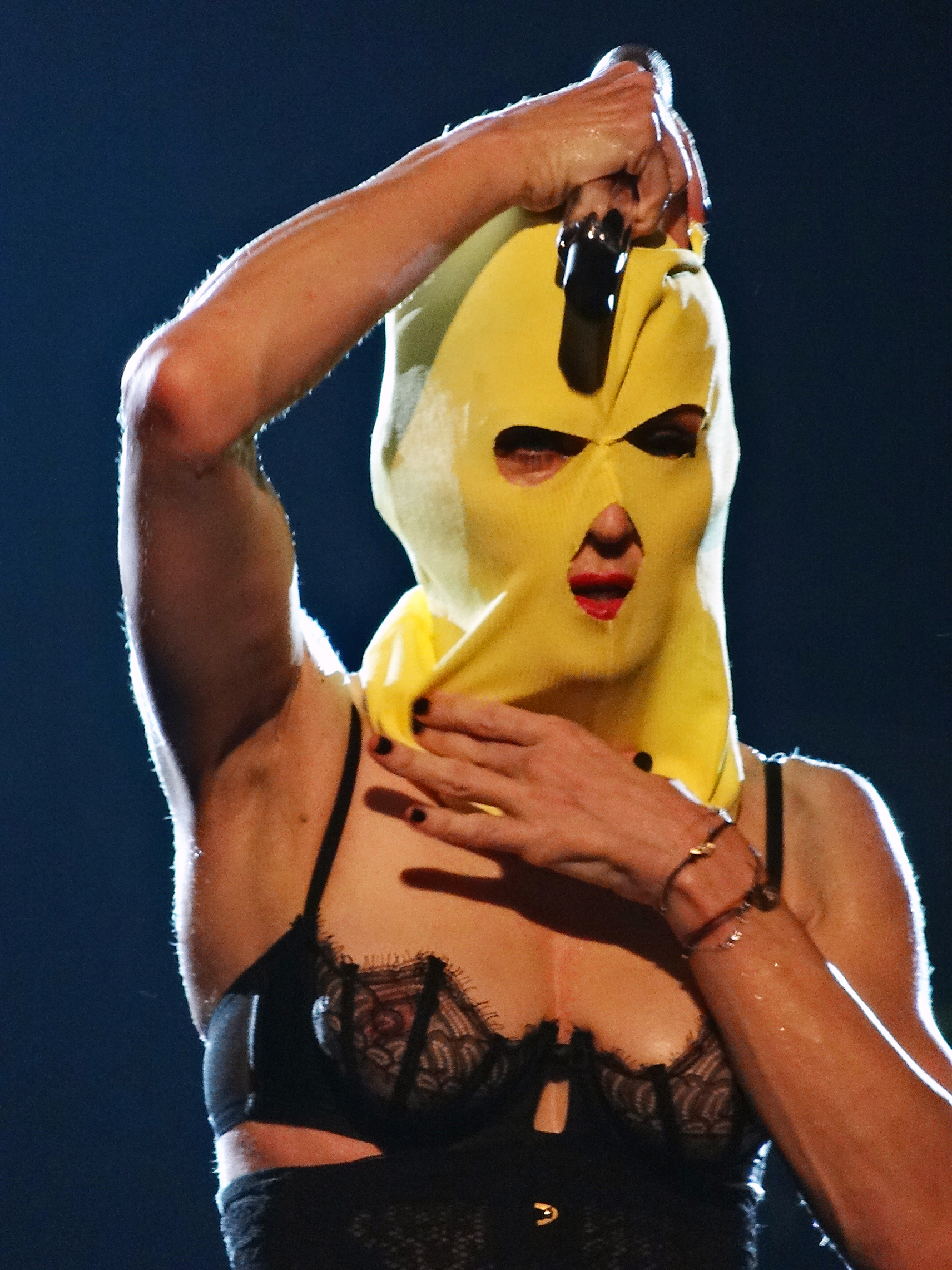
Madonna expressing her support to Russian feminist performance group, Pussy riot during The MDNA Tour in 2012

Others have noted Madonna's forays into women's rights. Author James Dickerson in Women on Top (1998), considered her a "true pioneer [...] in the arena of women's rights". J. Randy Taraborrelli once stated and felt Madonna has a "strong responsibility" to feminism because she has been beacon for it for most of her life. In early 1990s, Paglia felt the singer condoned the "degradation" and "humiliation" of women. In 1990, Michael MacCambridge from Cox News Service said that her greatest "cultural contribution" might came from her updated view of feminism: "The degree to which she's helped bury the women-are-smart-or-pretty stereotype". Joyce Appleby and Neva Goodwin also noted how she "has outspoken on behalf of women's right and unafraid to speak her mind on and off stage". However, others criticized her, including Australian feminist Melinda Tankard Reist in 2016, saying "she has turned her back on the cause of women". In 2023, while reviewing Madonna's biography by Mary Gabriel, Suzanne Moore noted how she performed in Turkey, a country "where women's rights are being stamped on". The same year, Lucy O'Brien referred to her as a "complex feminist heroine who can be awkward in her communications".

In 2017, during A Year of Yes: Reimagining Feminism at the Brooklyn Museum, Madonna took the stage wearing a shirt with "feminist" (all caps) emblazoned on the front and at one point in her conversation with Marilyn Minter, she vowed to "personally slap" any man in the room that did not identify as a feminist. The same year, commemorating the International Women's Day, she released a 12-minute short film called Her Story and which was dedicated "to all women that fight for freedom" and highlighted the fight for gender equality. The short clip ends with two figures carrying a banner that reads "we should all be feminists". Also, during that year Madonna was one of dozens of celebrities who attended the Women's March in Washington D.C. She sung "Express Yourself" and "Human Nature". In 2018, Madonna proclaimed her solidarity with the Ele Não movement in Brazil, and a year later, in 2019, she talked about the MeToo movement.

== All-female lists ==
Madonna has been included in listicles focused on women. In 2011, William Langley from The Daily Telegraph noted how she has been a fixture of several "list of world's most powerful/admired/influential women". In 2021, Time included her in their rank of "100 Women of the Year", representing 100 years of women's history, where Madonna was seen as a representation of the year 1989. She featured on Women in the World's list of 50 Most Popular Women in the World the same year. She was also awarded in her industry; Madonna won the inaugural Women of the Year by Glamour in 1990, and received the Women of the Year at Billboard Women in Music of 2016.

Recognizing women in history/periods or feminists (Note: Listicle limited to only ten publications.)
Year	Publication	List or Work	Ref.
1997	Adams Media	365 Women Who Made Difference	
1998	Ladies' Home Journal	100 Most Important Women of the 20th Century	
1998	Friedman/Fairfax Publishers	100 Remarkable Women of the 20th Century	
1999	ABC-Clio	Notable Women in American History (500 of the most notable women in American history)	
2010	Time	25 Most Powerful Women of the Past Century	
2011	The Guardian	Top 100 Women	
2016	Esquire	The 75 Greatest Women of All Time	
2018	Good Housekeeping	120 Women Who Changed Our World	
2019	Encyclopædia Britannica	100 Women	
2019	Zest Books	50 Feminists Who Changed the World	
2021	Glamour	Most Influential Feminist Musicians (of the past 60 years)	

== See also ==
- Cultural impact of Madonna

== Print sources ==
- Adamson, Lynda (1999). Notable Women in American History: A Guide to Recommended Biographies and Autobiographies. ABC-CLIO. ISBN 978-0-313-29584-3.
- Appleby, Joyce; Chang, Eileen; Goodwin, Neva (2015). Encyclopedia of Women in American History. Taylor & Francis. ISBN 978-1317471622.
- Appignanesi, Richard; Garratt, Chris (2014). Introducing Postmodernism: A Graphic Guide. Icon Books. ISBN 978-1-84831-760-4.
- Banes, Sally (2007). Before, Between, and Beyond: Three Decades of Dance Writing. University of Wisconsin Press. ISBN 978-0299221539.
- Barcella, Laura (2019). Fight Like a Girl: 50 Feminists Who Changed the World. Zest Books. ISBN 978-1541581838.
- Bordo, Susan (2004). Unbearable Weight: Feminism, Western Culture, and the Body. University of California Press. ISBN 0520930711.
- Burr, Ty (2012). Gods Like Us: On Movie Stardom and Modern Fame. Knopf Doubleday Publishing Group. ISBN 978-0307907424.
- Brooks, Ann (2002). Postfeminisms: Feminism, Cultural Theory and Cultural Forms. Routledge. ISBN 1134822332.
- Callahan, Vicki; Kuhn, Virginia (2015). Future Texts: Subversive Performance and Feminist Bodies. Parlor Press, LLC. ISBN 978-1602357709.
- Cross, Mary (2007). Madonna: A Biography. Greenwood Publishing Group. ISBN 978-0-313-33811-3.
- Danesi, Marcel (2012). Popular Culture: Introductory Perspectives. Rowman & Littlefield Publishers. ISBN 978-1442217843.
- Danesi, Marcel (2014). Dictionary of Media and Communications. Routledge. ISBN 978-1317473121.
- Denfeld, Rene (2009). The New Victorians: A Young Woman's Challenge to the Old Feminist Order. Hachette. ISBN 978-0446565233.
- Dicker, Rory; Piepmeier, Alison (2016). Catching a Wave: Reclaiming Feminism for the 21st Century. Northeastern University Press. ISBN 978-1555538569.
- Dickerson, James L. (1998). Women on Top: The Quiet Revolution That's Rocking the American Music Industry. Billboard Books. ISBN 0823084892.
- Edmonson, Catherine M. (1997). 365 Women Who Made a Difference. Adams Media. ISBN 1558506411.
- Edmondson, Jacqueline (2013). Music in American Life: An Encyclopedia of the Songs, Styles, Stars, and Stories that Shaped our Culture. ABC-CLIO. ISBN 978-0313393488.
- Faith, Karlene; Wasserlein, Frances (1997). Madonna, Bawdy & Soul. University of Toronto Press. ISBN 0-802-04208-2.
- Farman, John (2012). The Very Bloody History Of Britain, 2: The Last Bit!. Random House. ISBN 978-1448121076.
- Feminist Review Collective (1996). Contesting Feminist Orthodoxies. Psychology Press. ISBN 0415145635.
- Fouz-Hernández, Santiago; Jarman-Ivens, Freya (2004). Madonna's Drowned Worlds: New Approaches to her Cultural Transformations, 1983-2003. Routledge. ISBN 1351559540.
- Garde-Hansen, Joanne (2011). Media and Memory. Edinburgh University Press. ISBN 978-0748647071.
- Gardner, Abigail (2016). Jennings, Ros (ed.). 'Rock On': Women, Ageing and Popular Music. Taylor & Francis. ISBN 978-1317189091.
- Garritano, Carmela J. (2001). The Making of a Gendered Nation in Postcolonial West African Video, Film, and Literatures. Michigan State University.
- Golden, Kristen (1998). Remarkable Women of the Twentieth Century: 100 Portraits of Achievement. Friedman/Fairfax Publishers. ISBN 1567995993.
- Goodison, Lucy (1997). The Dreams of Women: Exploring and Interpreting Women's Dreams. Penguin Group. ISBN 042516120X.
- Glamour (2021). Glamour: 30 Years of Women Who Have Reshaped the World. Abrams Books. ISBN 978-1647002893.
- Guilbert, Georges-Claude (2015). Madonna as Postmodern Myth. McFarland. ISBN 978-0-786-48071-5.
- Hagan, Cara (2021). Practicing Yoga as Resistance. Taylor & Francis. ISBN 978-1000374919.
- Hall, Dennis; Hall, Susan G (2006). American Icons. Greenwood Publishing Group. ISBN 978-0-275-98431-1.
- Hanson, Richard H. (1996). Writing Successfully. Allyn and Bacon. ISBN 0205152775.
- Harrington, Joe S. (2002). Sonic Cool: The Life & Death of Rock 'n' Roll. Hal Leonard Corporation. ISBN 0634028618.
- Hopkins, Susan (2002). Girl Heroes: The New Force in Popular Culture. Pluto Press. ISBN 1-864-03157-3.
- Hunt, Stephen J. (2017). New Religions and Spiritualities. Taylor & Francis. ISBN 978-1351914710.
- Jankowsky, Karen; Love, Carla (1997). Other Germanies: Questioning Identity in Women's Literature and Art. SUNY Press. ISBN 0791434508.
- jagodzinski, jan (2018). Pun(k) Deconstruction: Experifigural Writings in Art&art Education. Taylor & Francis. ISBN 978-1135458294.
- Jeffreys, Sheila (2005). Beauty and Misogyny: Harmful Cultural Practices in the West. Routledge. ISBN 1134264437.
- Jhally, Sut (2006). The Spectacle of Accumulation: Essays in Culture, Media, And Politics. Peter Lang. ISBN 978-0-8204-7904-0.
- Jule, Allyson; Pedersen, Bettina Tate (2006). Being Feminist, Being Christian: Essays from Academia. Springer. ISBN 1403983100.
- Information Resources Management Association (2022). Research Anthology on Feminist Studies and Gender Perceptions. IGI Global. ISBN 978-1668445129.
- Karaminas, Vicki; Geczy, Adam (2013). Queer Style. A&C Black. ISBN 978-1-4725-3534-4.
- Lamphier, Peg A.; Welch, Rosanne (2017). Women in American History: A Social, Political, and Cultural Encyclopedia and Document Collection. ABC-CLIO. ISBN 978-1610696036.
- Maconie, Stuart (2013). The People's Songs: The Story of Modern Britain in 50 Records. Random House. ISBN 978-1-4090-3318-9.
- Marsh, Dave; Bernard, James (1994). New Book of Rock Lists. Simon and Schuster. ISBN 0671787004.
- McGlynn, Cathy; O'Neill, Margaret; Schrage-Früh, Michaela (2017). Ageing Women in Literature and Visual Culture: Reflections, Refractions, Reimaginings. Springer Publishing. ISBN 978-3319636092.
- McLeod, Dr Ken (2013). We are the Champions: The Politics of Sports and Popular Music: The Politics of Sports and Popular Music. Ashgate Publishing. ISBN 978-1409494508.
- Mills, Sara (1994). Gendering the Reader. Harvester Wheatsheaf. ISBN 0745011306.
- Pilkington, Hilary (2002). Looking West?: Cultural Globalization and Russian Youth Cultures. Penn State Press. ISBN 0271021861.
- Pringle, Rosemary (2020). Transitions: New Australian feminisms. Routledge. ISBN 978-1000248241.
- Prozan, Charlotte Krause (1993). The Technique of Feminist Psychoanalytic Psychotherapy. J. Aronson. ISBN 0876682689.
- Ratliff, Clancy Ann (2006). "Where are the Women?": Rhetoric and Gender in Weblog Discourse. University of Minnesota.
- Real, Michael R. (1996). Exploring media culture: A guide. SAGE Publishing. ISBN 0803958765.
- Robb, Alice Robb (2018). Why We Dream: The Science, Creativity and Transformative Power of Dreams. Pan Macmillan. ISBN 978-1509836253.
- Robertson, Pamela (1996). Guilty pleasures: Feminist camp from Mae West to Madonna. I.B. Tauris. ISBN 1860640877.
- Rodnitzky, Jerome L.; Rodnitzky, Jerry; Rodnitzky, Morton (1999). Feminist Phoenix: The Rise and Fall of a Feminist Counterculture. Greenwood Publishing Group. ISBN 0275965759.
- Rojek, Chris (2012). Fame Attack: The Inflation of Celebrity and Its Consequences. Bloomsbury Publishing. ISBN 978-1849668040.
- Schwichtenberg, Cathy (1993). The Madonna Connection. Westview Press. ISBN 0813313961.
- Sexton, Adam (1993). Desperately Seeking Madonna: In Search of The Meaning of the World's Most Famous Woman. ABC-CLIO. ISBN 0385306881.
- Sickels, Robert C. (2013). 100 Entertainers Who Changed America: An Encyclopedia of Pop Culture Luminaries. ABC-CLIO. ISBN 978-1598848311.
- Stange, Mary Zeiss; Oyster, Carol K.; Sloan, Jane E. (2011). Encyclopedia of Women in Today's World. Vol. 1. SAGE Publishing. ISBN 978-1-4129-7685-5.
- Steyn, Mark (2014). Broadway Babies Say Goodnight. Taylor & Francis. ISBN 978-1136685088.
- Sweeney, Michael J. (2016). Justice Through Diversity?: A Philosophical and Theological Debate. Rowman & Littlefield. ISBN 978-1442271173.
- Taraborrelli, J. Randy (2018). Madonna: An Intimate Biography of an Icon at Sixty. Pan Macmillan. ISBN 978-1509842797.
- Thore, Whitney Way (2016). I Do It with the Lights On. Random House Publishing Group. ISBN 978-0399594519.
- Troy, Gil (2013). Morning in America: How Ronald Reagan Invented the 1980's. Princeton University Press. ISBN 978-1400849307.
- Walters, Suzanna Danuta (1995b). Material Girls: Making Sense of Feminist Cultural Theory. University of California Press. ISBN 0520089782.
- Wearing, Betsy (1998). Leisure and Feminist Theory. SAGE. ISBN 0857026003.
- Wendt, Jana (2008). A Matter of Principle: New Meetings with the Good, the Great and the Formidable. Melbourne University Publishing. ISBN 978-0522855258.
- Whelehan, Imelda; Gwynne, Joel (2014). Ageing, Popular Culture and Contemporary Feminism. Palgrave Macmillan. ISBN 978-1-137-37653-4.
- Yanıkkaya, Berrin; Nairn, Angelique Margarita (2020). Multidisciplinary Perspectives on Women, Voice, and Agency. IGI Global. ISBN 978-1799848301.
