= Rebecca Hains =

Feminist media studies professor and author

Rebecca Hains is an American communication and media studies scholar and author. She is an associate professor in the Marketing and Decision Sciences Department at the Bertolon School of Business of Salem State University and focuses her work on the subject of children's media culture and marketing, which she studies from a feminist media studies and critical/cultural studies perspective. She was a 2023–2024 Fulbright scholar.

Her books include Growing Up with Girl Power: Girlhood on Screen and in Everyday Life (2012) and The Princess Problem: Guiding Our Girls through the Princess-Obsessed Years (2014), and she has edited three anthologies on children's culture.

== Education ==
Hains earned her B.A. in English from Emmanuel College, Boston, Massachusetts, in 1998 and her M.S. in mass communication from Boston University (2000). She holds a Ph.D. in mass media and communication from Temple University in Philadelphia, Pennsylvania (2007).

== Publications ==
Hains' 2012 book Growing Up with Girl Power: Girlhood on Screen and in Everyday Life presents a critical history of the girl power phenomenon. Combining textual analysis with field work among children and interviews with tween girls, the book considers girls' interpretations of girl power's messages about female empowerment, girlhood, strength, femininity, and race. Hains details strengths and limitations in commercialized girl power's handling of preadolescent body image, gender identity, sexism, and racism. Jessalynn Keller, in her review for Girlhood Studies, concludes that the book "is a necessary read for those interested in girls' studies, feminist media studies, feminist ethnography, and childhood studies".

Her 2014 book The Princess Problem: Guiding Our Girls through the Princess-Obsessed Years critiques princess culture's consumerism and its gender, race, and beauty stereotypes, with special attention to the Disney Princess franchise. The book combines original field research and secondary analysis of scholarly research on media and child development, interpreting these studies for a mainstream audience of parents. It also focuses on helping children develop critical thinking and critical viewing skills. The Princess Problem was the subject of significant media attention, including a double segment on The Meredith Vieira Show. Publishers Weekly's review states that the book dissects "princess marketing, reveals inherent gender stereotypes, [and] adds to the discussion with these practical parenting tips."

Hains has edited, with collaborators, six anthologies on children's culture:

- Princess Cultures: Mediating Girls' Imaginations and Identities (2013),
- Cultural Studies of LEGO: More Than Just Bricks (2019),
- The Marketing of Children's Toys: Critical Perspectives on Children's Consumer Culture (2021).
- Supernatural Youth in Media (2025)
- Barbie and Social Media: Digital Discourses and Mattel's Celebrity Doll (2025)
- Barbie in the Media: The Transmedia Presence of Mattel's Celebrity Doll (2025)

A review in the American Journal of Play comments that in Princess Cultures, "Forman-Brunell and Hains have created a rich collection of essays that significantly contribute to the growing literature that examines girls' popular cultures." An article in Marketing Theory cited two of her books and a journal article, praising Cultural Studies of Lego for highlighting "the importance of understanding gendered marketing to children to complement our understanding of children’s consumption and consumer culture". Hains has also written articles on media culture for publications such as The Washington Post, The Christian Science Monitor, and The Boston Globe.

== Media appearances and perspective ==
Conventional U.S. and international media frequently cite Hains as an academic expert on children's media culture. Her critical perspective on media representation of girls and women, as well as gender stereotypes on screen and in children's toys, have been reported on in major publications, news programs, and radio broadcasts. For example, her analyses of Barbie have been covered by The Washington Post, Fortune, Adweek, The New York Times, the Los Angeles Times and on SiriusXM, while her critiques of Disney Princess and princess culture have been reported on by the BBC, The Christian Science Monitor, Fortune, The Guardian, The Meredith Vieira Show, The New York Times, NPR's On Point, The Wall Street Journal, and CNN.

Media outlets reporting on gender-neutral toys and gendered toy marketing have included her expert commentary, such as CBC Radio's The Current, Fox and Friends, NPR's Morning Edition, Slate, and The Wall Street Journal. Hains spoke extensively about princess culture, girl power, and the history of girls and media in the 2014 ARTE France documentary Pink Attitude: Princesses, Pop Stars and Girl Power.

== Academia ==
Hains is an associate professor in the Marketing and Decision Sciences Department at the Bertolon School of Business of Salem State University in Salem, Massachusetts. She previously served as department chair of the Media and Communication Department and was a faculty fellow in diversity, equity and inclusion. Among her peer-reviewed journal articles, the most frequently cited is "Power feminism, mediated: Girl power and the commercial politics of change", published in Women's Studies in Communication, which informs scholars' research about feminism and power dynamics in the media. Oxford Bibliographies identifies two of Hains' other articles as significant contributions on advertising and promotion to children, three of her works (including her first two books) as significant contributions on "tweens – childhood studies", and her collection Princess Cultures as a significant contribution to "fairy tales and folk tales – childhood studies".

Hains was invited as a special guest to the White House Council on Women and Girls' Research Conference on Girls in 2014. She sits on the National Advisory Council of Media Literacy Now and the editorial board of the Journal of Children and Media. She was previously a board member of the Brave Girls Alliance, the International Communication Association, and the National Women's Studies Association. Hains received a 2023–2024 Fulbright award to teach at Jagiellonian University in Poland, where she also "explore[d] the global impact of American media internationally".
