= Heirs of the Bamboo =

2015 non-fiction book by Marisa C. Gaspar

Heirs of the Bamboo: Identity and Ambivalence among the Eurasian Macanese
- Author: Marisa C. Gaspar
- Translator: Roopanjali Roy
- Language: Portuguese
- Publisher: Instituto do Oriente, Berghahn Books
- Publication date: 2015
- English publication date: 2020
- Pages: 290
- ISBN: 978-9-896-46108-9

Heirs of the Bamboo: Identity and Ambivalence among the Eurasian Macanese (Portuguese: No Tempo do Bambu - Identidade e Ambivalência entre Macaenses) is a non-fiction book by Marisa C. Gaspar. It was originally published in Portuguese by Lisbon's Instituto do Oriente in 2015. An English translation by Roopanjali Roy was published in 2020 by Berghahn Books.
