= Vanished History: The Holocaust in Czech and Slovak Historical Culture =

2014 book by Tomas Sniegon

- First edition
- Author: Tomas Sniegon
- Publisher: Berghahn Books
- Publication date: 2014

Vanished History: The Holocaust in Czech and Slovak Historical Culture is a 2014 book by Czech academic Tomas Sniegon of Lund University, Sweden, which addresses the memory and commemoration of the Holocaust in the Czech Republic and Slovakia.
