= Durkheimian Studies =

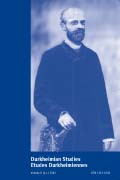
- Discipline: Sociology
- Language: English, French
- Edited by: W. Watts Miller

Publication details
- History: 1995–present
- Publisher: Berghahn Books
- Frequency: Annually

Standard abbreviations
- ISO 4: Durkh. Stud.

Indexing
- ISSN: 1362-024X (print); 1752-2307 (web)
- LCCN: sn96026740
- OCLC no.: 35194034

Links
- Journal homepage; Online archive

Durkheimian Studies (French: Études Durkheimiennes) is an annual peer-reviewed academic journal published by Berghahn Books on behalf of the British Centre for Durkheimian Studies. It covers research on all aspects of the work of Émile Durkheim and his group, as well as the contemporary development and application of their ideas to issues in the social sciences, religion, and philosophy.

== Abstracting and indexing ==
The journal is abstracted and indexed in:

- Anthropological Index
- International Bibliography of Book Reviews of Scholarly Literature on the Humanities and Social Sciences
- International Bibliography of Periodical Literature
- MLA International Bibliography
- Social Services Abstracts
- Sociological Abstracts
- Worldwide Political Science Abstracts
