= Owning My Masters: The Rhetorics of Rhymes & Revolutions =

Owning My Masters: The Rhetorics of Rhymes & Revolutions is a rap album and doctoral dissertation project written and recorded by performance artist, rapper, and professor, A.D. Carson, in fulfillment of the requirements of the degree of Doctor of Philosophy in Rhetorics, Communication and Information Design at Clemson University and submitted March 3, 2017 in a defense to his dissertation committee. This project is believed to be the first rap album or mixtape submitted as a doctoral dissertation for a Ph.D. Using hip hop to explore such ideas as identity, justice, economics, citizenship and language, the songs garnered tens of thousands of views on YouTube, more than 50,000 streams and downloads on SoundCloud and hundreds of thousands of hits on Facebook before it was submitted. The 34-track album is part of a digital archive that consists of original rap music and spoken word poetry as well as videos, prose, and bibliographical resources.

After completing and defending the dissertation, A.D. Carson was hired as the first "Professor of Hip-Hop" in the University of Virginia's Department of Music. The distinction of "first" Professor of Hip-Hop is in name only, as Professor Kyra Gaunt did pioneering hip-hop ethnomusicological work in the Department of Music at the University of Virginia from 1996 to 2002. Owning My Masters: The Rhetorics of Rhymes & Revolutions received international notoriety and was recognized by the Clemson Graduate Student Government as the 2017 Outstanding Dissertation. The album was also named one of "The 10 Best Political Albums of 2017" by @greenleftweekly.
