= Territorial Revisionism and the Allies of Germany in the Second World War =

2012 essay collection about WWII

Territorial Revisionism and the Allies of Germany in the Second World War: Goals, Expectations, Practices
- First edition
- Editor: Marina Cattaruzza, Stefan Dyroff and Dieter Langewiesche
- Language: English
- Publisher: Berghahn Books
- Publication date: 2012

Territorial Revisionism and the Allies of Germany in the Second World War: Goals, Expectations, Practices (2012) is a collection of essays on the annexation of territory by the Allies of World War II edited by Marina Cattaruzza, Stefan Dyroff and Dieter Langewiesche. It received generally positive reviews.
