= Girl studies =

Academic field focused on girlhood

Girl studies, also known as girlhood studies, is an interdisciplinary academic field of study that is focused on girlhood and girls' culture that combines advocacy and the direct perspectives and thoughts of girls themselves. The field emerged in the 1990s after decades of falling under the broader field of women's studies. Scholars within girl studies examine social and cultural elements of girlhood and move away from an adult-centered focus. Those working in the field of girl studies have studied it primarily in relation to other fields that include: sociology, psychology, education, history, literary studies, media studies, and communication studies. Girl studies seeks to work directly with girls themselves in order to analyze their lives and understand the large societal forces at play within them. Scholars in girl studies also explore the connection the field has to women's studies, boyhood studies, and masculinity studies. There are many different definitions of what a girl is. Some may say that a girl is under the age of 18 (a minor). Catherine Driscoll discusses how in the nineteenth century, girls were traditionally defined as younger than the age of consent. Claudia Mitchell and Jacqueline Reid-Walsh discuss girlhood beginning from birth to late twenties. Girlhood is often designated by age and consists of imitating observed and learned adult behavior.

== History and development ==
Girl studies became a field in the 1990s, after the increase in conversation about getting more girls into science, math, and technology fields in the 1980s, though scholars and researchers were studying girls prior to this decade. In the 1970s, some feminist scholars brought to attention the unbalanced focus of boyhood in comparison to girlhood in youth research. Angela McRobbie, Meda Chesney-Lind, and Christine Griffin were some of the few scholars studying and critiquing the lack of study on girlhood and girl culture in the 1970s and 1980s. In the early 1990s, the Harvard Project on Women's Psychology and Girls' Development conducted a study on the social development of relationships of girls. This study found that when they approach adolescence, girls begin to hide their honest feelings and desires from those they are in close relationships with, making it hard for them to express their feelings later in life. In 1992, the American Association of University Women (AAUW) published How Schools Shortchange Girls, "the first national survey to assert a link between girls' psychosocial experience and schooling". Girls often associate school with being unsafe due to sexual harassment and rape. Dress code is a prime example of the control of girls and the message of how what they wear is more valuable than their education. The term ‘daddy’s girl’ is used popularly as an example of how girls are subordinates. Gender roles are a social institution in attempt to control girls.

Girl studies emerged in the 1990s, a time when there was an increased interest from the media and fashion and beauty industries in young women. Advertisers and retailers marketed towards girls by "promising female youth agency and social value" from purchasing the products. Jackie Kirk et al., discuss how terms that are meant for unity and empowerment such as ‘girl power’ are often used for marketing purposes rather than considered in policy making. Consumerism defines who a girl is and companies market towards girls in efforts to spark their attention. Companies would target products towards young girls that would subliminally send them messages about society's expectations of girls which includes toys and dolls such as Bratz dolls, Barbie dolls, my scene dolls. Companies target these types of girls when selling products such as dolls, music, hair, or clothes. This phenomenon is referred to as tween culture and usually correlates to girls who are between nine and thirteen years old. The term tween usually denotes a young girl rather than a boy. This age period is important because it is a time of fundamental development of an adolescent concerning their identity. There are many studies that focus on how gender roles are imposed onto children and children are socialized to behave that way rather than gender roles having a biological element.

Within the academy, there was an increase in feminist and gender studies scholars focusing on intersectionality and subsequently on girls. Discussing intersectionality within girls’ studies is difficult because each girl truly does have their own experience. It is important to recognize this and that each identity that makes up an individual contributes to their unique experience. All aspects of an individual's identity cause them to be at the intersection of multiple oppressions. There are a lot of factors that can go into being a girl such as economic status, race, age, class, gender, sexuality, religion, environment, and ethnicity. Girls are highly influenced from a young age and reprimanded when societal norms are not being followed. Some groups are overlooked, and it is imperative that we consider every single one in policy making and advocacy. Mary Pipher in Reviving Ophelia acknowledges girls with various sexualities, family dynamics, health states, etc. Mary describes girls as trees who are frail in a huge storm. Their roots determine if they are strong enough to withstand the storm. If they are not, they will fall. Girls’ roots are their family and how they are raised, their foundation. Some survive the storm and stay true to themselves, while others let themselves be influenced. In 2008, scholars Claudia Mitchell, Jacqueline Reid-Walsh, and Jackie Kirk established and launched Girlhood Studies: An Interdisciplinary Journal after recognizing the emerging interest in the field at the 2001 "A New Girl Order: Young Women and the Future of Feminist Inquiry" conference at King's College London.

As girl studies develops, "there has been significant movement away from studying girls as future women and toward analyzing girls as members of a unique demographic group", especially in psychology, history, and sociology. There is also a movement towards focusing more on intersectionality and the experiences of girls across the world. In a 2016 article, Claudia Mitchell acknowledges the presence of girlhood studies in Africa, referencing a South African video project called Vikea Abantwana (Protect The Children: A Story about Incest). The video chronicles the life of Philendelini, a young girl who was raped by her father. Mitchell mentions this film to highlight the necessity of girlhood studies; in the film, Philendelini confides in several adult women about her assault and is ignored or turned down in each instance.

On the topic of insuring an intersectional and transnational approach in girl studies, scholar Oneka LaBennett commented “Black schoolgirls and college students have engaged in protests across the globe. Girls themselves have drawn attention to the negative impact of things like white beauty standards, the intersections of racial and gender violence, the problems with police brutality and the school-to-prison pipeline."

Previously a subject of adolescent psychology and feminist studies; girl studies have also grown through the adoption of 'Cool Japan,' a campaign by the Japanese foreign ministry to spread the appeal of Japanese popular culture and images. Due to its preoccupation with Japanese youth and schoolgirls, Cool Japan has become a topic of girl studies, branching out into many areas. Such movements reflect the interdisciplinary nature of girl studies.

Barrie Thorne, Sociology and Gender and Women's studies professor at The University of California Berkeley, described the four interpretations of the term play. The first meaning is some sort of movement or gesture. Boys and girls almost classify themselves and participate collectively in specific activities creating taxonomies. The second definition of play Thorne described is some sort of production. This correlates to joking around in an effort to downplay something stereotypical or offensive. The third definition of play translates to the capacity to accomplish something. This idea compares to the potential someone has by separating genders and highlighting inequality. The fourth and final definition of play according to Thorne corresponds to the belittlement of children. Furthermore, the term play suggests children being naïve and innocent. It also suggests them being less important or their lives to be considered simple, ultimately dismissing them. Thorne points out how it is common for men to invade verbal space when a woman is talking by interrupting, just like they dominated on the playground when they were younger.

== Effect on girls ==
It is common for girls to have eating disorders, emotional trauma, and fear of sexual harassment. Girls develop a negative perception of themselves which takes a toll on their confidence and capability. Peggy Orenstein concocted the term 'confidence gap' and noticed a trend that young girls experience. Orenstein concluded that no matter economic status, geographic region, education, or race, girls still received the same messages and experienced the confidence gap. Orenstein notes that girls experience a decrease in confidence once they reach adolescence. Throughout the book, Peggy studies two girls in the eighth grade from two different backgrounds. Along her study, she noted that it was common for girls to experience eating disorders, sexual harassment, and therefore a decrease in academic performance, specifically in math and science. Orenstein discovers that the reasons girls undergo the confidence gap, is because of gender bias and sexism in school, family relations and friendship rooted in societal norms, and cultural standards. Sex abuse is often normalized in highly urban areas and girls do not have the access to sexual education to teach them about consent and protection. They then can become susceptible to teen pregnancy and sexually transmitted diseases.

There have been several other studies conducted that examine the relationship between the media and girls' relationships with their bodies.

== Media influence ==
Popular culture oriented toward girls and young women often reinforces very limited depictions of desirable girlhood. Films such as Mean Girls criticize these norms while simultaneously maintain them. For example, the main characters are slim, white, and heterosexual while background characters are those of different sexualities, races, and body types. Girls desire to look and act like their idols they see in media, which supports Gerbner's cultivation theory in what is shown in the media gives the notion that it is normal in society. It is vital that young girls have a diverse group of role models to idolize in the media. When girls have someone that looks like them in the media, it shows them that they are just as capable. For example, people often obsessed over Serena Williams' hair, clothing, and body because she was not white and skinny like most women role models in the media.

In Shakespeare's As You Like It, he references the seven stages of mankind. This piece is male oriented and describes boys going from boyhood to manhood. The only mention of women is in the piece is sparking the attention of the male. This traditional description of women alludes to the fact that they are merely objects and placed on Earth for the benefit of men. More modern examples of literature depict women in a much more accurate and less male-centric way. In addition to better portrayals of women in media, there has also been more women creating media. There are many scholars that study how media affects young girls in regards to women representation and also women who make this media.

== Black girlhood studies ==
Black Girlhood Studies has developed in recent years to combat the white washed field of Girls' studies. Black girlhood studies is understood as a site of Black feminist inquiry with aims of centering the coming into knowing Black girls’ experience and representations of Black girlhood. In Black Girlhood Celebration: Toward a Hip-hop Feminist Ruth Nicole Brown states that Black girlhood are, “the representations, memories, and lived experiences of being and becoming in a body marked as youthful, Black, and female.” For Brown, Black girlhood is a powerful concept that enables Black girls to create sacred spaces for themselves and each other even while structural forces work “to posit [Black girls] as the very “risky” problem, an aberration of normal.” Brown’s sentiments were echoed again during the 2016 “Black Girl Movement: A National Conference”, a three-day conference at Columbia University in New York City that focused on Black girls, cis, queer, and trans girls, in the United States. The purpose of the conference was to recognize that while Black girls are “among the most significant cultural producers, community connectors, and trendsetters”, Black girls still remain highly invisible and “are in crisis.” Scholars have used this moment to theorize liberating projects for Black girls and Black girlhood, a site of both theoretical and practical analysis. Founded by LaKisha Simmons, Renee Sentilles, and Corinne Field, History of Black Girlhood: An Academic Network (2015) provides a forum for scholars centering Black girlhood to share work and collaborate. While many of the work in Black Girlhood Studies is contemporary, there are Black feminist canonical texts that home in on the ways in which Black girlhood has always already been present in the work of Black women (Tomorrow's Tomorrow 1971 written by Joyce Ladner, The Bluest Eye 1970 and Beloved 1987 written by Toni Morrison, For Colored Girls Who Have Considered Suicide / When the Rainbow is Enuf 1976 by Ntozake Shange, and Bone Black: Memories of Girlhood 1996 by bell hooks, among many others). These materials span literature, film, poetry, policy, magazine articles, and so on.

Many of the texts foundational to the contemporary field of Black girlhood studies fall within an ethnographic tradition. These works include Elizabeth Chin's Purchasing Power: Black Kids and American Consumer Culture (2001), Kyra Gaunt's The Games Black Girls Play: Learning the Ropes from Double-Dutch to Hip-Hop (2006), Ruth Nicole Brown's Black Girlhood Celebration: Toward a Hip-hop Feminist Pedagogy (2009) Oneka LaBennett's She’s Mad Real: Popular Culture and West Indian Girls in Brooklyn (2011), Aimee Cox's Shapeshifters: Black Girls and the Choreography of Citizenship (2015), and Aria Halliday's Buy Black: How Black Women Transformed US Pop Culture (2022). These texts examine Black girls’ complex racialized, gendered, and age-based cultural realities as they navigate and resist multiple forms of violences. These ethnographies are rooted in a Black feminist epistemological emphasis on centering lived experiences.

Historians Abosede George's Making Modern Girls: A history of girlhood, labor, and social development in 20th century colonial Lagos (2015), Marcia Chatelain's South Side Girls: Growing Up in the Great Migration (2015), and LaKisha Simmons's Crescent City Girls: The Lives of Young Black Women in Segregated New Orleans (2015) extends beyond the ethnographic work of the field in which the three scholars mentioned focus on place and social history to tell the stories of Black girls. This regional approach emphasizes the necessary local specifies of Black girlhood. Nazera Sadiq Wright's Black Girlhood in the Nineteenth Century (2016) traces a long literary tradition to discover the origins of Black girlhood as we have come to understand the category today.

== Criticism ==
As an emerging field, girl studies has faced some criticisms from other scholars. Janie Victoria Wald and Beth Cooper Benjamin have found that connections between "girls' psychosocial development and persistent issues in adult women's lives" are not as present in recent scholarship as they were during the advent of the field and believe they should be in order to explore intergenerational relationships. These two scholars also criticize the increased specialization of focus in the field and subsequent disconnect between the subfields. Mary Celeste Kearney, a scholar who does work in girl studies, notices that though there is a focus on intersectionality within the field, "non-white, non-Western girls remain vastly understudied as result of such research being conducted primarily in Canada, Australia, Great Britain, Northern Europe, and the United States." Some critics identify problems that they see with the field as a whole, claiming that it is neither a new nor exciting field, as the Girlhood Studies journal states, but rather one that is established and in crisis. Kirk, Jackie et al. discussed how they experienced dishonesty in studies and self-censoring from girls to adhere to societal norms.

== Future of girlhood ==
Girlhood and girl power work together to form a strong bond between young girls across the globe. When girls are growing up, they are learning from the women around them, what is right and what is wrong. Women of the older ages are set up as role models for those who are under the age of 18. The future of girlhood is in the hands of those who choose to set a good example forward for these young people to grasp onto. Marnina et al., explained in their book that we are past the after-girl power stage (2009) and that what comes next remains a mystery. Girls have seen violence in numerous stages thus making them fear the whole process of growing up. As mentioned in the text History and Popular Culture at Work in the Subjectivity of a Tween, the author's daughter was scared to become an adult because of the concerns of others. Other people in her class were bringing articles and other pieces of writing that scared Elisabeth into thinking that growing up was not something that she wanted to do. With girls having these types of ideas rushing through their minds as they get older – we are not helping them grow in a safe space, instead, we are raising them to fear the outside world and not want to be a part of it. This can change if we focus on what comes next once we pass the after-girl power.

In addition to positive role models for young girls, the field itself can grow once girl studies is seen as an established discipline. The field lacks the type of attention that other feminist fields get. Kearney claims that some factors that contributes to the lack of scholarly attention that girl studies receives includes adult-centric feminism, male dominance in the public sphere, and the ambiguity that surrounds the field. Once girl studies is acknowledged as a serious feminist discipline then more ideas and conversation can be generated for girl studies to grow.
