= Sarah Mills =

Sarah Mills or Sara Mills may refer to:

- Sarah Mills (Zixx), fictional character
- Sarah Mills (Harper's Island), fictional character
- Sarah Mills (water polo), played for Australia women's national water polo team
- Sara Mills (linguist), English linguist
