= Berrin (name) =

Berrin is a Turkish feminine given name that means high, superior; derived from the Persian word, berîn. Notable people with the name include:

- Berrin Menderes, wife of Turkish prime minister Adnan Menderes
- Berrin Yanıkkaya, Turkish professor at the Yeditepe University
