= Joan Faber McAlister =

American rhetorician

- Born: Cedar Rapids, Iowa, U.S.
- Occupations: Educator, researcher, writer

Academic background
- Education: Ph.D. in rhetorical studies
- Alma mater: University of Iowa
- Thesis: No place like home : the American crisis of community and the renovation of suburban space at the end of the twentieth century (2005)

Joan Faber McAlister is an American rhetorician, associate professor and researcher of women's studies in communication. Her research primarily focuses on how images and space communicate messages in public culture through perceptions of beauty and critical theory. From 2014 until 2017, McAlister served as the editor of Women's Studies in Communication.

== Education and career ==
Joan Faber McAlister attended Boise State University, from which she received a B.A. in anthropology in 1994 with an emphasis in cultural studies and ethnography; she completed her M.A. in communication at the same institution. Faber received her Ph.D. in rhetorical studies from the University of Iowa.

From 2014 until 2017, McAlister served as the editor-in-chief of the journal Women's Studies in Communication. In 2023 she was a member of the Editorial Board.

As of 2022, she is an associate professor of communication at Drake University in Des Moines, Iowa.

== Scholarly work ==
McAlister's research focuses primarily on how images and space communicate messages in public culture through perceptions of beauty and critical theory. Her research uses critical theory to confront ideological, societal, and structural binds found in culture and literature. McAlister focuses on analyzing topics including Congressional hearings, popular films, national news coverage, magazine advertisements, reality television, urban planning, and architecture. She approaches these documents with a focus on the relationship between social location and rhetoric, i.e.: how different individuals are placed in power and how the factors of class, gender, race, and sexuality impact these individuals. Her research is concerned with the different factors that impact cultural performance and create a sense of belonging that could have detrimental outcomes. She focuses on the concept of "home" being more than just a physical location. McAlister has stated that home is "about relationships between you and your environment [...] between your desires and your limitations [...and] associations between regional identities and cultures."

=== Collecting the Gaze ===
McAlister's essay Collecting the Gaze: Memory, Agency, and Kinship in the Women's Jail Museum, Johannesburg discusses the views of Walter Benjamin in the Women's Jail Museum in Johannesburg, South Africa. Benjamin was a German-Jewish philosopher who died in 1940 at the Women's Jail while avoiding deportation to either a French concentration camp or to Nazi Germany. The Women's Jail is now a site that rests on the grounds of a former racially segregated prison that was in use from 1910 to 1983, during which apartheid laws sought to assure the dominance of white people. Those who resisted often faced repercussions, drawing a parallel between the Women's Jail and a Nazi regime. The Women's Jail holds visible memories of former inmates, directing the tourists' gaze through haunting collections of personal items such as newspaper clippings. Benjamin's collection often included very personal items such as wedding photographs, shoes, and quotes that were placed where women had once lived and worked, to present more depth into their personal experiences.

McAlister then discusses how feminist critics of visual and public memories have concerns about the use of the gaze and the ability it has to change subjects into objects that then create a uniform story. The male gaze, in feminist theory, is associated with objectifying, defining, and exploiting females into objects for sexual pleasure to be viewed. The "tourist gaze" is a way of viewing culture as a commodity and can shift tragic sites of trauma into a site that offers pleasure at the expense of others' pain, often with a consumerist goal. McAlister discusses how the gaze of visual and memorial culture causes concern about re-establishing hierarchical systems of race, class, gender, and sexuality that construct identities either through places of public memory or through the objectification of females. She also discusses how the Women's Jail displays the daily life of the prisoners such as the humiliating conditions that menstruating inmates were forced to live through. This includes exhibits detailing how inmates were not allowed to wear undergarments and were forced to push their thighs together or utilize shoelaces to hold pads in place while working. This shows the notable difference between the experiences of female and male prisoners which provides visitors with a different gaze into the particular details of daily life while being incarcerated. McAlister's article discusses how the Women's Jail asks visitors to share the responsibility to collect and preserve the past in order to change views of both the past and the future.

=== Lives of the Mind/Body ===
McAlister's article Lives of the Mind/Body: Alarming Notes on the Tenure and Biological Clocks seeks to draw attention to the biological clocks that women are encouraged to constantly worry about throughout their careers. It discusses the idea that women are torn between achieving academically, as in McAlister's situation, and keeping reproductive "expiration dates" to themselves. The article says that, if women pay too much attention to their biological clocks in order to begin a family, they will seemingly struggle to stay at the same pace as their male colleagues. McAlister discusses her fear that bringing children into her life would cause her to be viewed as feminine and motherly which would contradict her outward professional persona as a scholar. She notes that having children was often viewed as being uncommitted to academic work by her male colleagues who were published or more revered. It was only after discussing this dilemma with her advisor, a well-established scholar, that McAlister decided to have children.

While she continued to pursue a tenured position, McAlister found that she needed to keep her bodily connections with her babies private. For example, she discusses hiding in a corner of a conference room to prepare for her "job talk" when in fact she needed time to breast pump. She discusses how asking for time for this specific task would have made her seem potentially less fit for the position she was ultimately offered. The article also discusses the biological-clock point-of-view in McAlister's missing many "firsts" from first steps to first words while working on her dissertation and pursuing her scholarly goals. The article concludes by underlining the need to draw attention to how scholarly discourse is gendered and requires more discussion on what defines productivity.

== Personal life ==
McAllister's first child was born stillborn on April 3, 2000. She later had a daughter and twins (one male and one female).

== Selected publications ==
- McAlister, Joan Faber (2008-07-01). "Lives of the Mind/Body: Alarming Notes on the Tenure and Biological Clocks". Women's Studies in Communication. 31 (2): 218–225. doi:10.1080/07491409.2008.10162536. ISSN 0749-1409. S2CID 145741939.
- McAlister, Joan Faber (2009). "_ trash in the White House: Michelle Obama, post-racism, and the pre-class politics of domestic style". Communication and Critical/Cultural Studies. 6 (3): 311–315. doi:10.1080/14791420903063844. S2CID 144331165.
- McAlister, Joan Faber (2010). "Domesticating citizenship: The kairotopics of America's post-9/11 home makeover". Critical Studies in Media Communication. 27 (1): 84–104. doi:10.1080/15295030903554391. S2CID 218542606.
- McAlister, Joan Faber (2011-09-01). "Figural Materialism: Renovating Marriage through the American Family Home". Southern Communication Journal. 76 (4): 279–304. doi:10.1080/10417941003797314. ISSN 1041-794X. S2CID 143641645.
- McAlister, Joan Faber (2013-02-01). "Collecting the Gaze: Memory, Agency, and Kinship in the Women's Jail Museum, Johannesburg". Women's Studies in Communication. 36 (1): 1–27. doi:10.1080/07491409.2012.754389. ISSN 0749-1409. S2CID 143691953.

== Awards and honors ==
In 2016, McAlister received the Francine Merritt Award for "outstanding contributions to the lives of women in communication" from the National Communication Association.
