= Abosede George =

Nigerian-American academic

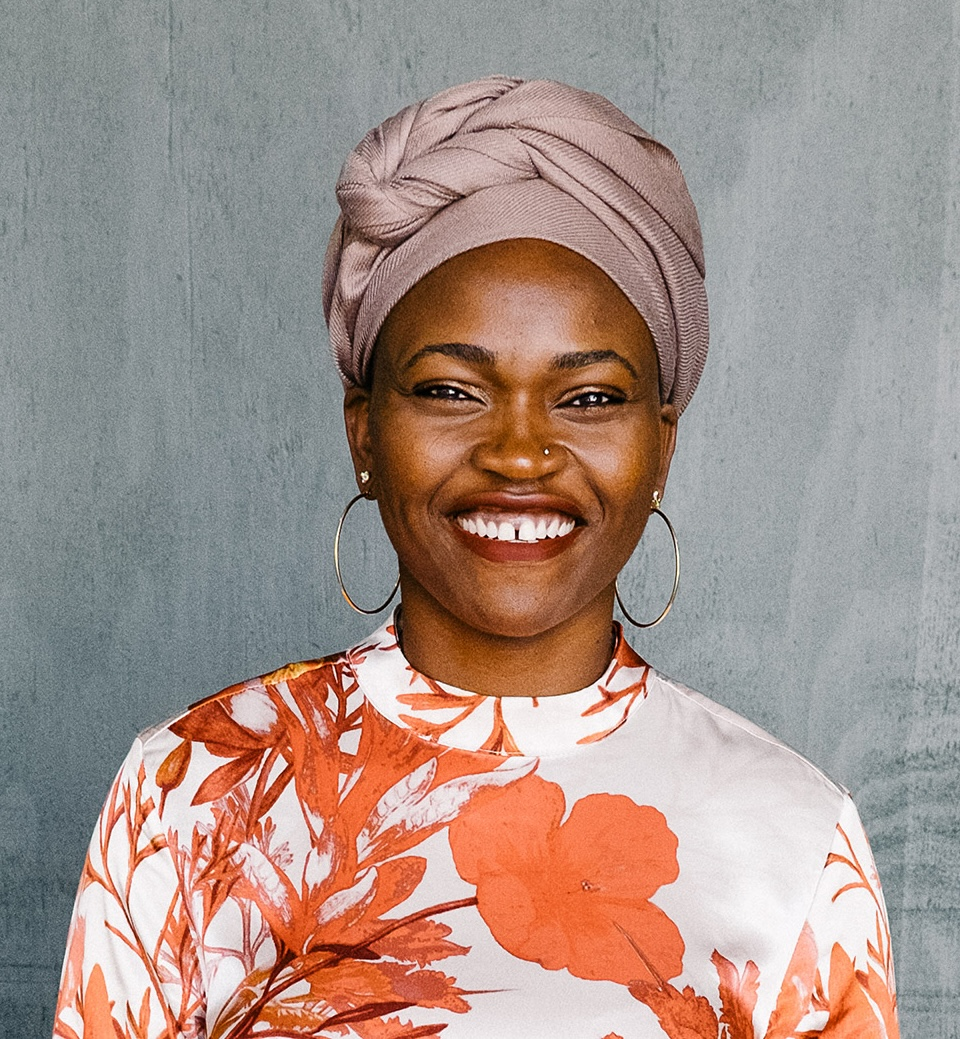
- Born: Abosede Ajibike George
- Awards: Aidoo-Snyder Book Prize, African Studies Association Women's Caucus, 2015; 2019 Paula J. Giddings Best Article Award

Academic background
- Education: Rutgers University; Stanford University
- Thesis: Gender and Juvenile Justice: Girl Hawkers in Lagos 1925-1950
- Academic advisor: Richard Roberts
- Website: barnard.edu/profiles/abosede-george

Abosede George is the Tow Associate Professor of History and Africana Studies at Barnard College and Columbia University in New York, where she is also the Director of its Institute of African Studies. She teaches courses on African migrations, historical mapping, urban history, African history, childhood and youth studies, girl studies, women's studies, and migration studies, gender and sexuality in African History. She is the incumbent President of the Nigerian Studies Association, an affiliate organization of the African Studies Association.

Her book, Making Modern Girls: A History of Girlhood, Labor, and Social Development was published in 2014 by Ohio University Press and received the Aidoo-Snyder Book Prize in 2015 from the Women’s Caucus of the African Studies Association, as well as Honorable Mention from the New York African Studies Association.

== Background ==
Abosede George obtained her B.A. in history from Rutgers University in 1999. She proceeded to Stanford University where she earned her M.A. and Ph.D. degrees in history in 2002 and 2006 respectively.

== Career ==
George began her teaching career in 2003 at Stanford University as a Teaching Fellow. In 2006, she moved to Trinity College as an assistant professor of history and international studies. George joined the faculty of Barnard College and Columbia University in 2007. Her research and teaching interests are in the areas of African urban history, history of childhood and youth in Africa, and women, gender, and sexuality in African History. From January to May 2011, she was a visiting assistant professor at her alma mater, Rutgers College – Rutgers University. In the Fall of 2022, George was admitted as a Fellow in Residence at the Netherlands Institute for Advanced Study in Amsterdam for her project, "Migrants and the Making of Urban Culture in Nineteenth Century Lagos."

George has published widely on subjects such as girlhood in African/colonial cities, urbanism and social reform in colonial Africa, among others. Her articles have appeared in several first-tier, peer-reviewed academic journals, including the Journal of Social History, Women’s Studies Quarterly, and the Scholar and Feminist Online. George was one of the seven historians engaged in the AHR Conversation themed “Each Generation Writes Its Own History of Generations”. Her book, Making Modern Girls: A History of Girlhood, Labor, and Social Development, which was published in 2014, won her the 2015 Aidoo-Snyder Book Prize as the best scholarly book. Lately, she won the 2019 Paula J. Giddings Best Article Award for her article "Saving Nigerian Girls: A Critical Reflection on Girl-Saving C[11]ampaigns in the Colonial and Neoliberal Eras".

Her publications have appeared in the American Historical Review, the Journal of Social History, Comparative Studies in South Asia, Africa, and the Middle East, Meridians, Women’s Studies Quarterly, the Journal of West African History, and the Washington Post among other outlets. She is the founder of The Ekopolitan Project, a digital forum dedicated to historical research on migrant communities in nineteenth- and twentieth century Lagos, West Africa.

George maintains faculty affiliations with the Africana Studies Program at Barnard, the Institute for African Studies at Columbia (IAS), the Barnard Center for Research on Women (BCRW), and the Center for the Critical Analysis of Social Difference (CCASD). She is a member of the following professional organizations: African Studies Association, Society for the History of Childhood and Youth, and Nigerian Studies Association where she is the current President. She is equally a member of the Board of Directors of the Lagos Studies Association, of which, together with Saheed Aderinto and Ademide Adelusi-Adeluyi, she is a foundation member.

Beyond academia, Abosede George has undertaken a number of creative, historical projects. For instance, the 2018 Lagos Photo Festival featured George's audio piece project which reworks the archives of a court case from the late 1800s in Lagos, Nigeria. An audio booth was provided in which visitors would sit in and listen to the trial and testimonies from the court case Ayebomi vs. Regina. The work received coverage by Vogue Italia.

== Selected publications ==
- George, Abosede (2021-09-01). "Brazilian-Style Architecture and Lagosian Modernity". Journal of West African History. 7 (2): 115–132. doi:10.2307/48642061. ISSN 2327-1868.
- George, Abosede (2018-12-01). "IntroductionThe Imaginative Capital of Lagos". Comparative Studies of South Asia, Africa and the Middle East. 38 (3): 439–442. doi:10.1215/1089201x-7208779. ISSN 1089-201X.
- George, Abosede; Glaser, Clive; Jacobs, Margaret D.; Joshi, Chitra; Marker, Emily; Walsham, Alexandra; Zheng, Wang; Weisbrod, Bernd (2018-12-01). "AHR Conversation: Each Generation Writes Its Own History of Generations". The American Historical Review. 123 (5): 1505–1546. doi:10.1093/ahr/rhy389. ISSN 0002-8762.
- George, Abosede (2018-11-01). "Saving Nigerian GirlsA Critical Reflection on Girl-Saving Campaigns in the Colonial and Neoliberal Eras". Meridians. 17 (2): 309–324. doi:10.1215/15366936-7176461. ISSN 1536-6936. S2CID 85536005. Winner of the 2019 Paula J. Giddings Best Article Award.
- George, Abosede (2017). "A Philosopher with a Plan: Reflections on Ifi Amadiume's Male Daughters, Female Husbands". Journal of West African History. 3 (2): 124–130. doi:10.14321/jwestafrihist.3.2.0124. JSTOR 10.14321/jwestafrihist.3.2.0124. S2CID 158335674.
- Field, Corinne T.; Owens, Tammy-Charelle; Chatelain, Marcia; Simmons, Lakisha; George, Abosede; Keyse, Rhian (2016). "The History of Black Girlhood: Recent Innovations and Future Directions". The Journal of the History of Childhood and Youth. 9 (3): 383–401. doi:10.1353/hcy.2016.0067. ISSN 1941-3599. S2CID 151491585.
- George, Abosede A. (2014-11-15). Making Modern Girls: A History of Girlhood, Labor, and Social Development in ... – Abosede A. George – Google Books. ISBN 9780821445013. Winner of the 2015 Aidoo-Snyder Book Prize of the African Studies Association Women's Caucus.
- George, Abosede (2013), “Getting the Hang of It,” Scholar and Feminist Online: Gender, Justice, and Neoliberal Transformations, 11, nos. 1&2.
- George, Abosede (2011). "Within Salvation: Girl Hawkers and the Colonial State in Development Era Lagos". Journal of Social History. 44 (3): 837–859. doi:10.1353/jsh.2011.0034. JSTOR 41305383. PMID 21853619. S2CID 639541.
- George, Abosede A. (2007). "Feminist Activism and Class Politics: The Example of the Lagos Girl Hawker Project". Women's Studies Quarterly. 35 (3/4): 128–143. ISSN 0732-1562.
