= Girlhood Studies =

- Discipline: Gender Studies, Education, Anthropology, Sociology, Psychology, Literary Studies, Media Studies
- Language: English
- Edited by: Claudia Mitchell

Publication details
- History: 2008–present
- Publisher: Berghahn Books
- Frequency: Triannual

Standard abbreviations
- ISO 4: Girlhood Stud.

Indexing
- ISSN: 1938-8209 (print); 1938-8322 (web)
- OCLC no.: 144560104

Links
- Journal homepage; Online archive

Girlhood Studies: An Interdisciplinary Journal is a peer-reviewed academic journal established in 2008 by Jackie Kirk, Claudia Mitchell, and Jacqueline Reid-Walsh and published by Berghahn Journals. It became an official journal of the International Girls Studies Association (IGSA) in 2019. The journal discusses girlhood from the perspective of a broad range of fields including education, health, media studies, and literary studies. Of the three issues a year, two are themed issues on particular topics. The editor-in-chief is Claudia Mitchell (McGill University). Girlhood Studies: An Interdisciplinary Journal received the award of Best New Journal in the Social Sciences & Humanities from the Association of American Publishers in 2009. The journal led to the establishment of a complementary book series, Transnational Girlhoods, in 2019, also published by Berghahn.

== Editors ==
- Editor-in-Chief: Claudia Mitchell, McGill University, Canada
- Managing Editor: Ann Smith, McGill University, Canada
- Reviews Editor: Marnina Gonick, Mount St. Vincent University, Canada

== Abstracting and indexing ==
Girlhood Studies is abstracted and indexed in:

- Bibliometric Research Indicator List (BFI)
- Biography Index (Ebsco)
- Emerging Sciences Citation Index (Web of Science)
- European Reference Index for the Humanities and the Social Sciences (ERIH PLUS)
- MLA International Bibliography
- Norwegian Register for Scientific Journals, Series and Publishers
- Scopus (Elsevier)
- Social Sciences Abstracts (Ebsco)
- Social Sciences Index (Ebsco)
- Studies on Women and Gender Abstracts (Taylor & Francis)
- TOC Premier Table of Contents (Ebsco)
- Women's Studies Librarian: Feminist Periodicals (University of Wisconsin)
