= Girl Heroes =

2002 book by Susan Hopkins

- Author: Susan Hopkins
- Publisher: Pluto Press
- Publication date: 2002
- Pages: 233 pp.
- ISBN: 978-1-86403-157-7
- OCLC: 50881045

Girl Heroes: The New Force In Popular Culture is a 2002 book by Susan Hopkins. It is a cultural analysis of the contemporary archetype of the girl hero in popular culture.

Hopkins argues for a link between the 1990s British band Spice Girls, their vision of girl power, and the creation of a new kind of "girl hero". Hopkins also explores the roles of figures such as supermodels, magical girls, Carmen Sandiego, Britney Spears, Lara Croft, Xena, Dana Scully, the Charlie's Angels (the 2000s version), Sabrina Spellman, Mulan, and Buffy Summers.

She also draws comparisons between these images and earlier ones, such as Emma Peel of The Avengers, the 1970s television show Wonder Woman, Madonna and the Charlie's Angels TV show of the 1970s, pointing out the relative independence of this archetype from male and parental support.

== See also ==
- List of female action heroes
- Buffy studies
- Femininity
- Feminization (sociology)
- Gender representation in video games
- Girl power
- Magical girl
- Matriarchy
- Post-feminism
- Sex-positive feminism
- Woman warrior
- Wonder Women! The Untold Story of American Superheroines
