= Vicki Karaminas =

New Zealand fashion academic

- Education: University of Technology, Sydney
- Awards: Humanities Aronui Medal
- Scientific career
- Fields: Fashion
- Workplaces: Massey University
- Thesis: Interrupted journeys : travelling light : [soma]tographies of space (2002)

Vicki Karaminas is a New Zealand fashion academic, and a full professor at Massey University. In 2024 the Royal Society Te Apārangi awarded Karaminas the Humanities Aronui Medal for her work advancing the discipline of fashion studies.

== Academic career ==
After a 2002 PhD titled 'Interrupted journeys : travelling light : [soma]tographies of space' at the University of Technology, Sydney, Karaminas moved to Massey University, rising to full professor.

In November 2024, the Royal Society Te Apārangi awarded Karaminas the Humanities Aronui Medal for her work advancing the discipline of fashion studies. The award citation noted her work developing a philosophical framework Critical Fashion Practice, and the three book series she has edited.

== Selected works ==
- Geczy, Adam, and Vicki Karaminas. Queer style. A&C Black, 2013.
- Geczy, Adam, and Vicki Karaminas, eds. Fashion and art. Berg, 2013.
- Wilson, Elizabeth, Christopher Breward, Shaun Cole, Peter McNeil, Vicki Karaminas, and Jonathan D. Katz. A queer history of fashion: From the closet to the catwalk. Edited by Valerie Steele. New Haven, CT: Yale University Press, 2013.
- Geczy, Adam, and Vicki Karaminas. "Fashion and art: Critical crossovers." Art Monthly Australia 242 (2011): 5.
- Peter McNeil and Vicki Karaminas. The Men's Fashion Reader ISBN 1845207874
