= Allyson Jule =

Allyson Mary Julé is a Canadian academic and Professor of Education at the University of the Fraser Valley, in British Columbia, Canada. She has lectured worldwide in her field, and written and edited many academic publications on feminist linguistics and pedagogy.

She authored A Beginner's Guide to Language and Gender and Gender and Participation and Silence in the Language Classroom: Sh-shushing the Girls and is best known for her work on "linguistic space" and the silencing of girls and women, particularly in religious classroom communities. Jule is also media reviews editor for Women & Language journal and servers on the executive council for the International Gender and Language Association.

== Education ==
Julé graduated from the University of Alberta with a B.Ed. in intercultural education and went on to earn a master's degree in education at Simon Fraser University. She continued her academic studies in London, UK, at Roehampton Institute, earning a Ph.D. in education. She has also studied at the University of Ottawa (linguistics) and the University of British Columbia (adult education).

== Bibliography ==
The following is an incomplete bibliography:

1. Jule, A. (Ed.) (2019). The compassionate educator: Understanding social issues in Canadian schools. Toronto, ON: Canadian Scholars Press.
2. Jule, A. (2018). Speaking Up: Understanding language and gender. [Trade edition.] Clevedon, UK: Multilingual Matters.
3. Jule, A. (2017). A beginner's guide to language and gender, 2nd edition. Clevedon, UK: Multilingual Matters.
4. Jule, A. (Ed.) (2015). Shifting visions: Gender and discourse. Cambridge, UK: Cambridge Scholarly Press.
5. Jule, A. and B. Pederson (Eds.) (2015). Facing challenges: Feminism in Christian higher education and Other Places. Cambridge, UK: Cambridge Scholarly Press.
6. Julé, Allyson (2008). A Beginner's Guide to Language and Gender. MM Textbooks (1st ed.). Clevedon: Multilingual Matters. ISBN 978-1-84769-056-2.
7. ——————; Pedersen, Bettina Tate, eds. (2006). Being Feminist, Being Christian: Essays from Academia. New York: Palgrave Macmillan. ISBN 978-1-4039-7295-8.
8. ——————, ed. (2005). Gender and the Language of Religion. Basingstoke: Palgrave Macmillan. ISBN 978-1-4039-4862-5.
9. —————— (2003). Gender, Participation and Silence in the Language Classroom: Sh-shushing the Girls. Basingstoke: Palgrave Macmillan. ISBN 978-1-4039-1583-2.

== Awards and recognition ==
Jule is a 2016 3M National Teaching Fellow.

== Official Website ==
- Official website
