= Alice Robb =

American writer

Alice Robb (born 1992) is an American writer. She regularly contributes book reviews to New Statesman. Her first book Why We Dream is about the science of dreaming. Her second book is the memoir Don't Think, Dear: On Loving and Leaving Ballet, released in 2023.

== Early life and education ==
Robb is from New York and was accepted to the School of American Ballet (SAB) in 2001, with aspirations to join the New York City Ballet (NYCB). She graduated from the University of Oxford with a Bachelor of Arts (BA) in Archaeology and Anthropology.

== Bibliography ==
=== Books ===
- Why We Dream: The Transformative Power of Our Nightly Journey (2018)
- Don't Think, Dear: On Loving and Leaving Ballet (2023)

=== Book reviews ===
Year	Review article	Work(s) reviewed
2020	Robb, Alice (April 3–23, 2020). "The attention paradox". The Critics. Books. New Statesman. 149 (5514): 73, 75.	Schwartz, Casey. Attention : a love story. Ballantine Books.
