= Girl power =

Slogan encouraging women's empowerment

Girl power is a slogan that encourages and celebrates women's empowerment and positivity. The slogan's invention is credited to the American punk band Bikini Kill, who published a zine called Bikini Kill #2: Girl Power in 1991. It was then popularized in the mainstream by the British girl group the Spice Girls in the mid-1990s. According to Rolling Stone magazine, the Spice Girls' usage of "girl power" was one of the defining cultural touchstones that shaped the Millennial generation, particularly during their childhood in the 1990s. The usage of the slogan is still considered relevant three decades later in the 2020s through continued feminist movements.

== Early usage and origins ==
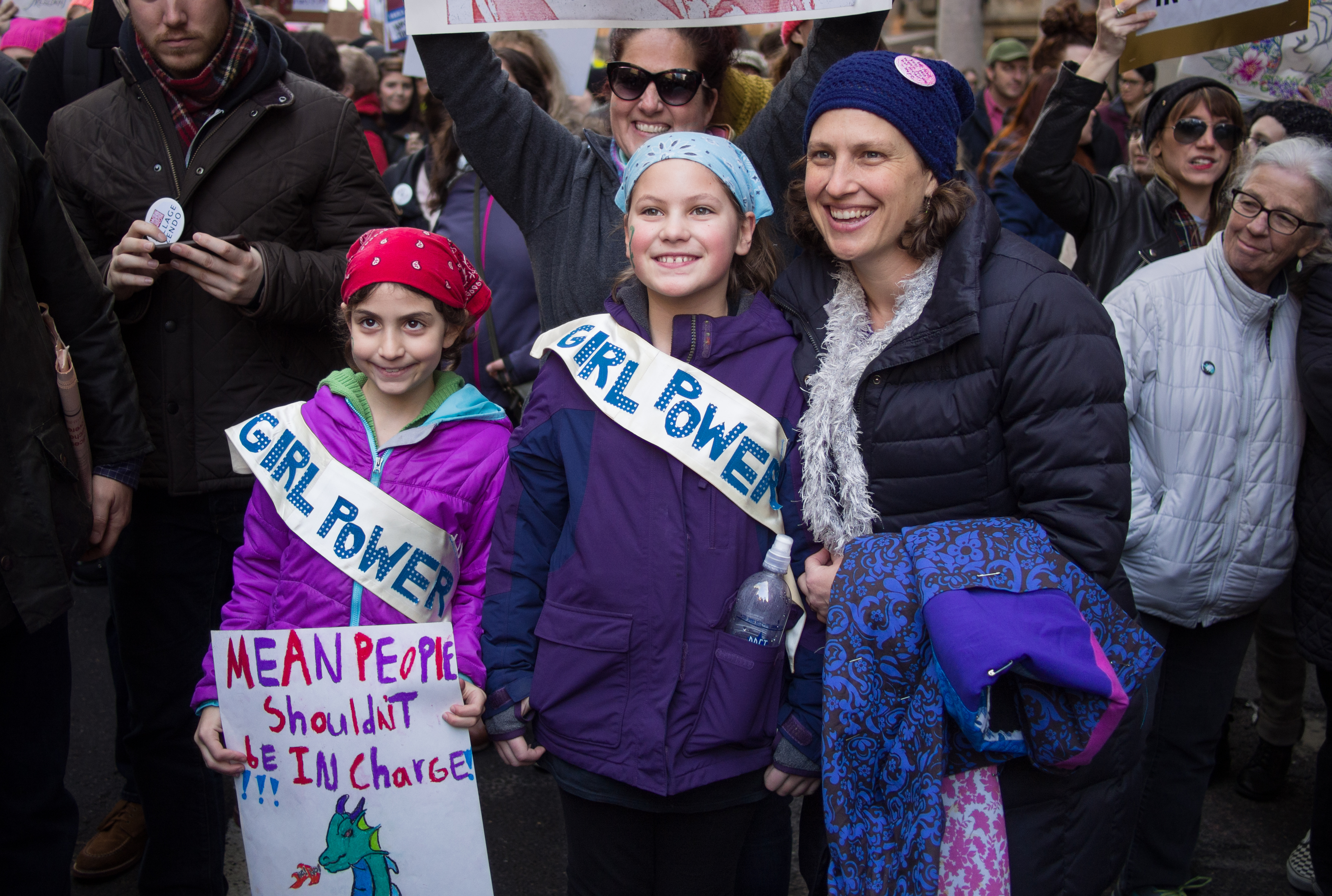
Girls wearing "Girl power" sashes at the 2017 Women's March in New York City

In 1990, American punk band Bikini Kill started to make their self-titled feminist zine. Its first issue had the subtitle, A color and activity book. A year later the band published the second issue of their Bikini Kill zine, with the new subtitle Girl Power. The band's lead singer, Kathleen Hanna, said it was inspired by the Black Power slogan. The authors of Young Femininity: Girlhood, Power and Social Change argue that the term also draws inspiration from 80s Black female, hip hop vernacular, "You go girl."

The term became popular in the early and mid 90s punk culture. The Rolling Stone Encyclopedia of Rock & Roll credits the zine with coining the slogan: "In their feminist fanzine Bikini Kill they articulated an agenda for young women in and outside of music; the band put those ideas to practice. Bikini Kill earned a reputation in the punk underground for confronting certain standards of that genre; for example, asking people to slam at the side of the stage, so that women would not get pushed out of the front, and inviting women to take the mic and talk about sexual abuse."

The phrase is sometimes sensationally spelled "grrrl power", based on the spelling of "riot grrrl." The Riot Grrrl movement was pioneered by Bikini Kill in the 1990s through their music and pushback on the punk industry’s sexist culture.

Some other musical artists who have used the slogan in their music are Welsh band Helen Love, with it appearing in the chorus of their 1992 song "Formula One Racing Girls", and pop-punk duo Shampoo, who released an album and single titled Girl Power in 1995. The slogan was integrated into children’s entertainment as well, The Cheetah Girls released their single "Girl Power" in 2003 through Disney.

== Spice Girls ==
British pop quintet the Spice Girls brought the mantra into the mainstream consciousness in the mid-1990s. The Spice Girls' version of "girl power" focused on the importance of strong and loyal friendship among women and girls, with a message of empowerment that appealed to young girls, adolescents and adult women. According to Billboard magazine, they demonstrated real, noncompetitive female friendship, singing: "If you wannabe my lover, you gotta get with my friends. Make it last forever; friendship never ends."

In all, the focused, consistent presentation of "girl power" formed the centrepiece of their appeal as a band. Some commentators credit the Spice Girls with reinvigorating mainstream feminism in the 1990s, with the "girl power" mantra serving as a gateway to feminism for their young fans. On the other hand, some critics dismissed "girl power" as no more than a shallow marketing tactic, while others took issue with the emphasis on physical appearance, concerned about the potential impact on self-conscious and/or impressionable youngsters: As American feminist Jennifer Pozner famously remarked, it was "probably a fair assumption to say that a 'zig-a-zig-ah' is not Spice shorthand for 'subvert the dominant paradigm'". Regardless, the phrase became a cultural phenomenon, adopted as the mantra for millions of girls and even making it into the Oxford English Dictionary. In summation of the concept, author Ryan Dawson said, "The Spice Girls changed British culture enough for Girl Power to now seem completely unremarkable."

In 2018, Rolling Stone named the Spice Girls' brand of "girl power" on The Millennial 100, a list of 100 people, music, cultural touchstones and movements that have shaped the millennial generation.

== Scholarship ==
In her 2002 book Girl Heroes: The New Force in Popular Culture, Susan Hopkins suggested a correlation between "girl power", the Spice Girls, and female action heroes at the end of the 20th century. A later book, Growing Up With Girl Power, by Rebecca Hains (2012) found that the phrase "girl power" and the media associated with it—such as the Spice Girls and girl heroes—diluted the phrase's impact from the riot grrrls' intent, making it more about marketing and selling the idea of empowerment than about furthering girls' actual empowerment.

The slogan has also been examined within the context of the academic field, for example Buffy studies. Media theorist Kathleen Rowe Karlyn in her article "Scream, Popular Culture, and Feminism's Third Wave: I'm Not My Mother" and Irene Karras in "The Third Wave's Final Girl: Buffy the Vampire Slayer" suggest a link with third-wave feminism. Frances Early and Kathleen Kennedy in the introduction to Athena's Daughters: Television's New Women Warriors, discuss what they describe as a link between girl power and a "new" image of women warriors in popular culture.

=== Oxford English Dictionary ===
A 2001 update to the Oxford English Dictionary defined "girl power" as:

Power exercised by girls; spec. a self-reliant attitude among girls and young women manifested in ambition, assertiveness, and individualism. Although also used more widely (esp. as a slogan), the term has been particularly and repeatedly associated with popular music; most notably in the early 1990s with the briefly prominent "riot girl" movement in the United States (cf. RIOT GIRL n.); then, in the late 1990s, with the British all-female group The Spice Girls.

The dictionary further offers an example of this term by quoting from "Angel Delight", an article in the March 24, 2001, issue of Dreamwatch about the television series Dark Angel:

After the Sarah Connors and Ellen Ripleys of the 1980s, the 1990s weren't so kind to the superwoman format—Xena Warrior Princess excepted. But it's a new 2000 millennium now, and while Charlie's Angels and Crouching Tiger, Hidden Dragon are kicking up a storm on movie screens, it's been down to James Cameron to bring empowered female warriors back to television screens. And tellingly, Cameron has done it by mixing the sober feminism of his Terminator and Aliens characters with the sexed-up girl power of a Britney Spears concert. The result is Dark Angel.

== Criticism ==
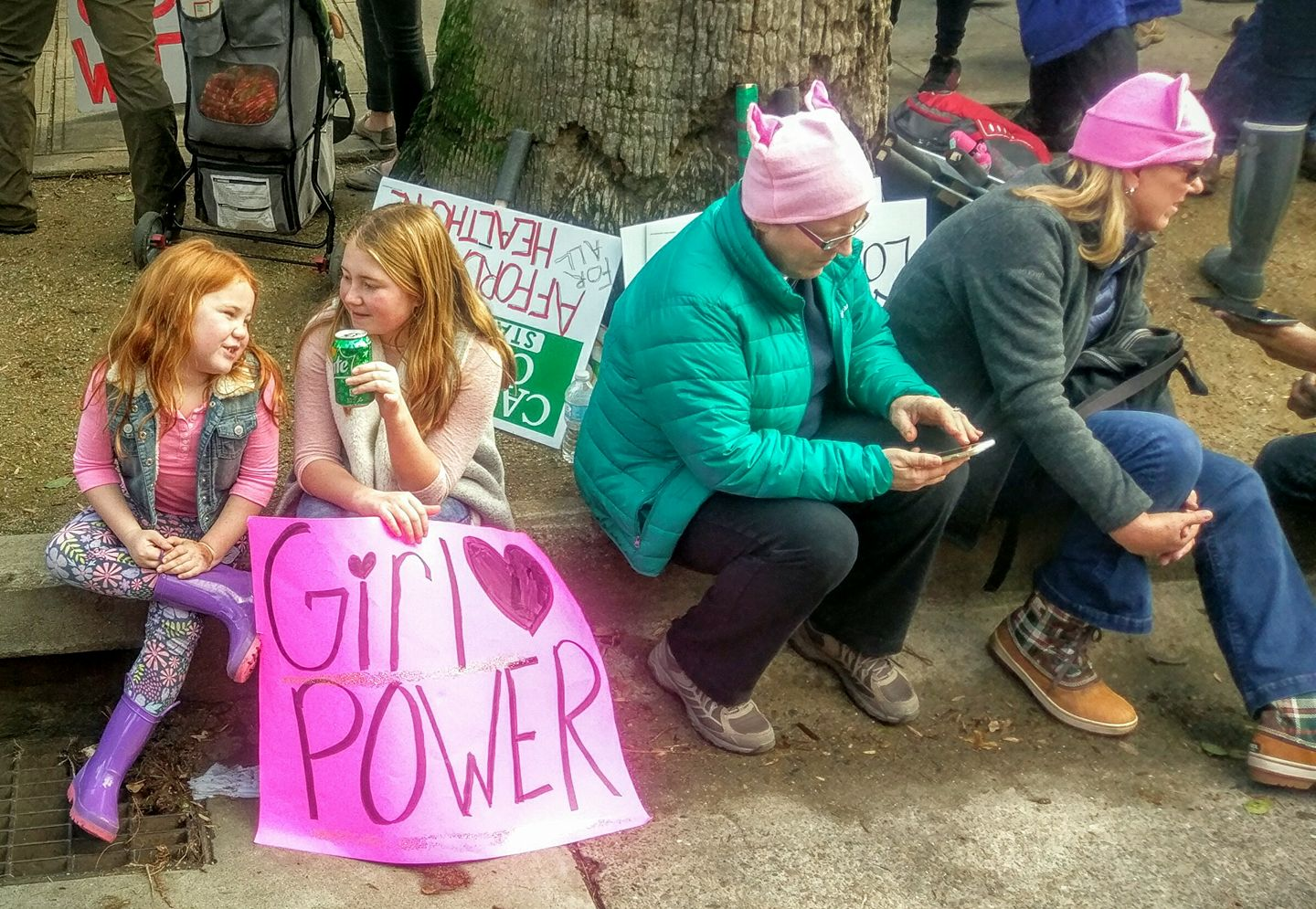
Girl Power slogan on display at a women's march in Sacramento, California

The communications scholar Debbie Ging was critical of the "girl power" ideals, and linked it to the sexualisation of younger children, girls in particular.

The sociologist Amy McClure warns against placing too much hope on girl power as an empowering concept. She says, "An ideology based on consumerism can never be a revolutionary social movement. The fact that it appears to be a revolutionary movement is a dangerous lie that not only marketers sell to us but that we often happily sell to ourselves." Rebecca Hains also criticized mainstream "girl power" for its commercial function, arguing in Women's Studies in Communication that it "undermines true work towards equality, serving corporate interests at the expense of girls' personal interests," and called it an "updated version of 'commodity feminism.'"

Despite the term's origins in Black Power and Black hip hop, Raisa Alvarado argues that the Girl Power movement "disproportionately centers white, middle and upper class girls." Further, Alvarado claims that "the ethos of girl power discourses, as propagated in popular culture... promote whiteness via neoliberal, postfeminist, and postrace representations of empowered girlhood." Young Femininity authors Sinikka Aapola, Marnina Gonick, Jo Campling, and Anita Harris note that the Girl Power movement "appropriat[es]... images and discourses of black women's strength, power and agency to serve a mainly white middle-class young women" agenda.

Media and toys can present a narrow definition of what it means to be a girl, such as Mattel's Barbie. The "I can be" Barbie embodied this concept of "girl power": that little girls can be anything they want when they grow up. Barbie has continued to stay relevant into the 2020s through the 2023 film Barbie starring Margot Robbie. Forbes has even placed Barbie on the 2023 Forbes Power Women List. Arguably, Barbie's image also presents narrow options with which girls can identify, limiting the potential of any "girl power"-themed line.

In addition to concerns about girl power's implications for girls, some critics questioned its use by women. For example, Hannah Jane Parkinson of The Guardian criticized the term "girl power" as something "young women [that] are feeling more confident about calling themselves feminists and standing up for principles of equality" hide behind. She denounced the phrase for including the word "girl", claiming it encouraged the application of the term "girl" to adult women.

== See also ==
- Corporate sociopolitical activism
- Purplewashing
- List of female action heroes
- International Day of the Girl Child
- Phallus-girl
- Post-feminism
- Slacktivism
- Women warriors in literature and culture
- Girl Heroes (2002)
- Women's rights
- Women's empowerment
- Wonder Women! The Untold Story of American Superheroines (2012)
- Xena: Warrior Princess in popular culture

== Bibliography ==
- Early, Frances H.; Kennedy, Kathleen (2003). Athena's Daughters: Television's New Women Warriors. Syracuse, New York: Syracuse Univ. Press. ISBN 9780815629689. Preview.
- Evans, Amanda; Brabazon, Tara (1998). "I'll never be your woman: the Spice Girls and new flavours of feminism". Social Alternatives. 17 (2): 39–42.
- Gateward, Frances; Pomerance, Murray, eds. (2002). Sugar, Spice, and Everything Nice: Cinemas of Girlhood. Detroit: Wayne State University Press. ISBN 9780814329184. Preview.
- Hains, Rebecca C. (2012). Growing Up With Girl Power: Girlhood On Screen and In Everyday Life. New York: Peter Lang Press. ISBN 978-1433111389.
- Helford, Elyce Rae (2000). Fantasy Girls: Gender in the New Universe of Science Fiction and Fantasy Television. Lanham, Maryland: Rowman & Littlefield. ISBN 9780847698356. Preview.
- Hopkins, Susan (2002). Girl Heroes: The New Force in Popular Culture. Australia: Pluto Press. ISBN 9781864031577
- Inness, Sherrie A., ed. (2004). Action Chicks: New Images of Tough Women in Popular Culture. New York: Palgrave Macmillan. ISBN 9781403963963.
- Inness, Sherrie A. (1999). Tough Girls: Women Warriors and Wonder Women in Popular Culture. Pennsylvania, Philadelphia: University of Pennsylvania Press. ISBN 9780812234664.
- Inness, Sherrie A., ed. (1997). Nancy Drew and company: culture, gender, and girls' series. Bowling Green, Ohio: Bowling Green State University Popular Press. ISBN 9780879727369. Preview.
- Karlyn, Kathleen Rowe (2003). "Scream, popular culture, and feminism's third wave: 'I'm Not My Mother'". Genders Journal: Presenting Innovative Work in the Arts, Humanities, and Social Sciences. 38. University of Colorado.
- Karras, Irene (March 2002). "The third wave's final girl: Buffy the Vampire Slayer". Thirdspace: A Journal of Feminist Theory & Culture. 1 (2). Simon Fraser University.
- Magoulick, Mary (October 2006). "Frustrating female heroism: mixed messages in Xena, Nikita, and Buffy". The Journal of Popular Culture. 39 (5): 729–755. doi:10.1111/j.1540-5931.2006.00326.x.
- Phoenix, Ann; Nairn, Agnes; Griffin, Christine; Wickes, Patricia G.; Croghan, Rosaleen; Hunter, Janine (2006), "Girly girls, tomboys and micro-waving Barbie: child and youth consumption and the disavowal of femininity", in Stevens, Lorna; Borgerson, Janet (eds.), GCB – Gender and Consumer Behavior Volume 8, vol. GCB-08, Edinburgh, Scotland: Association for Consumer Research (ACR), pp. 6–21, archived from the original on October 8, 2015. PDF.
- Tasker, Yvonne (2004). Action and Adventure Cinema. New York: Routledge. ISBN 9780415235075.
