= Mary Cross (writer) =

American professor, editor, writer and biographer

Mary Cross (born 1934) is an American professor, editor, writer and biographer. She has written several books including biographies of figures such as Henry James and Madonna. Her book Madonna: A Biography was reviewed by New York Post as "fast, accurate and concise", became widely quoted and translated. Cross is professor emerita of English at Fairleigh Dickinson University, and she has taught at the City University of New York and University of Delaware. Cross has a PhD from Rutgers University and a BA from the University of Michigan. As an editor, she publisher various works, including 100 People Who Changed 20th-Century America.

== Publications ==
- Cross, Mary (1987). Persuasive Business Writing: Creating Better Letters, Memos, Reports, and More. American Management Association. ISBN 978-0-8144-5898-3.
- Cross, Mary (1993). Henry James: The Contingencies of Style. Springer. ISBN 978-1-349-22661-0.
- Cross, Mary (1996-01-01). Advertising and Culture: Theoretical Perspectives. Praeger. ISBN 978-0-275-95351-5.
- Cross, Mary (2002-10-01). A Century of American Icons: 100 Products and Slogans from the 20th-Century Consumer Culture. ABC-CLIO, LLC. ISBN 978-0-313-36124-1.
- Cross, Mary (2007). Madonna: A Biography. Greenwood Publishing Group. ISBN 978-0-313-33811-3.
- Cross, Mary (2011-06-30). Bloggerati, Twitterati: How Blogs and Twitter are Transforming Popular Culture. ABC-CLIO. ISBN 978-0-313-38484-4.
- Cross, Mary (2013-01-07). 100 People Who Changed 20th-Century America [2 volumes]. ABC-CLIO. ISBN 978-1-61069-086-7.
- Cross, Mary (2017-09-30). The Emotional Life of Money: How Money Changes the Way We Think and Feel. ABC-CLIO. ISBN 978-1-4408-5054-7.
