= Alison Piepmeier =

Scholar and feminist

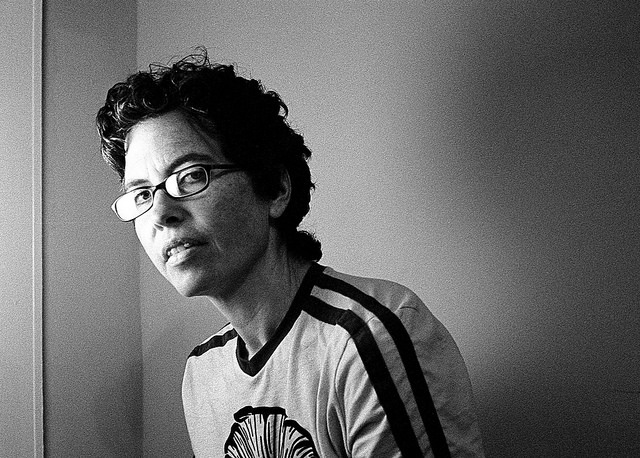
- Born: December 11, 1972; Cookeville, Tennessee, U.S.
- Died: August 12, 2016 (aged 43)
- Occupation: Professor

Academic background
- Education: Vanderbilt University

Academic work
- Discipline: Women's and Gender Studies
- Sub-discipline: English, Disability Studies
- Institutions: College of Charleston
- Website: http://alisonpiepmeier.blogspot.com

Alison Piepmeier (December 11, 1972 – August 12, 2016) was an American scholar and feminist, known for her book Girl Zines: Making Media, Doing Feminism. She was director of Women's and Gender Studies and associate professor of English at the College of Charleston.

== Education ==
Piepmeier was a third-generation graduate of Tennessee Technological University, having completed her bachelor's degree in 1994. She earned her Ph.D. in English from Vanderbilt University.

== Career and research ==
Following her Ph.D. studies, Piepmeier held the position of associate director of Vanderbilt's Women’s Studies Program. While there, she published the book Out in Public, which chronicles the lives of women who worked in public in the nineteenth century. In 2005, she moved to Charleston and became the first full-time director of the College of Charleston's Women's and Gender Studies program.

Piepmeier was known for her research on third wave feminist activism. Her 2009 book Girl Zines: Making Media, Doing Feminism was the first book-length academic study of zines and women as zine creators. She co-edited the 2003 anthology Catching a Wave: Reclaiming Feminism for the 21st Century, a collection which is frequently taught in women's studies courses.

In her work at the intersection of feminism and disability studies, Piepmeier explored how women make reproductive decisions when prenatal testing reveals their fetus has Down syndrome, and analyzed memoirs by parents of children with disabilities. In 2013 she presented at conferences for genetics counsellors and genetics educators, raising questions around the value of eradicating disability from the human population.

In addition to her academic writing, she contributed a column for the Charleston City Paper and had written editorials for The New York Times Motherlode blog. In these writings Piepmeier covered topics such as same-sex parents, women's rights, raising disabled children and the Black Lives Matter movement. She also wrote about personal experiences, such as her and her husband's decision to decline pre-natal foetal testing during her pregnancy in 2012, and her fight against cancer from 2015.

Piepmeier was President of the Southeastern Women's Studies Association (SEWSA) from 2006 to 2008 and was a member of the Governing Council of the National Women's Studies Association (NWSA).

== Recognition and honors ==
In 2014, she was named as one of the 50 Most Progressive people in Charleston by online magazine Charlie. In 2014, she also gained attention for leading the efforts to host performances of the musical Fun Home on the campus of the College of Charleston.

In September 2016, the Southeastern Women's Studies Association (SEWSA) established a $500 "Outstanding Student Award" in Piepmeier's honor, and in December 2016, the NWSA established the $1,000 Alison Piepmeier Book Prize.

== Death ==
On August 12, 2016, Piepmeier died from brain cancer after a seven-year battle with the disease in Charleston, South Carolina, U.S. Three weeks before her death, Piepmeier wrote a farewell column in the Charleston City Paper. The column was picked up by mainstream outlets including Us Weekly and ABC News.

== Selected publications ==
- Catching a Wave: Reclaiming Feminism for the Twenty-First Century, co-edited with Rory Cooke Dicker, 2003, Northeastern University Press
- Out in Public: Configurations of Women’s Bodies in Nineteenth-Century America, 2004, University of North Carolina Press
- Girl Zines: Making Media, Doing Feminism, 2009, New York University Press
- Unexpected: Parenting, Prenatal Testing, and Down Syndrome with George Estreich and Rachel Adams, published posthumously in 2020 by New York University Press.
