= Kyra Gaunt =

American ethnomusicologist, activist and academic

Kyra Danielle Gaunt
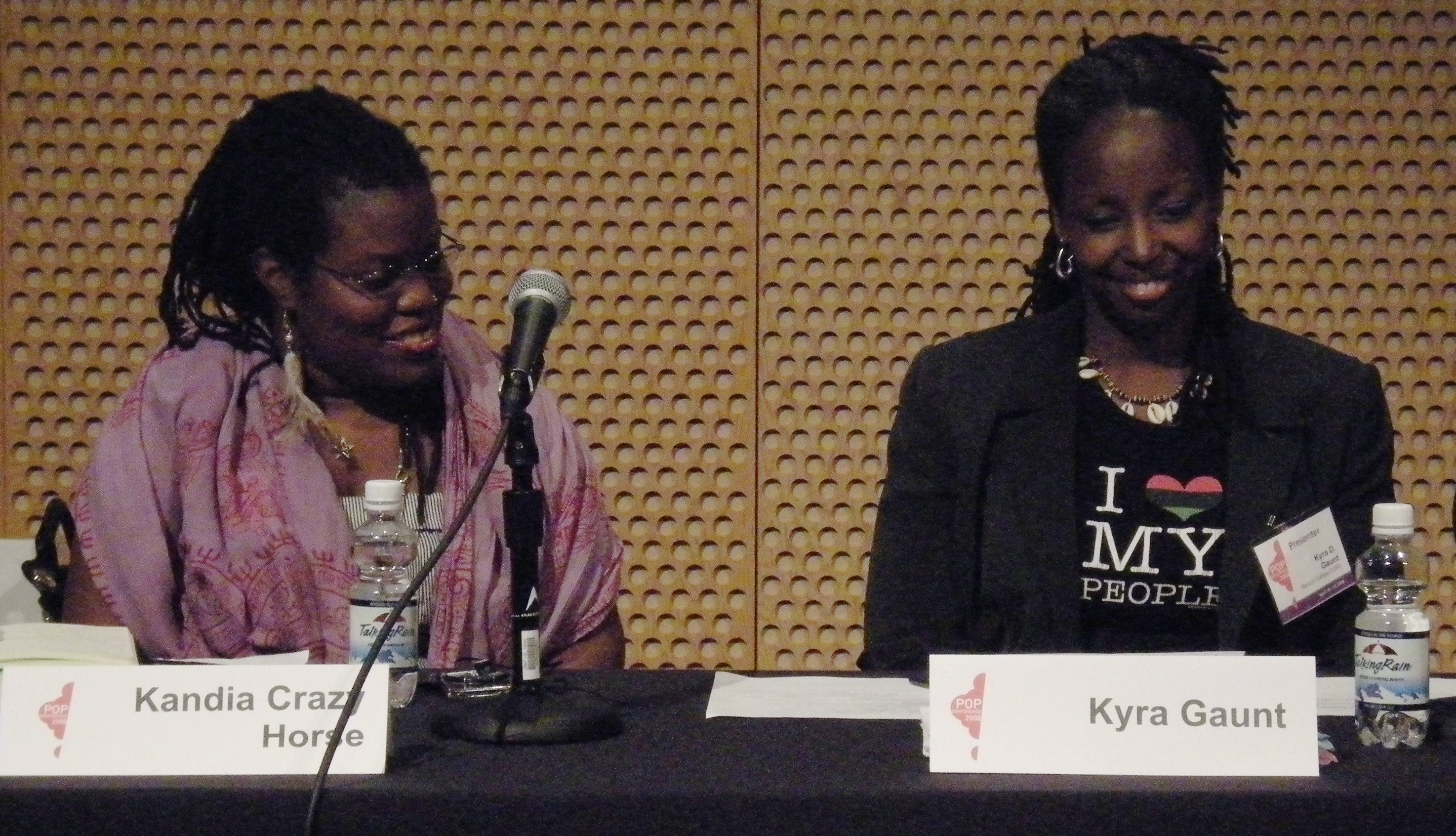
- Crazy Horse and Gaunt on a panel at the 2008 EMP Pop Conf

Academic background
- Education: SUNY Binghamton; The American University
- Alma mater: University of Michigan in Ann Arbor
- Influences: George Shirley Judith Becker Robin Kelley

Academic work
- Discipline: Ethnomusicologist, social media researcher
- Notable works: The Games Black Girls Play: Learning the Ropes from Double-Dutch to Hip-Hop

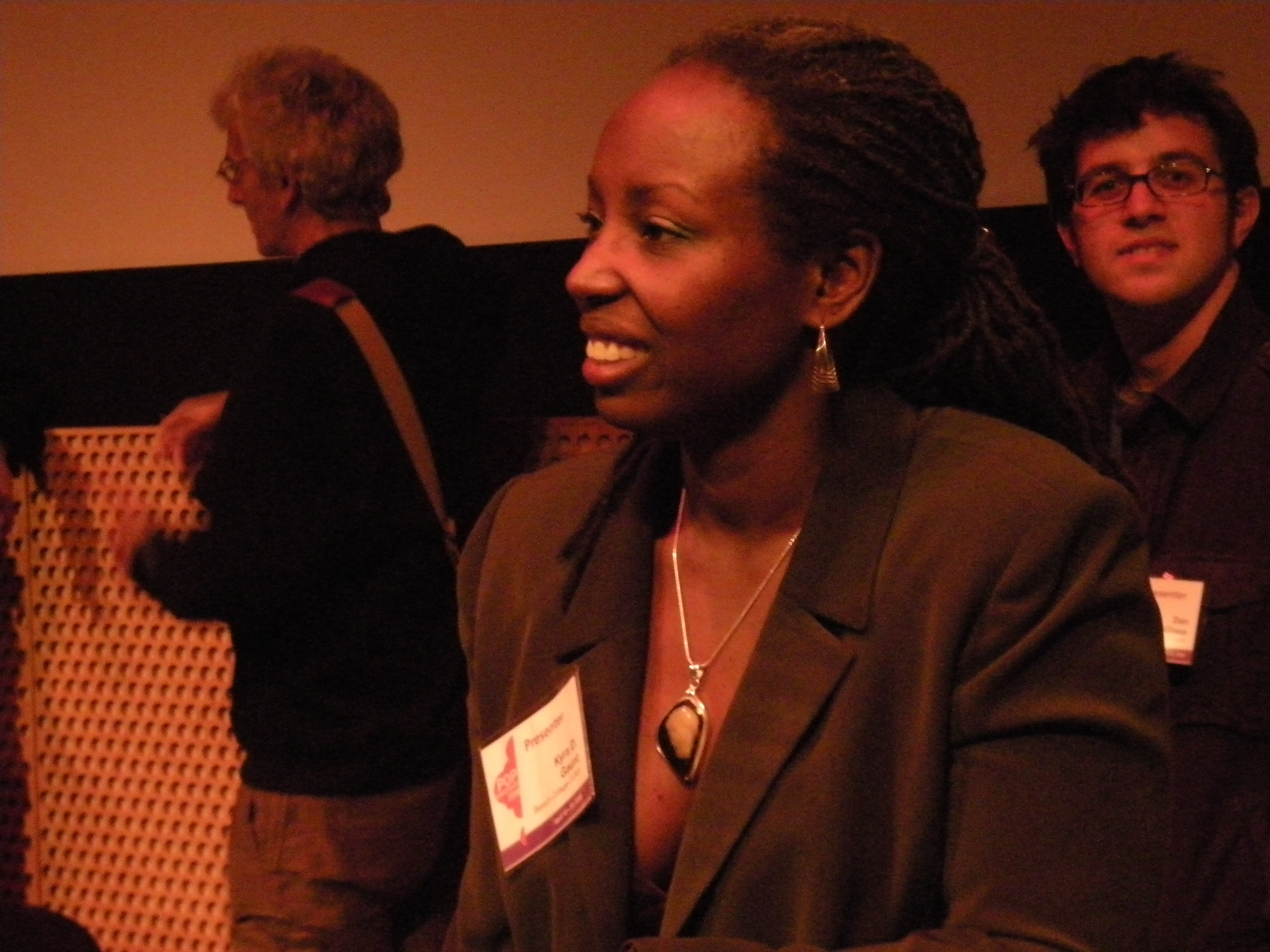
Gaunt, attending the 2008 Pop Conference

Kyra Danielle Gaunt is an African American ethnomusicologist, Black girlhood studies advocate, social media researcher, feminist performance artist, and professor at the University at Albany in New York State. Gaunt's research focuses on the hidden musicianship of black girls' musical play at the intersections of race, racism, gender, heterosexism, misogynoir, age, and the kinetic-orality of the female body in the age of hip-hop. Her current research focuses on "the unintended consequences of gender, race, and technology from YouTube to Wikipedia."

She is a native of the Lincoln Park neighborhood in Rockville, Maryland, that began as a segregated Black community founded in 1891. Notable abolitionist author Josiah Henson was enslaved in Rockville and there is some evidence that religious leader Father Divine may have been born there. Gaunt's maternal great-great-grandmother Annie Ford and great-great-grandfather Sheridan Ford escaped his enslavement in Portsmouth, Virginia on the U.G.G.R. (the Underground Railroad) finding freedom in Springfield, Massachusetts in the mid-1850s. She currently resides in Albany, New York.

== Education ==
Gaunt attended the School of Music at the University of Michigan in Ann Arbor from 1988-1997, where she earned a Ph.D. in Musicology with a specialization in ethnomusicology. Judith Becker chair her dissertation committee with Janet Hart, Steven Whiting, James Dapogny, and Robin D. G. Kelley as her committee members. She also studied classical voice with operatic tenor George Shirley. She also holds a master's and associate degree in voice from SUNY Binghamton and The American University, respectively.

== Career ==
Gaunt began working in higher education as a professor of hip-hop at the University of Virginia in 1996. She held appointments at NYU, Baruch College and Hunter College in the CUNY system, and is currently a professor at University at Albany, SUNY, where she teaches classes on topics such as music, gender sexuality, and other topics in her research area. Gaunt has spoken about her research and the concepts that surround it in multiple platforms that include a 2018 appearance at Harvard Business School's Gender and Work Symposium, where she spoke about her research Race, Work and Leadership: Learning from and about Black experience. Her research focuses on the musical play of black girls at the "intersections of race, gender, and the body in the age of hip-hop" and the "critical study of the unintended consequences of race, gender, and technology from YouTube to Wikipedia." Gaunt has also edited Wikipedia since 2007 and hosts WikiEdu courses.

According to Gaunt, double-dutch was innovated by young African American girls in urban areas after World War II. In her book, The Games Black Girls Play: Learning the Ropes from Double-Dutch to Hip-Hop, Gaunt invites readers to "broaden their interpretation of black musical experience" to include race, gender and body, and the experience of double dutch can be a path to understanding hip hop culture through a black girl's perspective . Gaunt wrote that double-dutch was an essential part of black girl culture in the U.S.: "If double-dutch dies in neighborhoods, that's bad news for black culture". As the sport became incorporated into public schools, "casual interest in neighborhoods" saw a decline.

Gaunt also compares the sport of double dutch to hip hop, citing "hip and pelvic thrusts" and "rhythmic complexity" as elements that are vital to both. She emphasizes double-dutch is a way of "experiencing black feminism" through its connection to staying on time to keep the movements going.

Gaunt is also a vocalist and singer-songwriter. She has performed her one-woman show Education, Liberation at University at Albany's Performing Arts Center and self produced an album of original R&B/jazz oriented songs (co-written with Tomas Doncker) titled Be the True Revolution (2007).

== Awards, honors, and projects ==
In 2007 Kyra Gaunt published The Games Black Girls Play: Learning the Ropes from Double-Dutch to Hip-Hop. Her book was awarded the distinguished Alan Merriam Book Prize presented by the Society for Ethnomusicology. It was also nominated as a PEN/Beyond the Margins Book Award finalist. It inspired a work by fellow TED Fellow Camille A. Brown, BLACK GIRL: Linguistic Play, which was nominated for a 2016 Bessie Award for Outstanding Production. Among other significant publications, her peer-reviewed articles appear in Musical Quarterly, Parcours anthropologiques, and the Journal for Popular Music Studies.

In 2009 Gaunt was honored as one of the inaugural TED Fellows. Gaunt spoke at the 2015 TEDx East in New York City about the challenges and misconceptions behind the net worth and value of young black and African American girls who twerk on YouTube. In 2018, Kyra appeared in a video for the TED Design series Small Thing, Big Idea, where she used her research to discuss how the jump rope got its rhythm.

Gaunt was featured in a short documentary ad for the Nokia Connecting People campaign that showed the impact of TED Fellows around the world. The mini-doc featured an project called One Laptop Per Child, designed to encourage access to learning in developing countries by providing an Internet-connected laptop to every school-age child. Dr. Gaunt's scholarship has been funded by the Mellon Foundation, the National Endowment for the Humanities, the Ford Foundation and the Ms. Foundation for Women. Her exploration centers around the basic examination and concealed musicianship in dark young ladies' melodic play at the crossing points of race, sexual orientation, and the body in the time of hip-bounce.

In 2019, Gaunt was invited to speak at the University of Miami to present her research on the racial oppression and sexploitation of young, black girls who appear in YouTube videos.

== Publications ==
Gaunt has published many works during her career. Her publications include:

=== Books ===
- The Games Black Girls Play: Learning the Ropes from Double-Dutch to Hip-Hop (2006, NYU Press)

=== Chapters, volumes, and anthologies ===
- "Dancin' in the Streets to a Black Girl's Beat: Music, Gender and the "Ins and Outs" of Double-Dutch", in Generations of Youth: Youth Cultures and History in Twentieth-Century America (1998, pages 272-292, NYU Press)
- "Translating Double-Dutch to Hip-Hop: The Musical Vernacular of Black Girls' Play", in That's the Joint! The Hip-Hop Studies Reader (2004, pages 251-263, Routledge)
- "‘One Time 4 Your Mind’: Embedding Nas and Hip-Hop into a Gendered State of Mind", Born to Use Mics: Reading Nas’s “Illmatic,” (2010, pp. 151–78, 2010, Basic Civitas Books)
- ""Double Forces Has Got the Beat": Reclaiming Girls' Music in the Sport of Double-Dutch", in The Girls' History and Culture Reader: The Twentieth Century (2011, pp. 279–299, University of Illinois Press)
- "Forward: Truly Professin' Hip-Hop and Black Girl 'Hood", in Wish to Live: A Hip Hop Feminist Pedagogy Reader (2012, pp ix-xv, Peter Lang)
- "YouTube, bad bitches and an MIC (mom-in-chief): On the digital seduction of Black girls in participatory hip-hop spaces", Remixing Change: Hip Hop & Obama, A Critical Reader (Oxford UP, 2015)
- "Truly Professin' Hip-hop--The Rewind (1996): Makin' Black Girls Embodied Musical Play the Teacher", in Black Feminism in Education (2015, pp 103–118, Peter Lang)
- "YouTube, Twerking, and You: Context Collapse and the Handheld Copresence of Black Girls and Miley Cyrus", in Voicing Girlhood in Popular Music (2016, pages 218-242, Routledge)
- "YouTube, Twerking, and You", in Voicing Girlhood in Popular Music: Performance, Authority, Authenticity (2016, Routledge)

=== Select journal articles ===
- Gaunt, Kyra D. (1995), "African American Women Between Hopscotch and Hip-Hop: "Must Be the Music (That's Turnin' Me On)"", Feminism, Multiculturalism, and the Media: Global Diversities, SAGE Publications, Inc., pp. 277–308, doi:10.4135/9781483345383.n13, ISBN 9780803957756
- "The veneration of James Brown and George Clinton in hip-hop music: Is it live! Or is it re-memory", Popular Music: Style and Identity, pp. 117–122, 1995.
- "Wade in the Water: African American Sacred Music Traditions", Yearbook for Traditional Music 30:189, January 1998.
- "Plenty of Good Women Dancers: African American Women Hoofers from Philadelphia", Ethnomusicology 44:2, University of Illinois Press, pp. 359–361, 2000.
- "Music and the Racial Imagination", Ethnomusicology 48:1, University of Illinois Press, pp. 127–131, 2004.
- "Girls’ Game-Songs and Hip-Hop: Music Between the Sexes", Parcours anthropologiques 8, CREA, pp. 97–128, 2012.
- "The Two O'Clock Vibe": Embodying the Jam of Musical Blackness in and out of Its Everyday Context", Musical Quarterly 86:3, Macmillan, pp. 372–397, Autumn 2002.
- "Got Rhythm?: difficult encounters in theory and practice and other participatory discrepancies in music", City & Society 14:1, Blackwell Publishing, pp. 119–140, 2002.
- "Roundtable: VH1's (White) Rapper Show: Intrusions, Sightlines, and Authority", Journal of Popular Music Studies 20:1, Blackwell Publishing, pp 44–78, 2008. (with Cheryl L Keyes, Timothy R Mangin, Wayne Marshall, Joe Schloss)
- "Introduction: APES**T", Journal of Popular Music Studies 30:4, UoC Press Journals, 2018. (With Carol Vernallis, Jason King, Maeve Sterbenz, Gabriel Ellis, Gabrielle Lochard, Daniel Oore, Eric Lyon, Dale Chapman)
- "The Disclosure, Disconnect, and Digital Sexploitation of Tween Girls' Aspirational YouTube Videos", Journal of Black Sexuality and Relationships 5:1, UoN Press, pp 91–132, 2018.
