= Berrin Yanıkkaya =

Turkish academic

- Education: Mimar Sinan Fine Arts University
- Scientific career
- Thesis: Women voices in the city women's self-expression through cultural products in istanbul after 1990s (rock music as a sample case)

Berrin Yanıkkaya is a full professor at the Yeditepe University in Turkey.

== Academic career ==
After a 2004 PhD at titled 'Women voices in the city women's self-expression through cultural products in istanbul after 1990s (rock music as a sample case)' at the Mimar Sinan Fine Arts University (Turkish: Mimar Sinan Güzel Sanatlar Üniversitesi; abbreviated MSGSÜ), she worked as professor at Yeditepe University in Turkey before moving to the Auckland University of Technology as full professor. She left AUT at the end of 2018.

== Selected works ==
- Yanıkkaya, Berrin. "Gündelik hayatın suretinde: öteki korkusu, görsel şiddet ve medya." The representation of daily life: the fear of the others, visual violence and the media]. In B. Çoban (Ed.), Medya, Milliyetçilik, Şiddet [Media, Nationalism, Violence]. Istanbul: Su (2009).
- Kejanlıoğlu, D. Beybin, Barış Çoban, Berrin Yanıkkaya, and M. Emre Köksalan. "The user as producer in alternative media? The case of the Independent Communication Network (BIA)." Communications 37, no. 3 (2012): 275–296.
- Yanıkkaya, Berrin (2009). Medya Milliyetçilik Şiddet. İstanbul: Su Yayınevi. ISBN 978-9756709719.
- Yanıkkaya, Berrin & Çoban, Barış. (2014). Kendi medyanı yarat; Alternatif medya, kavramlar, tartışmalar, örnekler. İstanbul: Kalkedon Yayınları. ISBN 978-6054979028.
