= Sara Mills (linguist) =

English linguist

Sara Mills (b. 1954) is Emeritus Professor in Linguistics at Sheffield Hallam University, England. Her linguistic interests are the comparison of linguistic forms of expression in different languages, particularly in reference to politeness. Her other major work area is feminism.

She has published many books and articles on politeness and discursive approaches to the analysis of politeness. She has also published on feminist linguistic theory.

== Books ==
- 1991: Discourses of Difference: An Analysis of Women's Travel Writing and Colonialism , Routledge, ISBN 0415046297,
  Mills argues that British women travelers "were unable to adopt the imperial voice with the ease with which the male writers did".
- 1997, 2004: Discourse (The New Critical Idiom Series, Routledge)
  Analyzes the term 'discourse' and examines theoretical assumptions surrounding it, discusses the works of various discourse theoretists
  - 1997: ISBN 041511053X
  - 2004: ISBN 0415290139
- 2003: Gender and Politeness ISBN 9780521009195
  - "Mills argues that, although women speakers, drawing on stereotypes of femininity, can appear to be acting more politely than men, there are many circumstances where women will act as "impolitely" as men." ... "Focuses on the conversational strategies used to avoid giving offence and shows how they relate to questions of gender"
- 2003: Michel Foucault, (Critical Thinkers Series, Routledge)
- 2003: (co-edited with Reina Lewis) Feminist Post-Colonial Theory: A Reader
- 2005: Gender and Colonial Space, Manchester University Press
- 2008: Language and Sexism
- 2009: (with Dániel Z. Kádár) Ch. 2. "Politeness and Culture", In: Politeness in East Asia, Cambridge University Press
- 2011: (with Louise Mullany), Language Gender and Feminism
- 2012: Gender Matters: Feminist Linguistic Analysis, ISBN 1845534964
- 2017: English Politeness and Class, ISBN 1108340415
