= Women's Studies in Communication =

- Discipline: Feminism
- Language: English

Publication details
- Publisher: Taylor & Francis
- Frequency: Triannual

Standard abbreviations
- ISO 4: Women's Stud. Commun.

Indexing
- ISSN: 0749-1409 (print); 2152-999X (web)

Links
- Journal homepage

Women's Studies in Communication is a feminist journal. It was first published in 1977 and is the journal of the Organization for Research on Women and Communication. It is published by Taylor & Francis. From 2014 until 2017, Joan Faber McAlister worked as the journal's editor-in-chief. Claire Sisco King of Vanderbilt University took over and worked as the editor from 2022 to 2025. The journal covers topics including gender and race, ethnicity, nationality, sexuality, and class. Radhika Gajjala of Bowling Green State University is the current editor.
