= Berghahn Books =

New York-based academic publisher

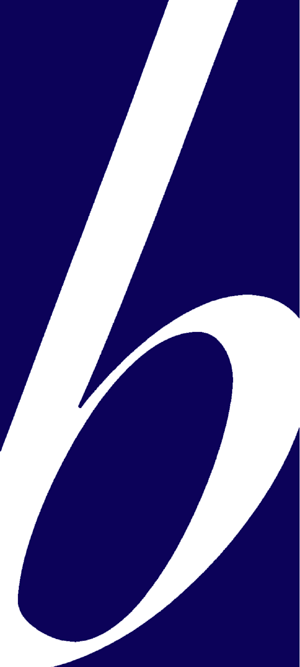
- Founded: 1994
- Founder: Marion Berghahn
- Country of origin: United States
- Headquarters location: New York City
- Distribution: Turpin Distribution (United Kingdom, Republic of Ireland, South Africa, India); Ingram Academic (United States, Australia, New Zealand)
- Publication types: Books, Academic journals
- Official website: www.berghahnbooks.com

Berghahn Books is a New York- and Oxford-based publisher of scholarly books and academic journals in the humanities and social sciences, with a special focus on social and cultural anthropology, European history, politics, and film and media studies. It was founded in 1994 by Marion Berghahn.

== Books division ==
Every year, Berghahn Books publishes approximately 140 new titles and around 80 paperback editions paperback editions and has a backlist of nearly 2,500 titles in print. New titles are published in both print and online, with the select digitization of the backlist currently being undertaken as part of the Berghahn Books Online platform. Many Berghahn titles have been reviewed on Choice.

== Journals division ==
Berghahn Journals currently publishes over 40 journals in those social science and humanities fields that complement its books list. This includes an annual series, Advances in Research, launched in 2013. Its journals have been available online since 2001. Berghahn Journals was awarded the AAP PROSE Award for Best New Journal in the Social Sciences and Humanities two years in a row: in 2009 for Girlhood Studies and in 2008 for Projections. Girlhood Studies was also the recipient of the Highly Commended Certificate for the 2010 ALPSP Best New Journal Award.

As of 2019, Berghahn Books joined Annual Reviews in releasing part of its journal content under the Subscribe to Open (S2O) initiative. In 2019 Berghahn offered 13 titles in anthropology as possible S2O candidates, all of which were released as open content in 2020. As of June 3, 2021, Berghahn Journals announced that Social Anthropology (Anthropologie Sociale), the journal of the European Association of Social Anthropologists (EASA) would become part of their open-access set of anthropology journals, starting with Volume 30 in 2022. EASA members "voted overwhelmingly" to leave their current publishers, Wiley, and "to take our journal Open Access in a way that is sustainable and equitable."

== See also ==
- Journals published by Berghahn
