= Nudity and sexuality =

Aspect of sociology

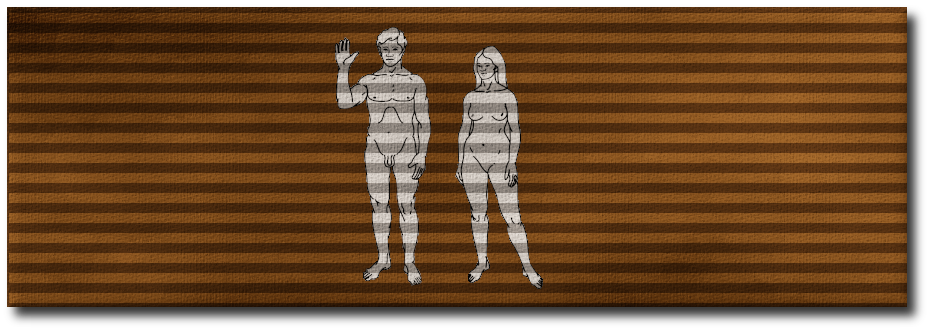
A ribbon for the Nudity Barnstar.

The relationship between nudity and sexuality is heavily affected by context and cultural perceptions. Nudity is not necessarily sexual in nature, but is closely tied to human sexuality.

== Background ==
=== Nudity ===
Nudity is one of the physiological characteristics of humans, who alone among primates evolved to be effectively hairless. Human sexuality includes the physiological, psychological, and social aspects of sexual feelings and behaviors.

In many societies, a strong link between nudity and sexuality is taken for granted. Other societies maintain their traditional practices of being completely or partially naked in social as well as private situations, such as going to a beach or spa. The meaning of nudity and sexuality remains ambivalent, often leading to cultural misunderstandings and psychological problems.

=== Sexualization ===
The American Psychological Association (APA) defines sexualization as limiting a person's value to sexual appeal to the exclusion of other characteristics, and equating physical attractiveness with being sexual. A person may also be sexually objectified, made into an object for others' sexual use, rather than seen as a person with the capacity for independent action and decision making; or sexuality is inappropriately imposed upon a person. Being sexualized is particularly damaging to young people who are in the process of developing their own self-image. Girls may have sexualized expectations imposed upon them, or internalize norms that lead to self-sexualization. Sexualization of girls includes both age-inappropriate "sexy" attire for girls, and adult models dressing as girls. In movies and television, women are shown nude much more frequently than men, and generally in the context of sexual behavior.

Some see the APA position as viewing sexual images as uniformly negative, and overestimating the influence of these images on young people by assuming that exposure leads directly to negative effects, as if it were a disease. Studies also fail to address the effect of sexual images on boys which influences how they view their own masculinity and appropriate sexual relationships.

While there has been considerable media and political discussion of sexualization, there has been little psychological research on what effect media images actually have on the well-being of young people, for example how and to what degree sexual objectification is internalized, becoming self-evaluation. In interviews with Dutch pre-teens, the effects are complicated given the general liberal attitudes toward sexuality, including the legalization of prostitution, which is highly visible.

Researchers see the cultural force of commodification (or "pornification") as resulting in the sexualization of athletic bodies, negating the naturalness and beauty of nudity. This is in contrast to the sacredness of the nude athlete in the ancient world, particularly Greece – and the aesthetic appreciation of the nude in art.

== Sexual response to social nudity ==
The link between the nude body and a sexual response is reflected in the legal prohibition of indecent exposure in the majority of societies.

Worldwide, some societies recognize certain places and activities that, although public, are appropriate for partial or complete nudity. These include societies that maintain traditional norms regarding nudity, as well as modern societies that have large numbers of people who have adopted naturism in recreational activities. Naturists typically adopt a number of behaviors, such as refraining from touch, in order to avoid sexual responses while participating in nude activities. Many nude beaches serve as an example of this.

Studies have shown that biologically, humans are disposed to react to nudity more than any other presentation of bodies. This biological reaction includes sexual arousal, although sexuality presents and is wired differently between sexes. Because of this, there is often a separation or focus on one group's perspective of sexuality and less of an emphasis on another's; ideas can become skewed. There are also cultural differences on nudity and sexuality that often come from their pasts, religious views, or geographical region.

=== Naturism and sex ===
Some naturists do not maintain this non-sexual atmosphere. In a 1991 article in Off Our Backs, Nina Silver presents an account of mainstream sexual culture's intrusion into some American naturist groups. Nudist resorts may attract misogynists or pedophiles who are not always dealt with properly, and some resorts may cater to "swingers" or have sexually provocative events to generate revenue or attract members.

== Nudity movements ==
In many societies, the breast continues to be associated with both nurturing babies and sexuality. The "topfreedom" movement promotes equal rights for women to be naked above the waist in public under the same circumstances that are considered socially acceptable for men to do so.

Breastfeeding in public is forbidden in some jurisdictions, not regulated in others, and protected as a legal right in still others. Where public breastfeeding is a legal right, some mothers may be reluctant to breastfeed, and some people may object to the practice.

== Psychological disorders of bodily display ==
Exhibitionistic disorder is a condition marked by the urge, fantasy, or act of exposing one's genitals to non-consenting people, particularly strangers; and voyeuristic disorder is a sexual interest in, or practice of, spying on people engaged in intimate behaviors like undressing or sexual activity. While similar terms may be used loosely to refer to everyday activity, these feelings and behaviors are indicative of a mental disorder only if they interfere with normal functioning or well-being, or involve causing discomfort or alarm to others. Much rarer is gymnophobia, an abnormal and persistent fear of nudity.

== See also ==
- Nudity in film
- Sex in film

== Sources ==
=== Books ===
- Bancroft, John (2003). Sexual Development in Childhood. Indiana University Press. ISBN 978-0-253-34243-0.
- Barcan, Ruth (2004a). Nudity: A Cultural Anatomy. Berg Publishers. ISBN 1-85973-872-9.
- Bonner, Barbara L. (1999). "When does sexual play suggest a problem?". In Dubowitz, Howard; Depanfilis, Diane (eds.). Handbook for Child Protection Practice. Sage Publications. ISBN 978-0-7619-1371-9.
- Bullough, Vern L.; Bullough, Bonnie (2014). Human Sexuality: An Encyclopedia. Routledge. p. 449. ISBN 978-1-135-82509-6.
- Carr-Gomm, Philip (2010). A Brief History of Nakedness. London, UK: Reaktion Books, Limited. ISBN 978-1-86189-729-9.
- Goldman, Leslie (2007). Locker Room Diaries: The Naked Truth about Women, Body Image, and Re-imagining the "Perfect" Body. Cambridge, MA: Da Capo Press. ISBN 978-6-61-278860-4.
- Gordon, Betty N.; Schroeder, Carolyn S. (1995). Sexuality: A Developmental Approach to Problems. Springer. ISBN 978-0-306-45040-2.
- Górnicka, Barbara (2016). "From Lewd to Nude: Becoming a Naturist". Nakedness, Shame, and Embarrassment. Figurationen. Schriften zur Zivilisations und Prozesstheorie. Vol. 12. Wiesbaden: Springer VS.
- Higonnet, Anne (1998). Pictures of Innocence – The History and Crisis of Ideal Childhood. New York: Thames & Hudson. ISBN 978-0-500-28048-5. OL 705008M.
- Jordan, Tim; Pile, Steve, eds. (2003). Social Change. Wiley. ISBN 978-0-631-23312-1.
- Miles, Margaret R.; Lyon, Vanessa (2008). A Complex Delight: The Secularization of the Breast, 1350-1750. University of California Press. ISBN 978-0-520-25348-3.
- Toepfer, Karl Eric (1997). Empire of Ecstasy: Nudity and Movement in German Body Culture, 1910-1935. University of California Press. ISBN 978-0-520-91827-6.
- Thomason, Krista K. (2018). Naked: The Dark Side of Shame and Moral Life. New York: Oxford University Press. doi:10.1093/oso/9780190843274.003.0007.
- Zurbriggen, Eileen L.; Collins, Rebecca L.; Lamb, Sharon; Roberts, Tomi-Ann; Tolman, Deborah L.; Ward, L. Monique; Blake, Jeanne (2007). Report of the APA Task Force on the Sexualization of Girls (PDF). Washington, D.C.: American Psychological Association. OCLC 123130352.

=== Journal articles ===
- Allen, Katherine R.; Gary, Emily A.; Lavender-Stott, Erin S.; Kaestle, Christine E. (2018). "'I Walked in on Them': Young Adults' Childhood Perceptions of Sex and Nudity in Family and Public Contexts". Journal of Family Issues. 39 (15): 3804–3831. doi:10.1177/0192513X18793923. S2CID 149499290.
- Allen, Louisa (2006). "'Looking at the Real Thing': Young Men, Pornography, and Sexuality Education". Discourse: Studies in the Cultural Politics of Education. 27 (1): 69–83. doi:10.1080/01596300500510302. S2CID 143453096.
- Barcan, Ruth (2001). "The Moral Bath of Bodily Unconsciousness: Female Nudism, Bodily Exposure and the Gaze". Continuum. 15 (3): 303–317. doi:10.1080/10304310120086795. S2CID 145127932.
- Barcan, Ruth (2004b). "Regaining what Mankind has Lost through Civilisation: Early Nudism and Ambivalent Moderns". Fashion Theory. 8 (1): 63–82. doi:10.2752/136270404778051870. S2CID 194179019.
- Cover, Rob (2003-09-01). "The Naked Subject: Nudity, Context and Sexualization in Contemporary Culture". Body & Society. 9 (3): 53–72. doi:10.1177/1357034X030093004. ISSN 1357-034X. S2CID 143857816.
- Duits, Linda; van Zoonen, Liesbet (2011). "Coming to Terms with Sexualization". European Journal of Cultural Studies. 14 (5): 491–506. doi:10.1177/1367549411412201. S2CID 145405676.
- Eck, Beth A. (December 2001). "Nudity and Framing: Classifying Art, Pornography, Information, and Ambiguity". Sociological Forum. 16 (4). Springer: 603–632. doi:10.1023/A:1012862311849. JSTOR 684826. S2CID 143370129.
- Emmerink, Peggy M. J.; van den Eijnden1, Regina J. J. M.; Vanwesenbeeck, Ine; ter Bogt, Tom F. M. (2016). "The Relationship Between Endorsement of the Sexual Double Standard and Sexual Cognitions and Emotions". Sex Roles. 75 (7–8). New York: 363–76. doi:10.1007/s11199-016-0616-z. PMC 5023751. PMID 27688527.
- Frydendal, Stine; Thing, Lone Friis (2020). "A Shameful Affair? A Figurational Study of the Change Room and Showering Culture Connected to Physical Education in Danish Upper Secondary Schools". Sport, Education and Society. 25 (2): 161–72. doi:10.1080/13573322.2018.1564654. S2CID 149633742.
- Harper, Kyle (2012). "Porneia: The Making of a Christian Sexual Norm". Journal of Biblical Literature. 131 (2): 363–83. doi:10.2307/23488230. JSTOR 23488230. S2CID 142975618.
- Jensen, Robin (2004). "Topfreedom: A rhetorical analysis of the debate with a bust". Women and Language. 27 (1). Urbana: 68–69.
- Jirasek, Ivo; Kohe, Geoffery Zain; Hurych, Emanuel (2013). "Reimagining Athletic Nudity: The Sexualization of Sport as a Sign of a 'Porno-Ization' of Culture". Sport in Society. 16 (6): 721–734. doi:10.1080/17430437.2012.753525.
- Lerum, Kari; Dworkin, Shari L. (2009). "'Bad Girls Rule': An Interdisciplinary Feminist Commentary on the Report of the APA Task Force on the Sexualization of Girls". The Journal of Sex Research. 46 (4): 250–263. doi:10.1080/00224490903079542. PMID 19657944. S2CID 24616468.
- Miller, Barry (2016). "On the Loss of Nudity in the Men's Locker Room". Psychological Perspectives. 59 (1): 93–108. doi:10.1080/00332925.2016.1134213. S2CID 147364697.
- Okami, Paul (1995). "Childhood exposure to parental nudity, parent-child co-sleeping, and "primal scenes": A review of clinical opinion and empirical evidence". Journal of Sex Research. 32 (1): 51–63. doi:10.1080/00224499509551774. ISSN 0022-4499.
- Okami, Paul; Olmstead, Richard; Abramson, Paul R.; Pendleton, Laura (1998). "Early Childhood Exposure to Parental Nudity and Scenes of Parental Sexuality ('Primal Scenes'): An 18-Year Longitudinal Study of Outcome". Archives of Sexual Behavior. 27 (4): 361–384. doi:10.1023/A:1018736109563. ISSN 0004-0002. PMID 9681119. S2CID 21852539.
- Prause, Nicole; Park, Jaymie; Leung, Shannon; Miller, Geoffrey (2015). "Women's Preferences for Penis Size: A New Research Method Using Selection among 3D Models". PLOS ONE. 10 (9) e0133079. Bibcode:2015PLoSO..1033079P. doi:10.1371/journal.pone.0133079. PMC 4558040. PMID 26332467.
- Shantz, Mary-Ann (2017). "'Nudists at Heart': Children's Nature and Child Psychology in the Postwar Canadian Nudist Movement". Journal of the History of Childhood and Youth. 10 (2). Baltimore: John Hopkin's University Press: 228–247. doi:10.1353/hcy.2017.0026. S2CID 148668825. ProQuest 1901236165.
- Shrum, Wesley; Kilburn, John (1996). "Ritual Disrobement at Mardi Gras: Ceremonial Exchange and Moral Order". Social Forces. 75 (2): 423–58. doi:10.2307/2580408. JSTOR 2580408.
- Silver, Nina (1991). "The Shame of Being Naked". Off Our Backs. 21 (8): 6–7. JSTOR 20833713.
- Smith, H. W. (1980-09-01). "A Modest Test of Cross-Cultural Differences in Sexual Modesty, Embarrassment and Self-Disclosure". Qualitative Sociology. 3 (3): 223–241. doi:10.1007/BF00987137. ISSN 1573-7837. S2CID 143646233.
- Smith, Glenn; King, Michael (June 2009). "Naturism and sexuality: Broadening our approach to sexual wellbeing". Health & Place. 15 (2): 439–446. doi:10.1016/j.healthplace.2008.08.002. PMID 18926761.
- Uebel, Michael (2019). "Dirty Rotten Shame? The Value and Ethical Functions of Shame". Journal of Humanistic Psychology. 59 (2): 232–51. doi:10.1177/0022167816631398. S2CID 147719917.
- Vance, Melissa R. (2005). "Breastfeeding Legislation in the United States: A General Overview and Implications for Helping Mothers". LEAVEN. 41 (3): 51–54. Archived from the original on 31 March 2007.
- Weinberg, Martin S; Williams, Colin J. (2010). "Bare Bodies: Nudity, Gender, and the Looking Glass Body". Sociological Forum. 25 (1): 47–67. doi:10.1111/j.1573-7861.2009.01156.x.
- West, Keon (2018-03-01). "Naked and Unashamed: Investigations and Applications of the Effects of Naturist Activities on Body Image, Self-Esteem, and Life Satisfaction". Journal of Happiness Studies. 19 (3): 677–697. doi:10.1007/s10902-017-9846-1. ISSN 1573-7780.
- Wolf, JH (2008). "Got milk? Not in public!". International Breastfeeding Journal. 3 (1): 11. doi:10.1186/1746-4358-3-11. PMC 2518137. PMID 18680578.

=== News ===
- Grulovic, Tiyana (2014). "Simply the Breast". Flare Toronto. Vol. 36, no. 10 (Oct 2014). pp. 70–71.
- Andreatta, David (September 22, 2017). "When boys swam nude in gym class". Democrat and Chronicle.
- Lis, Lea (May 5, 2019). "Eight Things to Know About Nudity and Your Family". Psychology Today.
- Barber, Nigel (May 7, 2013). "Sexual Wiring of Women's Breasts". Psychology Today.
- Senelick, Richard (3 February 2014). "Men, Manliness, and Being Naked Around Other Men". The Atlantic.
- Sicha, Choire (December 3, 2015). "Men's Locker Room Designers Take Pity on Naked Millennials". The New York Times.
- Smithers, Rebecca (21 December 1999). "Curtains for schools' communal showers". The Guardian.
- Taylor, Zanthe (February 28, 2012). "The (Un-Erotic) Glories of Nudity". Psychology Today.
- Zadrozny, Brandy (May 14, 2015). "Are These the World's Most Graphic Sex-Ed Videos?". The Daily Beast.

=== Websites ===
- Eng, Monica (September 10, 2017). "Baring It All: Why Boys Swam Naked In Chicago Schools". WBEZ.
- Hadfield, James (December 10, 2016). "Last splash: Immodest Japanese tradition of mixed bathing may be on the verge of extinction". Japan Times.
- Kincaid, James R. (31 January 2000). "Is this child pornography?". Salon. Archived from the original on 30 April 2007.
- Markowitz, Eric (April 29, 2014). "Until Fairly Recently, The YMCA Actually Required Swimmers To Be Nude". Vocativ.
- Steinbach, Paul (2017). "Designing Public Locker Rooms with an Eye on Privacy". Athletic Business.
- Williams, Pete (August 19, 2019). "Women ask Supreme Court to toss topless ban: Why are rules different for men?". NBC News.
