= SHC =

SHC may refer to:

== Science ==
- Src homology 2 domain-containing, in structural biology, a structural domain in signal transduction proteins
- SHC1, a human gene
- Sirohydrochlorin, a chemical precursor to various enzymes.
- Specific heat capacity, in physics, a substance's heat capacity per unit mass, usually denoted by the symbol c or s
- Spontaneous human combustion, a theory that, under certain conditions, a human being may burn without any apparent external source of ignition

== Schools ==
- Spring Hill College, a predominantly undergraduate Jesuit university in Mobile, Alabama
- Schreyer Honors College, an honors program at the Pennsylvania State University
- Stanford Humanities Center, a humanities organization located at Stanford University
- Sacred Heart Cathedral Preparatory, a co-ed Catholic school in San Francisco, California, United States
- Sacred Heart College, Auckland, a Catholic, Marist secondary school in Auckland, New Zealand

== Religion ==
- Sacred Heart Cathedral (disambiguation), a name for multiple Catholic cathedrals
- Society of the Holy Cross (Korea), an order of nuns in the Anglican Church of Korea

== Other uses ==
- All-Ireland Senior Hurling Championship, in the sport of hurling
- Canadian Historical Association (Société historique du Canada)
- Serving His Children, a Christian nonprofit organization based in Uganda
- Shc (shell script compiler) for Unix-like operating systems
- South Health Campus, in Calgary, Alberta, Canada
- A song on the Sacred Hearts Club album by Foster the People
- Saharsa Junction railway station (station code: SHC), Bihar, India
