= Social impact of thong underwear =

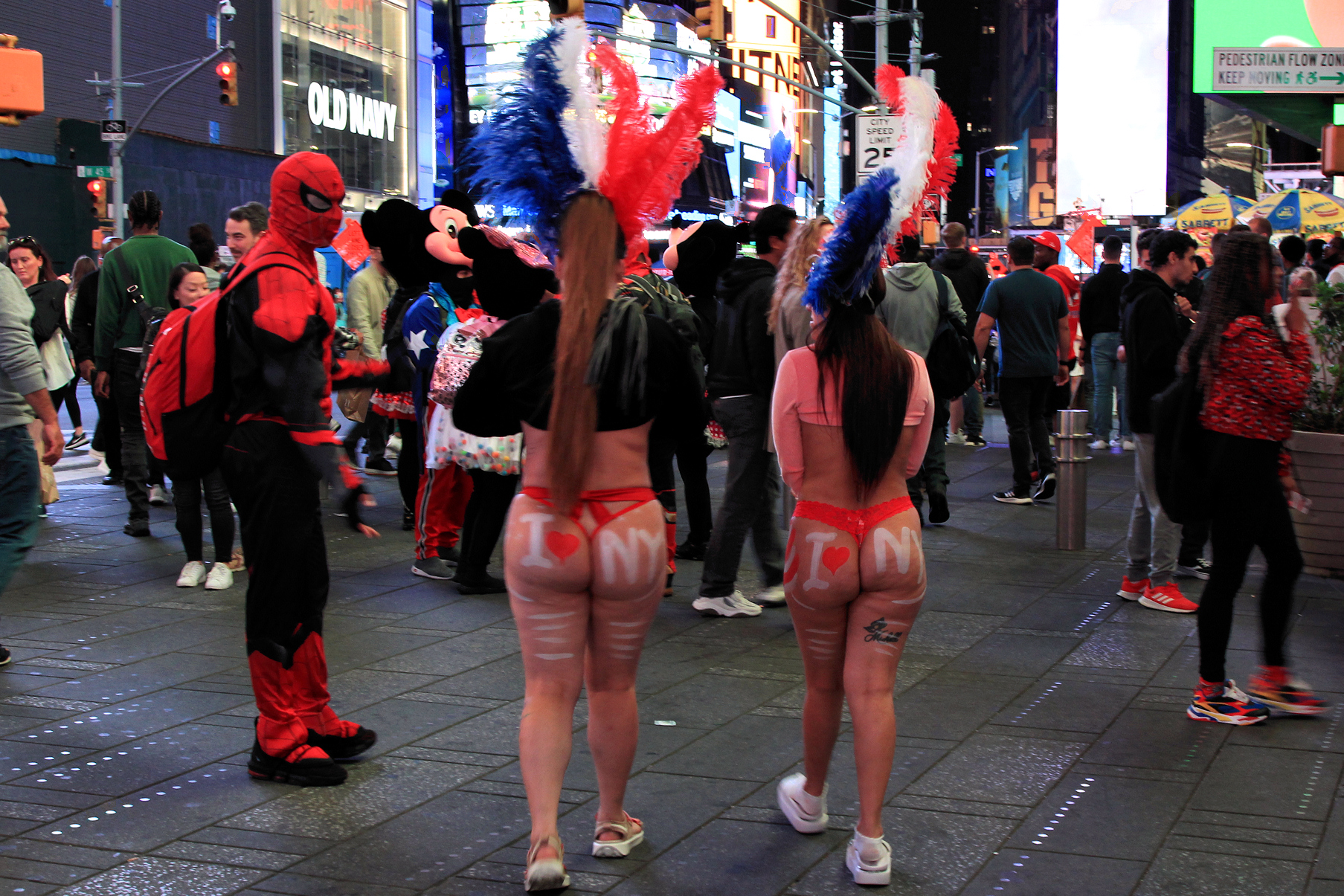
Two women with body paint on their buttocks wearing thongs at an event in Times Square, New York City

The social impact of thong underwear has been covered extensively in the media, ranging from bans on wearing thongs to thongs for children.

== Overview ==
Monica Lewinsky gave evidence during the Lewinsky scandal that she was flirting with Bill Clinton in Leon Panetta's office, and that she lifted her jacket to show him the straps of her thong underwear above her pants. Some of the news media in America used thong underwear as a metonym for smut in the Starr Report. According to feminist commentator Carrie Lukas, Lewinsky "with her thong-snapping seduction, forever changed the image of the D.C. junior staffer from aspiring policy wonk to sexual temptress."

Marketing analysts Marian L. Salzman, Ira Matathia and Ann O'Reilly observed in the book Buzz: Harness the Power of Influence and Create Demand that thong brands are riding on the wide media coverage of thongs to create buzz. Photographer Lauren Greenfield wrote in her book Girl Culture, "Understanding the dialectic between the extreme and the mainstream – the anorexic and the dieter, the stripper and the teenager who bares her midriff or wears a thong – is essential to understanding contemporary feminine identity."

In 2004, political commentator Cedric Muhammad wrote in essay The Thong versus the Veil, "We wondered at the end of the day, of the two groups of women most prominently featured on American TV these days, who gains more respect for their intellect and spirit – the Afghan woman who is so totally veiled that you can't even see her eyes or the Black woman in the R&B and Hip-Hop video who dances while wearing a bikini and thong?"

== Christian commentary ==
The rise of thong usage has been asserted by Christian minister Oneil McQuick to be linked to a rise of sexualization in society, and by Christian writer Philo Thelos to be linked to a rise in the desire to go unclothed.

When discussing the trend of wearing thongs, Christian writer Sharon Daugherty commented in her book What Guys See That Girls Don't: Or Do They? that the fashion industry "may have changed the mindset of our society". This was followed by her observation that "the whole idea of wearing so that no panty line or bumps can show isn't substantiated" and that "the thong was created by fashion designers to arouse sexual thoughts".

== School restrictions ==
In 1999 a Miami University male professor was banned from using the school's recreation center because he refused to stop wearing thong swimwear. The professor challenged the school in court. In 2000 a high school principal in Salinas, California was in the center of a variety of controversies including bans on certain types of clothing to the extent that "thong panties were unofficially banned." One student alleged that she was given a dress-code violation note for wearing a thong. This story made national headlines in the United States.

In 2002, a female high school vice principal in San Diego physically checked up to 100 female students' underwear as they entered the school for a dance, with or without student permission, causing an uproar among students and some parents and eliciting an investigation by the school into the vice principal's conduct. In her defense, the vice principal said the checks were for student safety and not specifically because of the wearing of thongs. In 2003, the head teacher of a British primary school voiced her concern after learning that female students as young as 10 were wearing thong underwear to school. This incident led to a media debate about the appropriateness of thong underwear marketed to young girls.

In 2003 the University of Victoria Law School in Canada briefly put the school logo on thongs, but quickly pulled them from sale after controversy sprang up. In the mid-2000s the dress code for St. Ambrose Academy, a Roman Catholic middle school and high school in Madison, Wisconsin, specifically described swimsuits with "thong-cut legs" as inappropriate. In the same decade Dixon High School in Dixon, California had a dress code which specified that all undergarments – specifically listing thongs, along with bras and briefs – must be covered.

== Sports ==
In 2012 the 4-H program at the University of California specifically forbade "string, thong or crochet" swimsuits for women. For men, the dress code specified "swim trunks only (no shorts, cut-off pants, or Speedos)." A similar policy by Virginia FCCLA bans "skimpy bikini or thong type suits" for women and specifies "swim trunks" for men ("no speedos").

In 2001, Vicky Botwright, then 16th seeded in women's squash circuit and dubbed the "Lancashire Hot Bot", was prohibited by the Women's International Squash Players Association (WISPA) from wearing a thong and a sports bra in the British Open Championships. Initially, WISPA was "suggesting a thong was inappropriate", but in the end decided no formal ruling was needed against thongs. Botwright stated that "we should be able to wear skimpy clothing if we want to, as some of the more conventional outfits we wear can be quite restrictive..."

In 2004, Alexander Putnam competed in the London Marathon in a green thong and painted as a tropical tree to protest against logging in Congo.

Female bodybuilders in America are prohibited from wearing thong or T-back swimsuits if contests are being filmed for television, otherwise they are allowed to do so.

== For younger girls ==
It is difficult to point out exactly when younger girls, or those under eighteen years old, started to wear thongs. However, in 1997, an owner of a Fort Worth, Texas boutique noted that many high school girls wore thongs under their dresses when attending prom. By 1999, there is at least one documented case of middle-school aged girls wearing them. The popularity of thongs among young girls was to an extent that thong sales for tweens, or those between 7 and 12 years old, totaled about $400,000 in 2000 but increased to about $1.6 million for 2003.

The 2000s saw a rise in the popularity of thongs among younger girls, who have been dubbed "thong feminists" by comedian Janeane Garofalo. According to child therapist Ron Taffel, when 12-year-old girls wear a thong, "it's not about rebellion against adults"; rather, he says that the thong is a "statement to other kids that they are part of this very, very intense, powerful second family of peer group and pop culture that is shaping kids' wants, needs and feelings." Developmental psychologist Deborah Tolman does not agree that all young girl thong-wearing is sexualized; she states that "[k]ids are engaged with their sexuality at younger ages, but they're not necessarily sexually active", and she says tween thong wearers may be facing "...social pressure to look sexy – without crossing over the murky line into seeming slutty".

Understanding the risqué nature of the underwear, in order to buy thongs, girls adopted a number of strategies. At times, after a bit of prodding, some would receive permission from their parents to buy and wear them. While others did not receive parental permission to purchase thong underwear, they would do so anyway by using their allowance. Knowing that some parents who discovered that their daughters bought thongs without permission would throw the underwear in the garbage, many girls would try their best to hide the underwear during laundry days.

The growing popularity of thongs among young girls strongly affected the environment of many middle and high schools across the Western world. By 2004, in at least one American high school, thong exposure was common enough that one student stated that it happened "all the time. Several times a day." Whether revealed accidentally or purposefully, the underwear became a ubiquitous part of many middle and high schools with girls exposing their thongs walking to school, sitting down in class or in the cafeteria, bending over at a locker, and even while participating at school-sanctioned functions such as dances. The look became so ubiquitous that when describing teenage actress Keira Knightley, who was described as wearing "baggy trousers hanging off her hips to expose a flash of pink thong," the Evening Standard stated that Knightley "look[ed] like any teenager."

With thongs entrenched as a must-have item by the mid-2000s, some girls experienced strong pressure to wear them. In 2005, at one American high school, a high school first-year student, who did not like thongs, noted that she might have been the only student in her physical education class who was not wearing them. As one of the few who did not, while changing in the locker, another student teased her and called her "Granny" due to her decision not to wear thongs. A thirteen-year-old living in Canada, writing in 2006, expressed similar frustrations; some of her peers made fun of her because she did not wear thongs. Adding insult to injury, she noted that her friends could wear thongs but she could not.

While sometimes the pressures to wear thongs were explicit, at other times they may have been purely in one's head. A high school first-year student living in the United States, writing in 2006, noted the mental difficulties of changing in a locker room where most of the girls wore thongs. While this particular student did not note being explicitly teased by her peers, she imagined that other girls were doing so behind her back. This feeling played a role in her desire to ask her mother for thongs.

Actress Evan Rachel Wood (left), portraying the character Tracy, and actress Nikki Reed (right), portraying the character Evie, revealing thongs while filming Thirteen. The film presented the exposed thong trend as a trait seen in troubled teens.

Entertainment media would pick up on the trend. In one particularly infamous episode from the show Degrassi: Next Generation, the teenaged character Manny Santos dropped her innocent look by adopting a more risqué fashion sense that showcased an exposed rhinestone-studded blue thong over low-rise jeans. The episode may have been inspired by a real-life decision made by her real-life actress Cassie Steele. In an effort "to be taken seriously and be mature and more sexy", the then-teenager purposefully revealed a whale tail during rehearsal. Afterwards, the aforementioned episode would be written and produced.

Degrassi was not the only form of media to showcase the trend. Kaley Cuoco, portraying 17-year-old high school student Bridget, would reveal her thong in multiple scenes for the premiere episode of the 2002 show 8 Simple Rules. When teased, Bridget, perhaps echoing the sentiments of many girls her age, defiantly noted that she is part of the "thong generation." In the 2003 film Thirteen, Evie Zamora, played by actress Nikki Reed, is portrayed as a free-spirited but troubled middle school student. One key aspect of Evie's behavior is her tendency to expose her thong underwear. Evan Rachel Wood, who portrayed fellow middle school student Tracy Freeland, befriended Evie and quickly adopted her exposed thong habit. Tracy's appropriation of this behavior is an important part of her character's transformation from being a mild-mannered honor student to a troubled teenager who steals and does drugs.

The trend has been attributed to pop idols like Britney Spears and Jennifer Lopez. In 2002 Abercrombie & Fitch released a line of thong underwear targeted for girls ages 10–16, though critics pointed out that children as young as seven could fit one of the thongs. A spokesman for A&F, Hampton Carney, stated that he could list "at least 100 reasons why a young girl would want thong underwear." This controversy spawned a great deal of free publicity for Abercrombie, including a chain letter that received wide circulation. In 2007 British retailer Argos removed from sale its G-string panties and padded bras for nine-year-old girls, following negative response from the public. In Japan, photobooks and DVDs of underaged girls in T-back thongs have become popular as "T-back Junior Idols", a phenomenon which has been criticised as a disguised form of child pornography.

== Other incidents ==
- In October 2002, Florida officials banned thongs from Daytona Beach.
- In 2007 the Tennessee Department of Correction banned prison visitors from wearing thong or g-string underwear. In the words of Correction Commissioner George Little, prisoners "don't need any help getting turned on."
- In 2019, an online retailer's high-cut 'front thong' bodysuit garnered a negative response from women, who felt the garment was too revealing and that it could cause discomfort to the genital area.

== Popular culture ==
- In 1999, R&B singer Sisqó recorded the "Thong Song" on his Unleash the Dragon album.
- Writer-director Glen Weiss made three movies titled the Thong Girl, based on the comic book of the same name. The story of the films revolved around the Thong Girl, an independent superhero. Parts of the film were shot in Nashville's mayor's office in 2007.
- In 2007, Beermaker Rolling Rock aired a commercial poking fun of male thong wearers during Super Bowl XLI.
- In 2002, Shefali Zariwala, a model in India, became known as the "thong girl" for her performance in which her thong is visible, in the music video of Kaanta Laga. The album sold two million copies and the music video became an overnight success in India.
- In 2008, a diamond studded thong worth US$122,000 was featured in a Singapore lingerie fashion show. It had 518 brilliant-cut diamonds, totaling 30 carats (6.0 g), studded into the front of a black lace thong in a floral pattern, as well as 27 white gold tassels hanging off it.
- Actor Tom Holland revealed his experience wearing a thong for his role as Spider-Man in 2021, citing the garment's unique role in his costume design. This garnered widespread media coverage and sparked discussions about the practicality and impact of thong underwear in modern fashion and film.

== See also ==
- Sexual objectification
- Sexual revolution
- Underwear as outerwear
- Whale tail
