= Bimbo (disambiguation) =

In English, Bimbo is slang referring to an attractive but unintelligent woman.

In German, Bimbo is an ethnic slur used against people of African descent and other people with very dark skin.

Bimbo may also refer to:

== People ==
- Bimbo Ademoye (born 1991), Nigerian actress
- Bimbo Danao, stage name of Filipino actor Rodrigo Custodio Danao (1915–1967)
- Katalin Bimbó (born 1963), Canadian philosopher

=== Nickname ===
- Franz Binder (1911–1989), Austrian soccer player
- Alejandro Carmona (born 1983), Puerto Rican basketball player
- Bimbo Coles (born 1968), American basketball player
- Bimbo Odukoya (1960–2005), Nigerian pastor and televangelist

== Business ==
- Grupo Bimbo, a Mexican-based baking conglomerate
  - Bimbo Bakeries USA, the largest bakery company in the United States
- Bimbo, a soft drink sold in Peru, now a subsidiary of Coca-Cola
- Management buy-in § Buy-in management buyout (BIMBO), a form of acquisition of a company

== Arts and entertainment ==
- Bimbo, play by Keith Waterhouse
- Bimbo the Birthday Clown, a cardboard cut-out on The Uncle Bobby Show, a Canadian children's program that ran from 1964 to 1979
- Bimbo, a Siamese cat character in books for children by Enid Blyton
- Miss Bimbo, a British online fashion game
- Bimbo the Great, Joseph E. Levine's title for the US release of Rivalen der Manege

=== Animation and comics ===
- Bimbo (Fleischer Studios), a 1930s Fleischer Studios cartoon dog character, boyfriend of Betty Boop
- Bimbo (comics), a British children's comic that ran from 1961 until 1972
- The Circus of P.T. Bimbo, a 1970s comic strip by Howie Schneider

=== Music ===
- Bimbo (musical group), an Indonesian religious vocal group
- Bimbo Jet, a French Euro disco group, known for their hit "El Bimbo"
- Bimbo (Virgin album), 2004
- Bimbo (Jim Reeves album), 1957
- "Bimbo" (song), a 1954 song by Jim Reeves, covered by Gene Autry
- "Bimbo", a 2001 single by Lambretta
- "Bimbo", a song by Yello, from the album Solid Pleasure

== Places ==
- Bimbo, Central African Republic, second-largest city of the Central African Republic
