= Female Chauvinist Pigs =

Book by Ariel Levy

Female Chauvinist Pigs: Women and the Rise of Raunch Culture
- Author: Ariel Levy
- Language: English
- Genre: Feminism, pop culture
- Publisher: Free Press
- Publication date: August 2005
- Publication place: United States
- Media type: Print (hardback & paperback)
- Pages: 240
- ISBN: 0-7432-4989-5

Female Chauvinist Pigs: Women and the Rise of Raunch Culture is a 2005 book by Ariel Levy that critiques the highly sexualized American culture in which women are objectified, objectify one another, and are encouraged to objectify themselves. Levy refers to this as "raunch culture."

== Background ==
According to Levy, raunch culture is a product of the unresolved feminist sex wars – the conflict between the women's movement and the sexual revolution. Another source places the beginnings of raunch culture in the permissive society of the 1960s, which in postfeminist perspective was less about female sexual liberation than fulfilling the male fantasy of unlimited female availability. Levy also characterizes raunch culture as a backlash against the stereotypes of "prude" and "uptight" (women) applied to many second-wave feminists (e.g., anti-pornography feminists). Herbert Marcuse's intuition of the increased role of sexuality in advanced industrialism was increasingly confirmed by a pragmatic alliance between neo-liberalism and the commodification of sexuality.

The 1990s saw the ever-growing sexualization of the media, with raunchiness emerging in the overlapping interfaces of music, TV, video, and advertising. By the close of the century, figures like Germaine Greer were talking critically of sex-positive feminism, whereby acknowledging one's inner "slut" (in a commodified context) was seen as an ultimate goal.

Levy claims that the enjoyment of raunch, or "kitschy, slutty stereotypes of female sexuality," has existed through the ages, but it was once a phenomenon that existed primarily in the male sphere and has since become mainstream and highly visible. Raunch culture has penetrated "political life, the music industry, art, fashion, and taste."

== Levy's critique of raunch culture ==
Citing examples ranging from Playboy Bunny merchandise for women to the moral panic of rainbow parties, Levy argues that American mass culture has framed the game so perversely that young women now strive to be the "hottest" and "sexiest" girl they know rather than the most accomplished. Although raunch culture is focused on the sex appeal of women, it is solely image-based: "It's about inauthenticity and the idea that women should be constantly exploding in little bursts of exhibitionism. It's an idea that female sexuality should be about performance and not about pleasure." Levy argues that in a raunch culture, many women engage in performances of sexuality that are not actual expressions of their sexuality but are designed for the pleasure of the male observer(s) – or appear as though they are trying to be pleasurable sex objects. Levy describes "hotness" as the degree to which someone is trying to be sexually attractive, regardless of how conventionally attractive they are.

Further, Levy theorizes that many women internalize the objectifying male gaze that permeates a raunch culture, leading them to participate in self-objectification quite willingly, falsely believing that it is a form of female empowerment and sexual liberation. According to Levy, there is nothing to support the "conception of raunch culture as a path to liberation rather than oppression." Others, such as Susan Brownmiller, a well-known American feminist, journalist, author, and activist, share this opinion.

Although raunch originated in the male domain, Levy claims that it "no longer makes sense to blame men." Central to Levy's analysis of raunch culture is the concept of "Female Chauvinist Pigs": women who sexually objectify other women and themselves. According to Levy, there are two strategies a Female Chauvinist Pig (FCP) employs to "deal with her femaleness." In the first strategy, an FCP distinguishes herself from women whom she deems excessively feminine ("girly-girls"), while simultaneously objectifying such women (e.g., going to strip clubs, reading Playboy, and talking about porn stars). Women may employ this strategy as an attempt to attain the elevated status of the dominant group and overcome their oppression by acting like male chauvinists. In the second strategy, an FCP objectifies herself through her choice of apparel and expression of stereotypes of female sexuality. This strategy may also be employed as an attempt to gain status, through embodying what society portrays as the ideal object of male desire.

Levy criticizes what she refers to as "lipstick feminists" and "loophole women." According to Levy, lipstick feminists believe, for example, that stripping is empowering for women and that putting on a show to attract men, for instance through makeup, clothing, or girl-on-girl physical contact, is not contrary to the goals and ideals of feminism. Levy disagrees with this view, criticizing such lipstick feminists as those involved in the CAKE organization, which provides sexually oriented entertainment for women. Levy quotes from the CAKE website: "The new sexual revolution is where sexual equality and feminism finally meet."

On the other end of the spectrum, Levy takes issue with women who make their way in a man's world by playing by men's rules. Sometimes, she argues, these women even make their fame and fortune by objectifying other women; for example, Levy finds it interesting that the Playboy organization was run by a woman, Christie Hefner, Hugh Hefner's daughter. Levy addresses women who succeed in male-dominated fields on their merit, but shy away from feminism, saying: "But if you are the exception that proves the rule, and the rule is that women are inferior, you haven't made any progress."

Levy proposes the following as a solution: "Ending raunch culture will require citizens to scrutinise the way they regard gender. Objectification is rooted in disrespect, condescending views of the opposite gender, and power struggles. When men realise that they have the capability to fundamentally respect women, and women realise that they have the power to present themselves as empowered, fully capable people, raunch culture may moan its last and final faked orgasm."

== Examples of raunch culture ==
=== Playboy ===
Playboy, an American magazine company that features photographs of nude women, was founded by Hugh Hefner but is primarily run by women. Among these women is Hefner's daughter, Christie Hefner, the chairman and CEO of Playboy Enterprises. Brief biographies of the models sometimes accompany the images displayed in Playboy; however, the focus is on the models' sexualized bodies. Not all of the women who have appeared in the magazine have careers in modeling; many are celebrities (such as singers and actresses) or athletes, for example. Female Olympic athletes, before the summer 2004 games in Athens, interrupted their busy training schedules to pose nude in Playboy, or nearly nude in FHM (For Him Magazine).

=== The Man Show ===
The Man Show, a variety program on Comedy Central, was initially hosted by well-known comedians and television hosts Jimmy Kimmel and Adam Carolla and was one of the top shows on cable in 2000. In the same year, thirty-eight percent of the viewers were female, and it was executive co-produced by two women. The show presents women as sexual objects, is self-described as "chauvinistic fun," and concludes each episode with a scene of women bouncing on trampolines. Levy reports that although women involved with The Man Show are sexualized because of their gender, they are also told that they have temporary "honorary man" status. According to executive co-producer Jennifer Heftler, this status as "one of the guys" is an advantage of her job, in that it meant that she would no longer have to prove herself as a woman who is not excessively feminine or easily offended, and is thus relatable to men. Heftler posits that this advantage is also the female viewers' incentive for watching The Man Show.

=== Girls Gone Wild ===
The Girls Gone Wild (GGW) team tours locations where numerous young people are likely to be drinking large quantities of alcohol – spring break destinations, sports bars, Mardi Gras, and "hard-partying colleges" – filming young women who are willing to expose their bodies on camera. Levy found that many women who appeared on GGW were eager to display their bodies for a GGW hat or T-shirt, while others did not immediately comply with the cajoling of peers or the crew, but eventually relented.

=== Stripping ===
Levy, along with many feminists, perceives stripping as a perpetuation of the objectification of women, valuable only for its potential to serve as necessary income. The author discusses the contrasting view, prevalent in raunch culture, in which stripping is idealized and conceptualized as liberating and empowering by numerous women, including feminists. As examples of this, Levy mentions "Cardio Striptease" classes (workouts in lingerie), as well as G-String Divas, a television show about strippers which was executive produced by Sheila Nevins, feminist and well-known veteran of HBO.

=== CAKE ===
CAKE is a feminist group concerned with women's sexuality in terms of liberation and self-expression. While the organization encourages women to explore their sexuality, the parties themselves have the appearance of an average strip club. According to Levy, pornography and objectification of women are prevalent at CAKE parties and events.

== See also ==
- Feminist sex wars
- Gender studies
- Ladette
- Libertine
- Pornified
- Pornographication
- Pornotopia
- Sexual objectification
- Social impact of thong underwear
- Women's pornography
