= Ariel Levy (writer) =

American writer (born 1974)

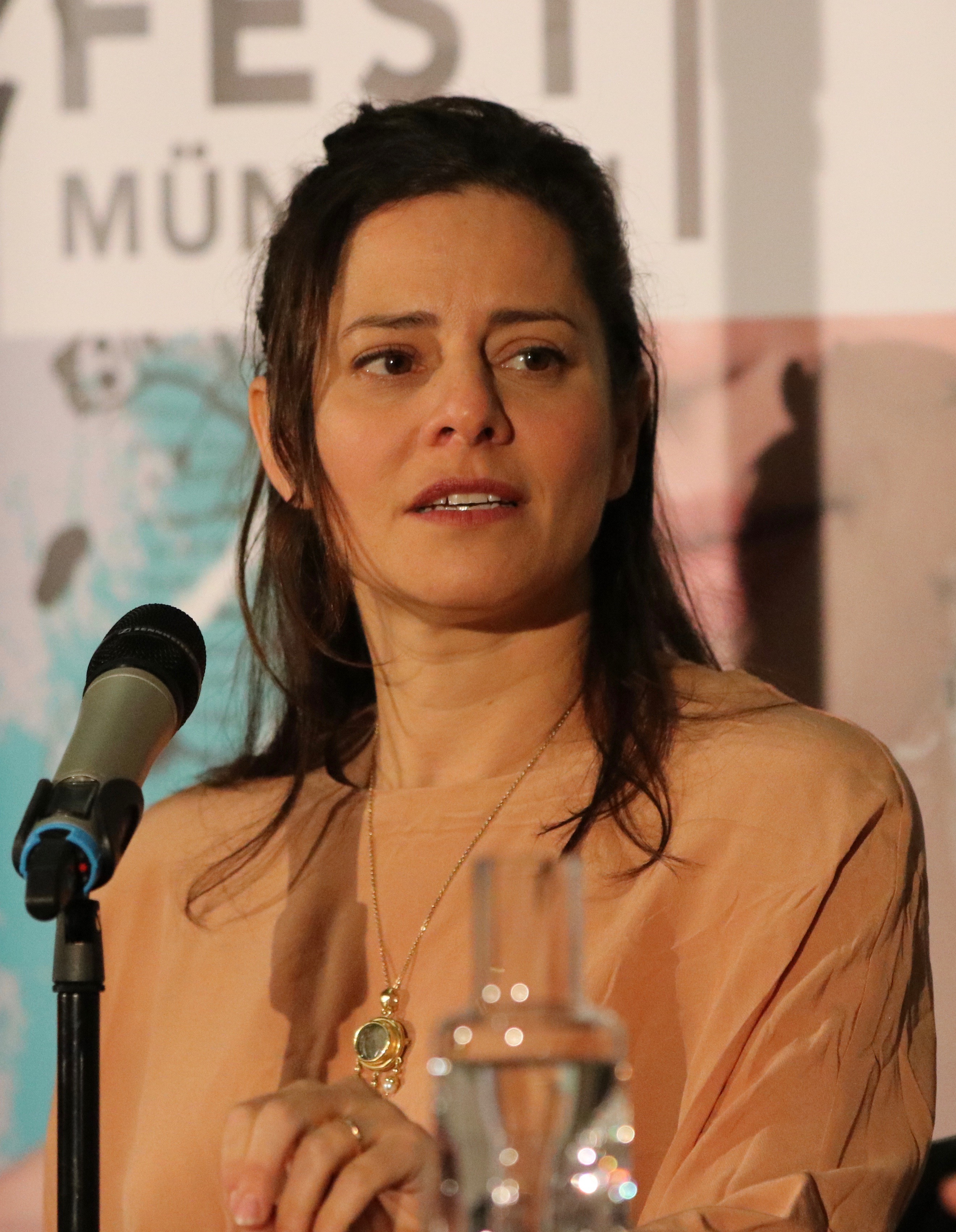
- Levy in 2017
- Born: 1974 (age 51–52)
- Education: Wesleyan University
- Occupation: Writer
- Spouses: Amy Norquist (m. 2007; div. 2012); John Gasson (m. 2017)
- Writing career
- Notable work: Female Chauvinist Pigs (2005)
- Website: ariellevy.net

Ariel Levy (born 1974) is an American journalist and staff writer at The New Yorker magazine. She's the author of the books The Rules Do Not Apply and Female Chauvinist Pigs: Women and the Rise of Raunch Culture. Her work has appeared in The Washington Post, The New Yorker, Vogue, Slate, and The New York Times. Levy was named one of the "Forty Under 40" most influential out individuals in the June/July 2009 issue of The Advocate.

== Early life and education ==
Levy was raised in a Jewish family in Larchmont, New York, and attended Wesleyan University in the 1990s, graduating in 1996. She says that her experiences at Wesleyan, which had "coed showers, on principle," strongly influenced her views regarding modern sexuality. After graduating from Wesleyan, she was briefly employed by Planned Parenthood but claims that she was fired because she is "an extremely poor typist." She was hired by New York magazine shortly thereafter.

== Writings ==
At The New Yorker magazine, where Levy has been a staff writer since 2008, she has written profiles of Cindy McCain, Silvio Berlusconi, Edith Windsor, Caster Semenya, Lamar Van Dyke, Mike Huckabee, Callista Gingrich and Ottessa Moshfegh. At New York magazine, where Levy was a contributing editor for 12 years, she wrote about John Waters, Stanley Bosworth, Donatella Versace, the writer George W. S. Trow, the feminist Andrea Dworkin, and the artists Ryan McGinley and Dash Snow. Levy has explored issues regarding American drug use, gender roles, lesbian history and culture, and the popularity of US pop culture staples such as Sex and the City. Some of these articles allude to Levy's personal thoughts on the status of modern feminism.

Levy criticized the pornographic video series Girls Gone Wild after she followed its camera crew for three days, interviewed both the makers of the series and the women who appeared on the videos, and commented on the series' concept and the debauchery she was witnessing. Many of the young women Levy spoke with believed that bawdy and liberated were synonymous.

Levy's experiences amid Girls Gone Wild appear again in Female Chauvinist Pigs, in which she attempts to explain "why young women today are embracing raunchy aspects of our culture that would likely have caused their feminist foremothers to vomit." In today's culture, Levy writes, the idea of a woman participating in a wet T-shirt contest or being comfortable watching explicit pornography has become a symbol of strength; she says that she was surprised at how many people, both men and women, working for programs such as Girls Gone Wild told her that this new "raunch" culture marked not the downfall of feminism but its triumph, but Levy was unconvinced.

Levy's work is anthologized in The Best American Essays of 2008, New York Stories, and 30 Ways of Looking at Hillary.

In 2013 The New Yorker published her essay, "Thanksgiving in Mongolia" about the loss of her newly-born son at 19 weeks while traveling alone in Mongolia. In March 2017, Random House published Levy's book, The Rules Do Not Apply: A Memoir, about her miscarriage, an affair, her spouse's alcoholism, and their eventual divorce.

Levy was the co-writer for Demi Moore's 2019 autobiography, Inside Out.

In April 2020, Levy wrote a controversial article for The New Yorker about Renee Bach, a white American missionary accused of pretending to be a medical professional and performing procedures on Ugandan children. Levy took a sympathetic view towards Bach. The group No White Saviors, whose co-founder, Kelsey Nielsen, was interviewed for the article, demanded a full retraction and apology, claiming Nielsen was misquoted and discredited, and that Levy "underrepresented and manipulated" the experiences of alleged victims and purposely left out evidence against Bach in the article.

Levy, along with actor John Turturro, adapted Philip Roth's novel Sabbath's Theater for the stage. In 2023, the Signature Theatre Company produced it at the Romulus Linney Courtyard Theatre of the Pershing Square Signature Center, an off-Broadway theater, with Turturro starring as Mickey Sabbath.

== Personal life ==
Levy is openly bisexual. She married Amy Norquist in 2007. They divorced in 2012. Levy chronicled the divorce in her memoir. In 2017, she married John Gasson, a doctor from South Africa who tended to her during her miscarriage in Mongolia.

== Bibliography ==
=== Books ===
- Levy, Ariel (2005). Female chauvinist pigs : women and the rise of raunch culture. New York: Free Press.
- —, ed. (2015). The best American essays 2015. Mariner Books.
- — (2017). The rules do not apply. New York: Random House.

=== Essays, reporting and other contributions ===
- Levy, Ariel (April 21, 2008). "Goodbye again". Gender Dept. The New Yorker.
- — (March 2, 2009). "Lesbian nation : when gay women took to the road". American Chronicles. The New Yorker.
- — (2011). "Female chauvinist pigs". In Rosenblum, Karen E. & Toni-Michelle C. Travis (eds.). The meaning of difference : American constructions of race, sex and gender, social class, sexual orientation, and disability : a text/reader (6th ed.). Dubuque, Iowa: McGraw-Hill.
- — (January 2, 2012). "Drug test". Letter from Bangalore. The New Yorker. 87 (42): 30–36. (Note: Kiran Mazumdar-Shaw.)
- — (March 4, 2013). "Gaonnuri". Goings on About Town. Tables for Two. The New Yorker. 89 (3): 10.
- — (March 18, 2013). "Bagman". The Talk of the Town. Dept. of Coveting. The New Yorker. 89 (5): 25.
- — (May 6, 2013). "Living-room leopards : a new group of breeders want to undomesticate the cat". Department of Husbandry. The New Yorker. 89 (12): 28–32.
- — (May 13, 2013). "Pearl & Ash". Goings on About Town. Tables for Two. The New Yorker. 89 (13): 17.
- — (August 5, 2013). "Trial by Twitter : after high-school football stars were accused of rape, online vigilantes demanded that justice be served. Was it?". A Reporter at Large. The New Yorker. 89 (23): 38–49.
- — (September 30, 2013). "The perfect wife : how Edith Windsor fell in love, got married, and won a landmark case for gay marriage". Profiles. The New Yorker. 89 (30): 54–63.
- — (February 10, 2014). "Breaking the waves : in her sixties, a swimmer revives an old dream". Profiles. The New Yorker. 89 (48): 26–32. (Note: Online version is titled "Diana Nyad breaks the waves".)
- — (April 14, 2014). "Willow Road". Goings on About Town. Tables for Two. The New Yorker. 90 (8): 19.
- — (April 13, 2015). "The price of a life : what's the right way to compensate someone for decades of lost freedom?". Annals of Justice. The New Yorker. 91 (8): 54–63.
- — (March 13, 2017). "Secret selves : Catherine Opie's photographs expose hidden truths about people and places". Profiles. The New Yorker. 93 (4): 58–67. (Note: Online version is titled "Catherine Opie, all-American subversive".)
- — (May 1, 2017). "A long homecoming : the novelist Elizabeth Strout left Maine, but it didn't leave her". Life and Letters. The New Yorker. 93 (11): 22–26. (Note: Online version is titled "Elizabeth Strout's long homecoming".)
- — (January 13, 2020). "World without pain : does hurting make us human?". Dept. of Science. The New Yorker. 95 (44): 18–24.
- — (June 1, 2020). "Looking for trouble : contrarianism has made Lionel Shriver famous, but fiction is what she believes changes minds". The New Yorker. 96 (15): 40–47. (Note: Online version is titled "Lionel Shriver is looking for trouble".)
- — (February 15–22, 2021). "The believer : Glennon Doyle's best-selling gospel of honesty". Profiles. The New Yorker. 97 (1): 30–35. (Note: Online version is titled "Glennon Doyle's honesty gospel".)
- — (September 5, 2022). "Mom com : Amy Schumer's second act". Onward and Upward with the Arts. The New Yorker. 98 (27): 16–20. (Note: Online version is titled "Amy Schumer’s mom com".)

== See also ==
- Feminist sex wars
- Third-wave feminism
- Pornographication
