= Katie Davis (missionary) =

American missionary and author

Katie Davis Majors
- Citizenship: United States
- Occupations: missionary, writer
- Spouse: Benji Majors (m. 2015)
- Children: 15 (as of February 2020)
- Writing career
- Years active: 2007-present
- Genre: Gen Y/Millennial Memoir
- Subjects: Christian missions, child-/family-centric
- Notable works: Founding of AMI (2008), and Amazima Primary School (2020); authorship of Kisses from Katie: A Story of Relentless Love and Redemption (2011) and Daring to Hope: Finding God's Goodness in the Broken and the Beautiful (2017)
- Website: amazima.org

Katie Davis Majors is an American missionary and author who established a mission in Jinja, Uganda in 2007. Her work led to the founding of a school and provision of other services in Jinja, which now operate under the auspices of the Tennessee-based not-for-profit, Amazima Ministries International (AMI).

== Early life ==
Davis was born in 1989. Her mother, Mary Pat Davis, and her father, Scott Davis, raised her in Nashville. She is the family's oldest child, and has a younger brother named Bradley. In Brentwood, Tennessee, Davis was a homecoming queen of her high school, as well as class president. Her intention after high school was to study nursing in college.

== Missionary work ==
Eighteen-year-old Davis went to Uganda for a year-long mission trip; during her senior year of high school. While there, she did mission work in the city of Jinja on the shores of Lake Victoria, which had a population of approximately 85,000 at the time. Jinja is 50 miles from Kampala, the capital of Uganda, which had a population of more than 2 million people at the time. Davis wrote that she fell in love with the Ugandan people and their culture, and decided to go back to Uganda in the summer of 2007 (after graduating from high school).

Davis, at 19, was helping kindergarten children in Canaan Children's Home, an orphanage in Jinja. As described by Bob Smietana for USA Today,

"Davis... noticed many of her students were dropping out because either their parents had died or they could no longer afford school fees. Some parents were dropping off their children at orphanages because they could not provide basics like food and shelter. So Davis persuaded her parents and other friends to donate money for school, meals and medical care for the children."

Eventually, this led to the creation of a sponsorship program that paired children with American and other donors who would donate the $300 needed annually to cover the child's school, medical, and food costs. Davis, her family and supporters founded Amazima Ministries Internation (AMI) in 2008 - a 501(c)(3) not-for-profit organization based in Franklin, Tennessee. The name "Amazima", means "Truth" in the native Lugandan language of Uganda. In the fall of 2008, Davis fulfilled a promise to her parents and returned to the U.S. to enrol in nursing college. Her return was short lived; stating that "she quickly realized she missed the [children] too much." She left college and returned to Uganda. During 2009–2010, Davis and Amazima initiated the Masese Feeding Program serving 1200, as well as the Masese Beading Circle, for the Jinja District community in a fishing region on Lake Victoria. The Masese area in eastern Ugandan is a "small community of displaced people on the outskirts of Jinja", to its east on the Lake. It is known for its high incidence of child abductions (and even the giving over of children, driven by poverty), including where unregistered healers ("witch doctors") and sacrifice are involved. As of July 2011, Amazima was described as drawing on donors from the United States to feed more than a thousand children each weekday, while providing programs aimed at community health, and helping 400 to attend school. As of October 2011, Amazima was being described as

"an organization based in Jinja that sponsors Ugandan school children, provides vocational opportunities for poor Ugandans, and distributes food and health care services to the families of more than 1,600 children in Masese, a nearby slum."

As of October 2012, Amazima was staffed by a dozen Ugandans and operating on a $700,000 annual budget, providing daily meals to about 2,000 children and managing the sponsorship of about 500 students. As of 2016, the organization was managing the sponsorships of 600 through its Scholarship Program, and was providing medical care to more than 4300. In addition to managing sponsorships and vocational opportunities, and distributing food and health care, Amazima established a farming outreach program, and a specific program to sell the paper and glass bead jewelry manufactured by Ugandans in its Masese Beading Circle to customers in the United States and elsewhere. By March 2018, its program to provide meals was still serving 1200 individuals daily, and the student sponsorships had grown to include around 800 children.

As of July 2011, Davis was employed as the director of Amazima, employment that she uses to support herself and those in her care.

=== Personal care for orphans ===
Within six years of returning to Uganda, Davis had taken 13 Ugandan orphans into her care, The journey began in January 2008, as Davis described it to NPR, following the rainstorm collapse of a mud hut that housed three orphans. The collapse, near where she was working in Jinja, led Davis to seek out relatives of the girls to take them in, and failing that, to have them live with her (rather than being consigned to the already overcrowded orphanage). Within two years, a further ten girls who had lost parents to AIDS or had been abused or abandoned joined. Davis described her quandary, thus:

"My first instinct [was] not, 'Oh, a baby - let me adopt it!' Because I think, best-case scenario, they're raised in Uganda by Ugandans... But knowing there [was] nowhere else for them to go, I [didn't] find myself capable of sending them away."

In the period that followed, Davis was named the court-appointed caregiver for the girls, and by October 2011, age 22-years-old, she began a process that would allow her to adopt them at age 25 (the minimum age required by Ugandan law). As of October 2017, she describes in an interview as having "lost a child to an unfair system", and in care of fourteen children. By 2022, she had adopted 13 children.

Davis documented her experiences in a decade-long blog that began the year of her arrival (through 2017) - entitled "Kisses from Katie". She also wrote two memoirs that became New York Times bestsellers: Kisses from Katie: A Story of Relentless Love and Redemption (2011), and Daring to Hope: Finding God's Goodness in the Broken and the Beautiful (2017).

=== Local & International disapproval ===
As of July 2011, one local child welfare officer, Caroline Bankusha, had publicly expressed concern over the planned adoption, stating, "Unless the children are placed under a children's ministry or children's home, which she [could] start... it is really bad for someone to have more than five children". Bankusha, while noting the legislated 25-year-old minimum parental age, and the stipulation that parents be "at least 21 years older than the child being adopted", acknowledged that it was within the purview of the deciding judge to allow adoption exceptions were they to deem it as being in the children's best interests.

It has also been suggested that she adopted children with parents and was unwittingly manipulated by Ugandans. The organization No White Saviors has seen Davis's work as an example of double standards in the treatment of local NGOs and white foreigners, comparable with Renee Bach.

== Published works ==
- Davis, Katie (with Beth Clark) (2011). Kisses from Katie: A Story of Relentless Love and Redemption. New York, NY: Simon and Schuster. ISBN 9781451612103. Appeared and spent at least 14 weeks as a paperback New York Times bestseller, through December 2012.
- Majors, Katie Davis (2017). Daring to Hope: Finding God's Goodness in the Broken and the Beautiful. New York, NY: Penguin Random House (Crown-Multnomah). ISBN 9780735290518. Appeared as a hardback New York Times bestseller in October 2017.
- Majors, Katie Davis (2023). Safe All Along: Trading Our Fears and Anxieties for God's Unshakable Peace. New York, NY: Penguin Random House (Crown-Multnomah). ISBN 0593445112.
- Majors, Katie Davis (2023). Our Faithful God Devotional. New York, NY: Penguin Random House (Crown-Multnomah). ISBN 9780593445174.

== Personal life ==
Davis was described by Bonnie Allen of NPR as "a devout Christian who idolizes Mother Teresa."

Davis married Benji Majors in 2015, and took his last name. The Majors gave birth to a first son, Noah, in 2016, a second son Levi in 2018, and were still living in Jinja as of 2022.

== See also ==
Renee Bach

== Further reading and viewing ==
- PRH Staff & Majors, Katie Davis (October 2, 2017). "How Katie Davis Majors Held On to Hope and Wrote Her Book" (promotional description, interview). PenguinRandomHouse.com.
- Gifford, Kathie Lee & Kotb, Hoda (interviewers) and Majors, Katie Davis (interviewee) (October 3, 2017). Giving: Meet the Inspiring Young Woman Who Adopted 13 Girls in Uganda (streaming video). New York, NY: TODAY.com. Event occurs at 00:23, 00:39.
- Lee, Skyler (December 1, 2018). "Katie Davis Majors Became An Adoptive Mother To 13 Daughters At 23". HumanDefense.com. St. Augustine, FL: Human Defense Initiative.
- Parrish, Kate (December 1, 2017). "Nashville Moment: Katie Davis Majors". Nashville Lifestyles. Nashville, TN.
- Shellnutt, Kate (August 7, 2014). "33 Under 33, Continued: Your Recommendations for Christian Millennials to Watch". ChristianityToday.com. Carol Stream, IL: Christianity Today International.
- Vu, Michelle (November 8, 2017). "Katie Davis Majors, Young Adoptive Mother of 13 Ugandans: Where Is God in Suffering?" (interview). ChristianWeek.org – via ChristianPost.com.
- Tobi (April 18, 2011). "Missionary Monday—Katie Davis: Uganda". SimplyJesusMinistries.com. Archived from the original (blog) on January 25, 2016.
