= Sexualization of women athletes in sports broadcasting =

Sexualization of women athletes in sports broadcasting refers to the presentation of women athletes in ways that focus on their physical appearance or sexual attractiveness rather than on their athletic performance. This topic has been studied extensively in sport media research and has been the subject of debate among athletes, broadcasters, journalists, and scholars. Research has examined how camera framing, editing, commentary, promotional material and broadcast production might contribute to gender portrayals of athletes.

== Background ==
The representation of women in sports media has been the subject of scholarly research since the 1980s. Studies have consistently found that women receive less sports media coverage than men and that the coverage they do receive is most likely to emphasize appearance, femininity, or personal life. Scholars have argued that such portrayals may reinforce gender stereotypes by presenting women as object of visual attention rather than competitors. Although coverage of women's sport has increased substantially since the 1990s, researchers have continued to examine whether differences remain in the visual and verbal presentation of male and female athletes.

== Camera framing ==
One area of research concerns broadcast camera work. Scholars have analyzed the frequency of close ups shots, low angle views, slow motion replays and prolonged focus on athlete's bodies during television broadcast. Critics argue that these production choices can draw attention to athlete's physical appearance instead of their performance. The issue has received particular attention during major international competitions, including the Olympic Games, where individuals broadcast clips have periodically generated public criticism. Social media has increased scrutiny by allowing isolated camera shots to be widely circulated outside their original broadcast context.

Some studies have found evidence of gender difference in visual framing, while others have reported that contemporary Olympic broadcast employ relatively similar production techniques for male and female competitors. Researchers have therefore have described the issue as evolving rather than uniform across sports and broadcasters.

== Commentary and presentation ==
Research has also examined differences in broadcast commentary. Studies have found that commentators have been more likely to discuss female athlete's appearance, clothing, age, family relationships, or emotions than those of men. By contrast, commentary of male athletes has historically focused more heavily on athletic ability, tactics and competition. Subsequent research has suggested that these differences have diminished in some sports and broadcast organizations although disparities continue to be reported in others.

== Sport specific debates ==
The issue has been discussed across numerous sports, including athletics, beach volleyball, gymnastics, tennis, figure skating and swimming. Debate often centers on whether certain camera angle or production techniques are necessary to show the action effectively or instead place unnecessary emphasis on athlete's bodies. Some athletes have criticized certain broadcasts images or replay sections, arguing that they distract from sporting achievements. Others have stated that standard cameras positions are an inherit part of sport broadcasting and should not automatically be interpreted as sexualizing.

== Broadcaster responses ==
Broadcast organizations generally maintain that camera placement is determined primarily by the technical requirements of each sport, including the need to follow play capture finishes or illustrate athletic technique. Broadcasters have also stated that production standards are intended to be applied consistently across men's and women's sport.

In response to criticism, some broadcasters and sport organizations have reviewed production practices and issued guidance encouraging camera operators and directors to avoid unnecessary body focused shots or editorial choices that could reinforce gender stereotypes.

== Academic perspectives ==
Media scholars have approached the subject through theories including objectification theory, gender representation and the "male gaze". Research has examined how visual framing may influence audience perceptions of athletic competence, credibility and professionalism. At the same time, scholars have cautioned against assuming that all close ups or low angel shots are inherently sexualizing, noting that many serve legitimate sporting or technical purposes. Recent research has emphasized that the importance of considering the context, duration and editorial intent of camera framing rather than evaluating individual images or isolation.

== See also ==
- Women's sports
- Sports journalism
- Sexual objectification
- Male gaze
