= Sexualization =

To make something sexual in character

Sexualization (sexualisation in Commonwealth English) is the emphasis of the sexual nature of a behavior or person. Sexualization is linked to sexual objectification, treating a person solely as an object of sexual desire. According to the American Psychological Association, sexualization occurs when "individuals are regarded as sex objects and evaluated in terms of their physical characteristics and sexiness." "In study after study, findings have indicated that women more often than men are portrayed in a sexual manner (e.g., dressed in revealing clothing, with bodily postures or facial expressions that imply sexual readiness) and are objectified (e.g., used as a decorative object, or as body parts rather than a whole person). In addition, a narrow (and unrealistic) standard of physical beauty is heavily emphasized. These are the models of femininity presented for young girls to study and emulate."

== Culture and media ==
Sexualization has been a subject of debate for academics who work in media and cultural studies. Frederick Attenborough states the term has not been used simply to label what is seen as a social problem, but to indicate the much broader and varied set of ways in which sex has become more visible in media and culture. These include: the widespread discussion of sexual values, practices and identities in the media; the growth of sexual media of all kinds; for example, erotica, slash fiction, sexual self-help books and the many genres of pornography; the emergence of new forms of sexual experience, for example instant message or avatar sex made possible by developments in technology; a public concern with the breakdown of consensus about regulations for defining and dealing with obscenity; the prevalence of scandals, controversies and panics around sex in the media.

According to the Media Education Foundation's documentary Killing Us Softly 4: Advertising's Image of Women, the sexualization of girls in media and the ways women are portrayed in the dominant culture are detrimental to the development of young girls as they are developing their identities and understanding themselves as sexual beings.

The terms "pornification" and "pornographication" have also been used to describe the way that aesthetics that were previously associated with pornography have become part of popular culture, and that mainstream media texts and other cultural practices "citing pornographic styles, gestures and aesthetics" have become more prominent. This process, which Brian McNair has described as a "pornographication of the mainstream". has developed alongside an expansion of the cultural realm of pornography or "pornosphere" which itself has become more accessible to a much wider variety of audiences. According to McNair, both developments can be set in the context of a wider shift towards a "striptease culture" which has disrupted the boundaries between public and private discourse in late modern Western culture, and which is evident more generally in cultural trends which privilege lifestyle, reality, interactivity, self-revelation and public intimacy.

=== Criticism ===
The Australian writers, Catharine Lumby and Kath Albury (2010) have suggested that sexualization is "a debate that has been simmering for almost a decade" and concerns about sex and the media are far from new. Much of the recent writing on sexualization has been the subject of criticism that because of the way that it draws on "one-sided, selective, overly simplifying, generalizing, and negatively toned" evidence and is "saturated in the languages of concern and regulation". In these writings and the widespread press coverage that they have attracted, critics state that the term is often used as "a non-sequitur causing everything from girls flirting with older men to child sex trafficking" They believe that the arguments often ignore feminist work on media, gender and the body and present a very conservative and negative view of sex in which only monogamous heterosexual sexuality is regarded as normal. They say that the arguments tend to neglect any historical understanding of the way sex has been represented and regulated, and they often ignore both theoretical and empirical work on the relationship between sex and media, culture and technology.

The way society shapes ones personal interest is presented in a book review of Girls Gone Skank by Patrice Oppliger, Amanda Mills states that "consequently, girls are socialized to participate in their own abuse by becoming avid consumers of and altering their behavior to reflect sexually exploitative images and goods." The belief that women are powerful and fully capable as men is stated in the text "Uses of the Erotic: The Erotic As Power" by Audre Lorde stating that the suppression of the erotic of women has led them feeling superior to men "the superficially, erotic had been encouraged as a sign of female inferiority on the other hand women have been made to suffer and to feel opposed contemptible and suspect by virtue of its existence".

== Effects on children ==
Children and adolescents spend more time engaging with media than any other age group. Often in these media, children are exposed to sexualisation, and knowledge of sexual behaviour.

Sexualization of young girls in the media and infantilization of women creates an environment where it becomes more acceptable to view children as "seductive and sexy". It makes having healthy sexual relationships more difficult for people and creates sexist attitudes.

Some cultural critics have postulated that over recent decades children have evidenced a level of sexual knowledge or sexual behaviour inappropriate for their age group.

=== Australia ===
In 2006, an Australian report called Corporate paedophilia: sexualisation of children in Australia was published.

=== European Union ===
In 2012, a draft report a European Parliament resolution gave the following definition of sexualization:

[S]exualisation consists of an instrumental approach to a person by perceiving that person as an object for sexual use disregarding the person's dignity and personality traits, with the person's worth being measured in terms of the level of sexual attractiveness; sexualisation also involves the imposition of the sexuality of adult persons on girls, who are emotionally, psychologically and physically unprepared for this at their particular stage of development; sexualisation not being the normal, healthy, biological development of the sexuality of a person, conditioned by the individual process of development and taking place at the appropriate time for each particular individual

=== Scotland ===
In 2010, the Scottish Executive released a report titled External research on sexualised goods aimed at children. The report considers the drawbacks of the United States and Australian reviews, concluding:

[T]here is no indication [in the APA report] that the media might contain any positive images about human relationships, or that children might critically evaluate what they see.

The Scottish review notes:

Such accounts often present the sexualisation of children as a relatively recent development, but it is by no means a new issue … While the public visibility of the issue, and the terms in which it is defined, may have changed, sexualised representations of children cannot be seen merely as a consequence of contemporary consumerism.

It also notes that previous coverage "rests on moral assumptions … that are not adequately explained or justified."

=== United Kingdom ===
The report 'Letting Children Be Children', also known as the Bailey Review, is a report commissioned by the UK government on the subject of the commercialisation and sexualisation of childhood.

=== United States ===
As early as 1997, reports found that sexualization of younger children is becoming more common in advertisements.

The causes of this premature sexualization include portrayals in the media of sex and related issues, especially in media aimed at children; the lack of parental oversight and discipline; access to adult culture via the internet; and the lack of comprehensive school sex education programs.

In 2007, the American Psychological Association (APA) first published Report of the APA Task Force on the Sexualization of Girls, which has had periodic updates. The report looked at the cognitive and emotional consequences of sexualization and the consequences for mental and physical health, and impact on development of a healthy sexual self-image. The report considers that a person is sexualized in the following situations:

- A person's value comes only from his or her sexual appeal or sexual behavior, to the exclusion of other characteristics;
- A person is held to a standard that equates physical attractiveness (narrowly defined) with being sexy;
- A person is sexually objectified—that is, made into a thing for others' sexual use, rather than seen as a person with the capacity for independent action and decision making; and/or
- Sexuality is inappropriately imposed upon a person.

Research has linked the sexualization of young girls to negative consequences for girls and society as a whole, finding that the viewing of sexually objectifying material can contribute to body dissatisfaction, eating disorders, low self-esteem, depression, and depressive affect. Medical and social science researchers generally deployed "sexualization" to refer to a liminal zone between sexual abuse and normal family life, in which the child's relationship with their parents was characterized by an "excessive", improper sexuality, even though no recognizable forms of abuse had occurred. The American Psychological Association also argues that the sexualization of young girls contributes to sexist attitudes within society and a societal tolerance of sexual violence as well as that consumerism and globalization have led to the sexualization of girls occurring across all advanced economies, in media and advertisements, to clothing and toys marketed for young girls.

The APA cites the following as advertising techniques that contribute to the sexualization of girls:

- Including girls in ads with sexualized women wearing matching clothing or posed seductively.
- Dressing girls up to look like adult women.
- Dressing women down to look like young girls.
- The employment of youthful celebrity adolescents in highly sexual ways to promote or endorse products.

The APA additionally further references the teen magazine market by citing a study by Roberts et al that found that "47% of 8- to 18-year-old [girls] reported having read at least 5 minutes of a magazine the previous day."

A majority of these magazines focused on a theme of presenting oneself as sexually desirable to men, a practice which is called "costuming for seduction" in a study by Duffy and Gotcher.

Studies have found that thinking about the body and comparing it to sexualized cultural ideals may disrupt a girl's mental concentration, and a girl's sexualization or objectification may undermine her confidence in and comfort with her own body, leading to emotional and self-image problems, such as shame and anxiety.

Research has linked sexualization with three of the most common mental health problems diagnosed in girls and women: eating disorders, low self-esteem, and depression or depressed mood.

Research suggests that the sexualization of girls has negative consequences on girls' ability to develop a healthy sexual self-image.

In 2012, an American study found that self-sexualization was common among 6–9-year-old girls. Girls overwhelmingly chose the sexualized doll over the non-sexualized doll for their ideal self and as popular. However other factors, such as how often mothers talked to their children about what is going on in television shows and maternal religiosity, reduced those odds. Surprisingly, the mere quantity of girls' media consumption (television and movies) was unrelated to their self-sexualization for the most part; rather, maternal self-objectification and maternal religiosity moderated its effects.

A result of the sexualization of girls in the media is that young girls are "learning how to view themselves as sex objects". When girls fail to meet the thin ideal and dominant culture's standard of beauty they can develop anxieties. Sexualization is problematic for young children who are developing their sexual identity as they may think that turning themselves into sex objects is empowering and related to having sexual agency.

==== Products for children ====
Some commercial products seen as promoting the sexualization of children have drawn considerable media attention:

- A number of doll lines have drawn controversy. The original Bratz Dolls, marketed to children as old as 12, were considered by at least one preteen to be "sexy" and were noted for their more mature styles such as shrunken sweaters, shredded jeans, and other suggestive clothing. They were noted in a New York Times article to "look as though they might be at home on any street corner where prostitutes ply their trade." Bratz Baby Dolls marketed at 6-year-old girls that feature sexualized clothing, like fishnet stockings, feather boas, and miniskirts also advertised fashion similar to that of the mainline "Bratz" line. The My Scene Barbie line, aiming for children in the 8-12 age demographic as the answer to the Bratz line, also drew criticism as the dolls wore low-rise pants, revealed the navel, and wore lots of makeup.
- Highly sexualized and gendered Halloween costumes marketed at young girls, such as the "sexy firefighter", a costume that consists of a tight fitted mini dress and high heeled boots. A girl's version of a police officer costume also designed similarly. Costumes made for somewhat older girls, such as those around ten-years-old, may be much shorter in length. Comparing and contrasting similar costumes designed by pre-tweens and tweens, the differences in costumes for the somewhat older girls was so dramatic that one observer noted that "According to the costume manufacturers of America, once a girl child reaches double digits, it is officially time for the Halloween hoochification process to begin."
- Thong underwear designed by Abercrombie & Fitch made specifically for ten-year-olds. Released in 2002, the thongs were "adorned with the images of cherries and candy hearts and also include the words "'kiss me'" and "'wink, wink.'" While a company spokesman specifically stated that the thongs are not appropriate for children younger than ten, the thongs may have been small enough for girls as young as seven-years old to wear. Despite the controversy, at least some of the thongs were sold; one Abercrombie clerk stated at a mother bought thongs for both of her daughters, who looked to be ten or younger, because all the others girls in their class had at least one. While the Abercrombie & Fitch thongs were eventually pulled, girls aged 10 and 11 wearing thongs in primary school became a regular enough occurrence in at least one English school that the headmaster sent a letter asking parents to not allow their daughters to wear them. In France, also in 2003, girls, some of them ten-years old, revealed whale tails on their way to school by exposing their thong underwear above their pants.
- Clothing such as T-shirts being marketed for young children in preschool and elementary school with printed slogans like "So Many Boys So Little Time." Other examples include the retailer Big W selling T-shirts for young girls with the slogan "nice baubles" in 2014 and the UK-based company Twisted Tee selling t-shirts that had nipple pasties. Some onesies also drew controversy. A Target onesie made for baby girls with the phrase "I only date heroes" and a TinyHaute Couture creating a cotton onesie for babies that had designs of a lace corset on it.
- Clothing originally aimed at young adult women marketed to tweens. Advertised to tween girls since at least the year 2000, low-rise jeans, tight-fitting miniskirts, and shirts that expose the midriff, once worn predominately by young adult women, became core fashion staples for many American tweens in the 8-12 age range in the 2000s. These styles, sold across the country, were so popular at one point that finding other styles for preteen girls became a difficult task for parents.
- Padded bras on bikinis aimed at seven-year-old girls. The bikinis were pulled after complaints in 2010. While made for girls slightly older, previously, in 2006, an Australian Target began selling a lightly padded Target brand bra designed for girls as young as eight-years-old. However, there is also evidence that with the mean age of puberty declining in Western cultures, a higher percentage of preteen girls will have enough breast development to justify wearing a functional brassier than ever before.

The Scottish Executive report surveyed 32 High street UK retailers and found that many of the larger chains, including Tesco, Debenhams, JJ Sports, and Marks & Spencer did not offer sexualized goods aimed at children. The report noted that overall prevalence was limited but this was based on a very narrow research brief. Whilst this shows that not all High street retailers were aiming products deemed sexualized by the researchers, the research cannot be taken out of context and used to say that there is not an issue of sexualization.

== Effects on non-European women ==
The media plays a significant role in the sexualization of women. "The media are likely to have powerful effects if the information is presented persistently, consistently, and corroborated among forms. As a media affect, stereotypes rely on the repetition to perpetuate and sustain them." According to Celine Parrenas Shimizu, "To see race is to see sex, and vice versa."

=== Black women ===
Many scholars trace the sexualization of Black women back to slavery, where certain stereotypes were invented as a way to dehumanize Black women. These stereotypes include the Jezebel, seen as a light skin overly sexual Black woman with no control over her desires; the Mammy, a Black woman who was asexual in nature and whose sole purpose was to cook for a white family; the Sapphire, first shown on the Radio/Television show Amos n' Andy, she was a loud, crude, jealous woman, who took joy in emasculating men. These stereotypes have carried over to the way young Black girls view themselves and how society views them. The Jezebel stereotype, in particular, has reemerged in the form of hip-hop video vixens. These images seen in music videos have two effects: they influence how black women are viewed in society and they also shape how Black women view themselves.

"Representations of Black girlhood in the media and popular culture suggest that Black girls face a different set of rules when it comes to sex, innocence, and blame", the consequences of the sexualization of Black girls can be seen through the 2004 trial of R. Kelly. The immediate response from the public cleared R. Kelly of any wrongdoing while subsequently blaming the young girl for her abuse. One respondent to a Village Voice article claimed that she was not disturbed by the video because in her words, "It wasn't like she was new to the act. [She--the respondent] heard she [the victim] worked it like most of [her] 30 something-year-old friends have yet to learn how to do". This desensitization is directly linked to a music industry—and subsequent fans—who value the artist over their potential victims." Instead of being correctly labeled as victims these women are instead turned into "groupies, hoochies, and chickenheads". One of the jurors on the R. Kelly case noted that he believed the defense because her body "appeared to developed". Sika A. Dagbovie-Mullins acknowledged that "this harmful and skewed reasoning reflects a national troubling tendency to view black adolescent females as sexually savvy and therefore responsible themselves for the sexualization and exploitation of their bodies".

Dagbovie-Mullins introduced new problems in regards to the sexualization of Black girls, completely dichotomous to the sexualization of Black girls is the infantilization of Black women. Both of these problems are caused by denying the agency of Black women. Both the infantilization of Black women and the sexualization of young girls are about looking at Black women purely through the lens of their sexuality, without regard to their agency. There is a link between the images of a submissive woman being portrayed by a girl and a willingness for people to believe that young Black girls can give consent. This is a narrative that is supported by the sexy school girl image portrayed in media. The image girls off the illusion of being unavailable—both from a moral and legal standpoint—while at the same time being available. "Music, music videos, and images play a pivotal role in the messages individuals hear and see. These messages can be positive or negative, and they can influence how consumers and producers respond to and interrogate them critically, socially, physically, and emotionally".

The images portrayed "in both African American and mainstream American culture reinforce the lenses through which the everyday experiences and ideal for adolescent Black women are viewed". Shows like the Flavor of Love which rely on the stereotype of the Black pimp and the submissive women, where Flavor Flav strip women of their real name and gives them nicknames such as "Thing 1" and "Thing 2" showcase the denial of the agency of Black women. This denial of agency makes it easier for people to see them as little more than sex symbols. Infantilizing them and stripping them of all things that make them individuals creates a culture in which Black women are no longer seen as people, but objects used for individual male pleasure. Making it easier to side with men when Black women accuse them of assault because Black women cannot be assaulted when all they want is sex.

Along with a deflated sense of self-worth, these stereotypes can also influence Black girls—notably poor ones—that their sense of worth and an escape from poverty can be found through their sexualization. The more modern version of the Jezebel—a black woman who is highly sexual and materialistic—may also have the most importance to inner-city Black girls, "The sexual links to poverty and its relevance to survival are clear. Their lives have been called 'ghetto fabulous', where they are socially embedded in a culture of poverty, yet have the economic means to procure middle-class goods".

Even women are guilty of the sexualization, Nicki Minaj who made the phrase "Barbie Bitch" popular and raps about how she only "fuck[s] with ballers" draw on stereotypes such as the gold digger in order to promote her brand. While the "Bad Bitch Barbie" character was developed out of a history of over-sexualizing the bodies of Black women, it has also been used as a way of Black women to reconquer their sexuality. No longer is it men using their bodies for the enjoyment of other men, but it is they themselves who are showcasing their features as a way of uplifting who they are. Hence, duality is created within hip-hop culture the sexualization of Black women is still being seen, but with the emergence of female artists, we also see an emergence of a counter-culture reclaiming the sexuality of Black Women as their own. While are the same time the "Bad Bitch Barbie" still creates unrealistic images for black girls to compare themselves to. By reclaiming the sexuality that was robbed of them by men, they have introduced a new problem of body dimorphism as Black girls face the pressures to recreate themselves in the images being presented.

In an NPR interview with Professor Herbert Samuels at LaGuardia Community College in New York and Professor Mireille Miller-Young at UC Santa Barbara, they talk about sexual stereotypes of black bodies in America and how even in sex work, already a dangerous job, black women are treated much worse than their counterparts due to the effects of their over-sexualization and objectification in society. Black women's bodies are either invisible or hypervisible. In the 1800s, a South African woman named Sarah Baartman was known as "Hottentot Venus" and her body was paraded around in London and Paris where they looked at her exotic features such as large breasts and behind. Her features were deemed lesser and over sexual.

=== Asian women ===
The image of Asian women in Hollywood cinema is directly linked to sexuality as essential to any imagining about the roles they play as well as her actual appearance in popular culture. Asian female fatale's hypersexualized subjection is derived from her sexual behavior that is considered as natural to her particular race and culture. Two types of Asian stereotypes that are commonly found in media are the Lotus Flower and the Dragon Lady. The Lotus Flower archetype is the "self-sacrificing, servile, and suicidal Asian woman." The dragon lady archetype is the opposite of the lotus flower, a "self-abnegating Asian woman…[who] uses her 'Oriental' femininity, associated with seduction and danger to trap white men on behalf of conniving Asian males." According to film-maker and film scholar, Celine Shimizu, "The figure of the Asian American femme fatale signifies a particular deathly seduction. She attracts with her soft, unthreatening, and servile femininity while concealing her hard, dangerous, and domineering nature."

=== Latinas ===
Latina characters that embody the "hot Latina" stereotype in film and television are marked by easily identifiable behavioral characteristics such as "'addictively romantic, sensual, sexual and even exotically dangerous', self-sacrificing, dependent, powerless, sexually naive, childlike, pampered, and irresponsible".

Stereotypical Latina physical characteristics include "red lips, big bottoms, large hips, voluptuous bosoms, and small waists" and "high heels, huge hoop earrings, seductive clothing." Within the "hot Latina" stereotype lies three categories of representation, the Cantina Girl; the faithful, self-sacrificing Señorita; and the Vamp:

- The Cantina Girl markers are "'great sexual allure', teasing, dancing, and 'behaving in an alluring fashion.'"
- The faithful, self-sacrificing Señorita starts out as a good girl and turns bad by the end. The Señorita, in an attempt to save her Anglo love interest, utilizes her body to protect him from violence.
- The Vamp representation "uses her intellectual and devious sexual wiles to get what she wants." The media represents Latinas "as either [a] hot-blooded spitfire" or "[a] dutiful mother".

The sexual implications of the "hot-blooded" Latina has become an overgeneralized representation of Latinos. This has led many to see the Latinos as "what is morally wrong" with the United States. Some believe it to be wrong simply because the interpretation of this culture seems to go against white, Western culture. Culturally, the Latina is expected to dress "as a proper señorita" in order to be respected as a woman which conflicts with the Western ideals that a girl is sexual if she dresses "too 'mature' for [her] age".

Even in the business world this stereotype continues; "tight skirts and jingling bracelets [are misinterpreted] as a come-on". This sexualization can also be linked to certain stereotypical jobs. The image of the Latina often is not in the business world but in the domestic. The sexualization of Latinas sexualizes the positions that they are expected to occupy. Domestic servants, maids, and waitresses are the typical "media-engendered" roles that make it difficult for Latinas to gain "upward mobility" despite the fact that many hold PhDs.

==== Dominican women ====
In the Dominican Republic, women are frequently stereotyped as sultry and sexual as the reputation of Dominican sex workers grows. Many poor women have resorted to sex work because the demand is high and the hours and pay are often dictated by the workers themselves. White European and American men "exoticize dark-skinned 'native' bodies" because "they can buy sex for cut-rate prices". This overgeneralizing of the sexuality of Dominican women can also carry back to the women's homes. Even "women who...worked in Europe have become suspect..." even if they had a legal job. They have become "exports" instead of people because of their sexualization.

=== Native American women ===
Starting from the time of white colonization of Native American land, some Native American women have been referred to as "squaw." "The 'squaw' [stereotype] is the dirty, subservient, and abused tribal female who is also haggard, violent, and eager to torture tribal captives." Another stereotype is the beautiful Indian princess who leaves her tribe and culture behind to marry a white man.

== Effects on transgender women ==
Angolan model and activist Immani Da Silva has also spoken out on how transgender people are hypersexualised by many societies, and links this sexualisation with social disrespect.

== See also ==
- Child sexuality
- Sexualism
- Bratz
- Kogal
- Miss Bimbo
- Rape culture
- Sexual objectification
- Pornographication
- Social impact of thong underwear
- Sexualization in the video games industry
- Pornified
- Female Chauvinist Pigs: Women and the Rise of Raunch Culture
