= Thong Girl =

Franchise by Glen Weiss

Thong Girl is the comic book creation of writer and filmmaker Glen Weiss. Initially an independent comic book, Thong Girl became a franchise that included movies, video games, action figures, posters and T-shirts.

== Description ==
Thong Girl is a crimefighting superhero who fights crime in a thong bikini and patrols the skies of Nashville, Tennessee (TN), also known as Music City, in the United States. By day, Thong Girl is an assistant district attorney named Lana Layonme. One day, while shopping in the French Quarter in New Orleans, Lana discovered a magical thong that gave her the ability to fly and shoot laser beams from her posterior. Armed with these new weapons, Lana assumed the role of the superhero Thong Girl; her mission - to protect Music City and all of the hat-wearing country music stars from harm and hip-hop music.

Along with publishing comic books and selling Thong Girl merchandise, Thong Girl films released the feature film Thong Girl 3: Revenge of the Dark Widow in 2007. For the film's sequel, Thong Girl 4: The Body Electric, actress and cyber-model Alex del Monacco was cast in the lead role of Thong Girl, with the villain Electar played by Will Jones, also known as "Dr. Epiphone", the spokesman for Epiphone brand guitars. There was also a cameo appearance by Troma Films founder Lloyd Kaufman. Production for Thong Girl 4 began in the fall of 2008 and the film was released in 2010.

Thong Girl is the creation of writer/director Glen Weiss. His company Lucky Louie Productions makes short films, music videos and commercials. Thong Girl 4 was their second feature-length film.

== Controversy ==
When Don Wright, the mayor of Gallatin, Tennessee, allowed filming for Thong Girl 3 to take place in his office, there was a local controversy.
