= Shc (shell script compiler) =

Shell script compiler written in C

- Original author: Francisco Javier Rosales García
- Initial release: 20 November 1991; 34 years ago
- Final release: 4.0.3 / 1 July 2019
- Written in: C
- Operating system: Linux
- License: GPL-2.0-only
- Website: neurobin.org/projects/softwares/unix/shc/
- Repository: www.datsi.fi.upm.es/~frosal/sources/

shc is a shell script compiler for Unix-like operating systems written in the C programming language. The Shell Script Compiler (SHC) encodes and encrypts shell scripts into executable binaries. Compiling shell scripts into binaries provides protection against accidental changes and source code modification, and is a way of hiding shell script source code.

== Mechanism ==
shc takes a shell script which is specified on the command line by the -f option and produces a C source code of the script with added encryption. The generated source code is then compiled and linked to produce a binary executable. It is a two step process where, first, it creates a filename.x.c file of the shell script file filename. Then it is compiled with cc -$CFLAGS filename.x.c to create the binary from the C source code with the default C compiler.

The compiled binary will still be dependent on the shell specified in the shebang (eg. #!/bin/sh), thus shc does not create completely independent binaries.

shc itself is not a compiler such as the C compiler, it rather encodes and encrypts a shell script and generates C source code with the added expiration capability. It then uses the system C compiler to compile the source shell script and build a stripped binary which behaves exactly like the original script. Upon execution, the compiled binary will decrypt and execute the code with the shells' -c option.

== Versions ==
Available Versions
Version	Release date	Changes
shc-4.0.3	01-Jul-2019	Enhance -H flag (Hide commands arguments from ps and cmdline); Remove -s flag (experimental feature not working as expected)
shc-4.0.2	01-Jul-2019	Fix typo; Fix NULL-ptr dereference in shll string
shc-4.0.1	20-Nov-2018	Add LDFLAGS environment variable
shc-4.0.0	17-Nov-2018	Add -H option for extra security without root. It protects against dumping, code injection, `cat /proc/pid/cmdline`, ptrace, etc.. (only works with Bourne shell (sh) scripts with no parameter); Add -s option to force single process for hardening features (requires -H). (only works with Bourne shell (sh) scripts with no parameter); dash support
shc-3.9.8	12-Nov-2018	Add setuid option -S
shc-3.9.7	12-Nov-2018	Fix -U option not working on macOS (10.13.6 High Sierra)
shc-3.9.6	05-Jun-2017	Fix shc causes (null) exec output and aborts processing of bash scripts.
shc-3.9.5	31-May-2017	Fix running shc compiled binary in different shell
shc-3.9.4	17-May-2017	Fix executable not working on Debian (debian bug #861180)
shc-3.9.3	31-Jul-2016	zsh support; Fix shc not working with ksh 93u+
shc-3.9.2	25-Aug-2015	Added BusyBox support with patch (-B flag to compile for Busybox).
shc-3.9.1	03-Apr-2015	Renamed option -T to -U and reversed its logic.
shc-3.9.0	02-Apr-2015	Added output file option with [-o filename] and fixed bug on make install (manual install failed)
shc-3.8.9	04-Dec-2013	Fixing a long-standing bug making the source not hidden.
shc-3.8.7	10-Feb-2010	Bug on 64bit systems with expiration dates.
shc-3.8.5	10-Feb-2010	Fixed untraceable() problems on FreeBSD.
shc-3.8.3	10-Jul-2006	Fixed bug: "vfork" fails on multiprocessor systems.
shc-3.8.2	06-Jul-2006	Fixed bug: "rlax" used after encryption.; Read permission of the script.x exposes it to disassembling.; Group and others read permission is now removed by default.
shc-3.7	28-Jun-2005	Removed all strings in the compiled script.; Improved program output and error messages.; The -m option allows to define the *complete* expiration message.; Updated manpage shc.1.; Fix wrong $0 on ksh.
shc-3.6	16-Jun-2005	Two new options: -D switch on Debug exec calls.; -T switch off unTraceable.
shc-3.4	19-Jun-2003	Remove "bad alignment" problem on AIX and other systems. Where exists, use /proc/<pid>/as in untraceable.
shc-3.3	21-Apr-2003	Prevent to ptrace the process.
shc-3.2	05-Aug-2002	Find ancient pclose that must be fclose.
shc-3.1	05-Aug-2002	Fixed a misbehavior on scripts with a in-first-line option equal to "end of options" (i.e. #!/bin/sh -- ) GCC "warning: return type of `main' is not `int'" removed.
shc-2.4	05-Aug-2002	

== Alternatives ==
- shellcrypt
