= Miss Bimbo =

- Developer: Blouzar
- Platform: Web browser
- Genres: Fashion, social networking

MissBimbo.com (now ximbo.land) is an online fashion game and social networking site. Players style their 'Ximbo' character and level her up by accumulating a variety of attribute points. Points can be earned by playing mini games, participating in competitions, spending time at specific city locations, or points can be bought with in-game currency. The website also features a diverse forum and the opportunity for players to design their own clothes to be sold in the digital shop. Many of the gameplay mechanics and names of attribute points changed when Miss Bimbo was controversially relaunched as Bimboland with new politics, later rebranding to Ximboland with the reported reason being that investors did not like the word 'bimbo'.

== History ==
Miss Bimbo started as an English version of a French game called Ma Bimbo. Ma Bimbo was owned and developed by Beemoov and Miss Bimbo was developed by Blouzar Ltd., London.

In 2008, Beemoov and Blouzar split, citing difficulties co-operating. Blouzar retained rights to the Miss Bimbo game and continued to develop the website independently. Miss Bimbo was closed and relaunched 1 March 2015 as The Republic of Bimboland. Beemoov went on to create Like a Fashionista, which is similar to the original Ma Bimbo game. Miss Bimbo/Bimboland trademarks are now registered under BIMBOLAND LTD.

Traffic to MissBimbo.com still redirects to the previous Bimbolands.com URL, instead of the current ximbo.land address.

== Miss Bimbo ==
=== Gameplay ===
Players were responsible for feeding their bimbo, maintaining her mood, keeping her within a certain weight range, and keeping her clean and healthy. They could earn Bimbo Attitude (BA) and IQ points by playing mini-games or spending time at locations in the city. For instance, bimbos could earn IQ by spending an hour in the library or earn BA by paying for plastic surgery at the clinic or changing their style at the salon. Bimbos could also accumulate BA regularly from their boyfriends and homes.

The main source of income was a job, but the more lucrative source was from the boyfriend. These boyfriends/sugar daddies were based on actual celebrities, and had names parodying them. A bimbo's boyfriend regularly gave her money which can be used in various shops.

Pets were available for purchase to help maintain a bimbo's mood, and food was necessary to keep her from getting thin. If a player fed their bimbo too much, she would get fat. If players did not keep their bimbo happy, she would get depressed and need to see a therapist.

This website can be described as identical to the original site, Ma Bimbo, with the only difference being the English translation.

=== Controversy ===
The site attracted media criticism in 2008 for promoting the use of cosmetic surgery and crash dieting, potentially encouraging pre-teen players to pursue an 'ideal' body image through similar measures.

For example, at one point to level up, you had to gain a ton of weight to become a plus size model, and then rapidly lose it. The game also taught that a plate of vegetables was a sustainable meal, and that anything over 60kg was overweight.

The site only had a 13+ limit, and had a web design that was magnetic towards young girls.

Nicholas Jacquart, Developer of Ma Bimbo and Miss Bimbo, defended the game, saying that it was "an ironic game about the reality of the world." While also saying that it was good for kids, because it taught them to take care of their bimbo and feed them healthy food. Other defenders of the game claimed that criticism was unfair and out of proportion. "What parent in his or her right mind would let a 7 or 9-year-old on a site with "bimbo" in the name?" said one player in an interview.

== Ximboland ==
The Republic of Ximboland was launched as a "real time democracy game" that allows players to choose one of six politically distinct states upon signup. The six states are Agnostica, Antitheocra, Atheista, Freethinkerland, Secville, and Reasonopia. Citizens of each state can vote in elections for their state's Minister. The six State Ministers then have the opportunity to run for the position of Prime Bimbo. Terms last four months, State Minister elections are held on the first day of April, August, December, and elections are held on the first day of February, June, and October for the position of Prime Bimbo. At the end of their term, the Prime Bimbo will receive a portion of the site's revenue from that period.

Only Senators (players who pay a monthly subscription fee) can run for office. In-game currency is also available for purchase, in the form of both standard Bimbo Dollars (B$) and premium Diamonds, though players are able to accumulate both forms of currency without paying.

A male 'Himbo' avatar is available in this version of the game. There is no difference between bimbos and himbos other than the appearance of the avatar and the selection of clothes available for purchase in the shop.

=== Gameplay ===
Players work to level up their bimbo or himbo character by earning Sex Appeal (SA) points. SA can be earned from a variety of sources, such as mini-games or competitions, though the primary way players earn SA is by going to work. Better jobs earn more SA and more B$. Players can secure better jobs for their bimbo by accumulating Fitness, Vanity, and Superficiality points, which can be earned by spending time in the city or bought with B$. Most activities require players to leave their bimbo or himbo to complete a task for several hours, earning one attribute point per hour. For instance, three hours at the salon would earn three Vanity points. A player could also choose to purchase a Botox injection for B$1000 to earn three Vanity points in 30 seconds.

Boyfriends, pets, and houses from Miss Bimbo were all removed in Bimboland. There is also no need to keep your bimbo fed or healthy. Instead, gameplay is more focused on dressing up your bimbo or himbo and participating in fashion competitions. The Prime Bimbo's Fashion Contest (PBFC) is held monthly with the theme chosen by the Prime Bimbo. Players have one week to enter the PBFC and one week to vote for the winner; winners of the PBFC receive SA, Diamonds, and a trophy for their profile. Smaller fashion competitions are also often held by the community, and typically offer rewards of Diamonds and B$. Players can also challenge each other to debates on subjects such as religion or sports, or to outfit fights following various themes such as gothic or cosplay. Fights and debates are available publicly for the community to vote on, the winner receives a few SA and B$.

== See also ==
- Sexualization
