= Sexual objectification =

Treating a person primarily as a sexual object

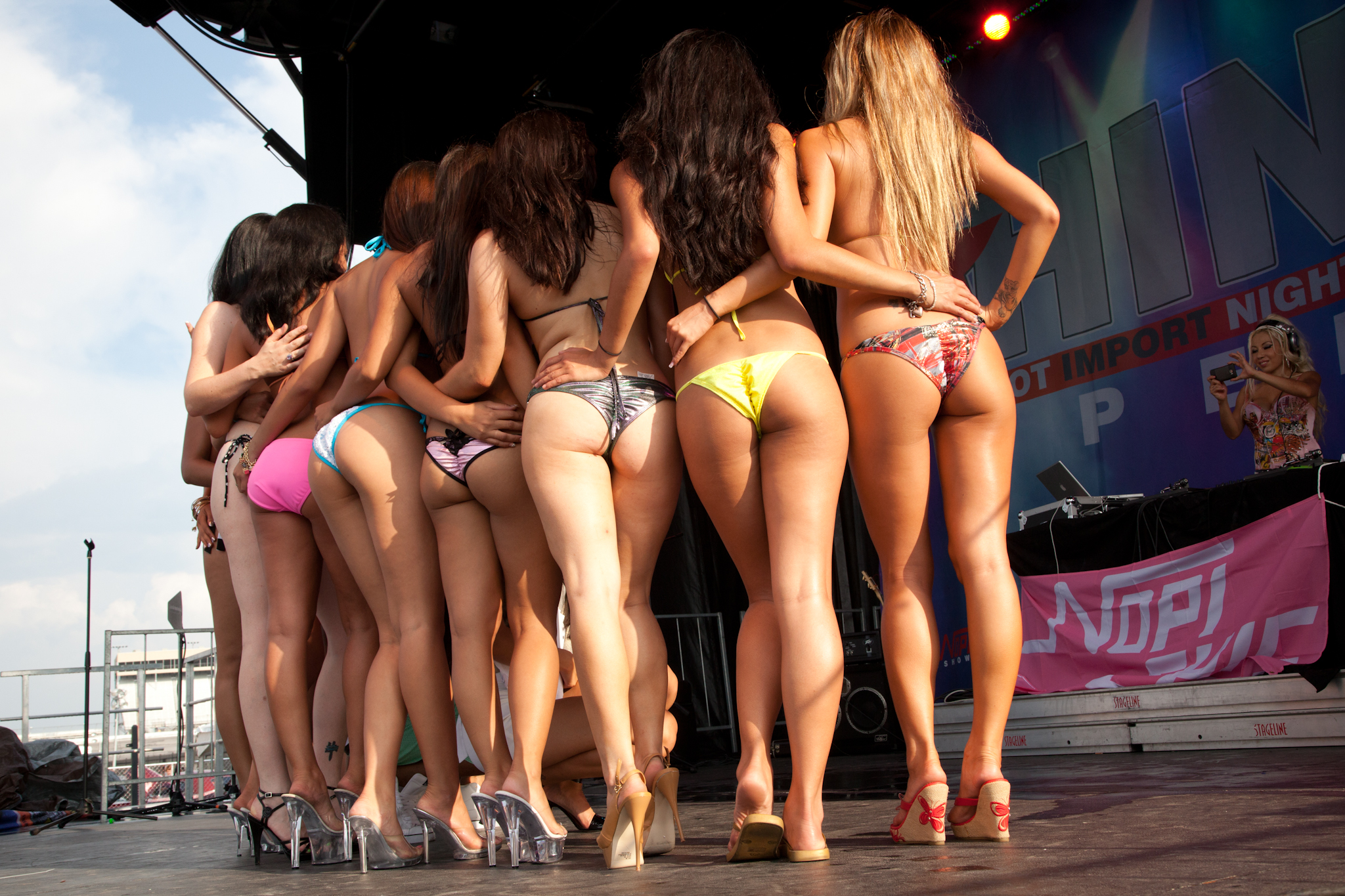
Women in a bikini contest are valued for the sex appeal of their bodies over other attributes.

Sexual objectification is the act of treating a person solely as an object of sexual desire (a sex object). Objectification more broadly means treating a person as a commodity or an object without regard to their personality or dignity. Objectification is most commonly examined at the level of a society (sociology), but can also refer to the behavior of individuals (psychology), and is a type of dehumanization.

Although both men and women can be sexually objectified, the concept is mainly associated with the objectification of women, and is an important idea in many feminist theories, and psychological theories derived from them. Many feminists argue that sexual objectification of girls and women contributes to gender inequality, and many psychologists associate objectification with a range of physical and mental health risks in women. Research suggests that the psychological effects of objectification of men are similar to those of women, leading to negative body image among men. The concept of sexual objectification is controversial, and some feminists and psychologists have argued that at least some degree of objectification is a normal part of human sexuality.

== Objectification theory ==
Objectification theory, which was first put forth by psychologists Barbara Fredrickson and Tomi-Ann Roberts in 1997, offers a socio-psychological framework for analyzing women's lived experiences in societies that sexually commodify the female body. According to the theory, girls and women are socialized to internalize an outsider's perspective as their primary view of their physical selves due to widespread cultural exposure to a sexually objectifying gaze. This psychological phenomenon is known as self-objectification. People engage in habitual, anticipatory body monitoring as they come to value their bodies more for their external utility and appearance than for their internal states or abilities.

This persistent self-surveillance has been shown empirically to fragment cognitive resources, interfere with flow states, and reduce awareness of internal body cues like hunger and heart rate. Additionally, chronic self-objectification is directly linked by objectification theory to increased psychological vulnerabilities, such as elevated levels of body shame, anxiety related to appearance, clinical depression, and disordered eating patterns. The framework's scope has since been expanded to assess how these dynamics appear in various demographics, such as men, racial minorities, and digital media environments. Although the initial framework was mainly concerned with women's internalized psychology, later empirical extensions have broadened its focus to assess how these structural dynamics appear as different behavioral and anatomical targets across localized demographics, creating distinct patterns of objectification for men and women.

== Sexual objectification of women ==
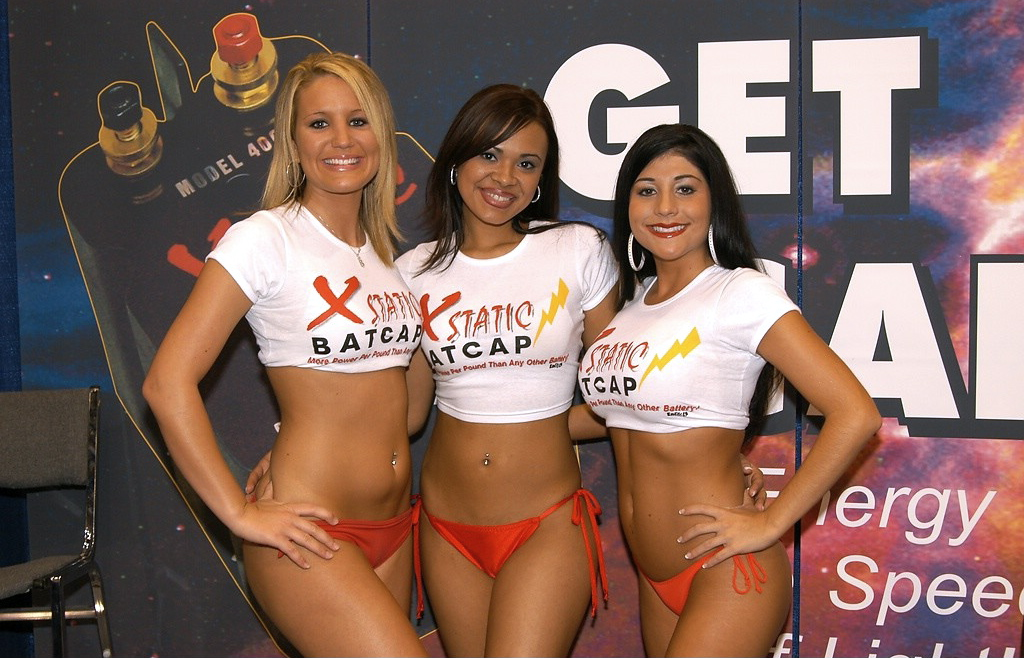
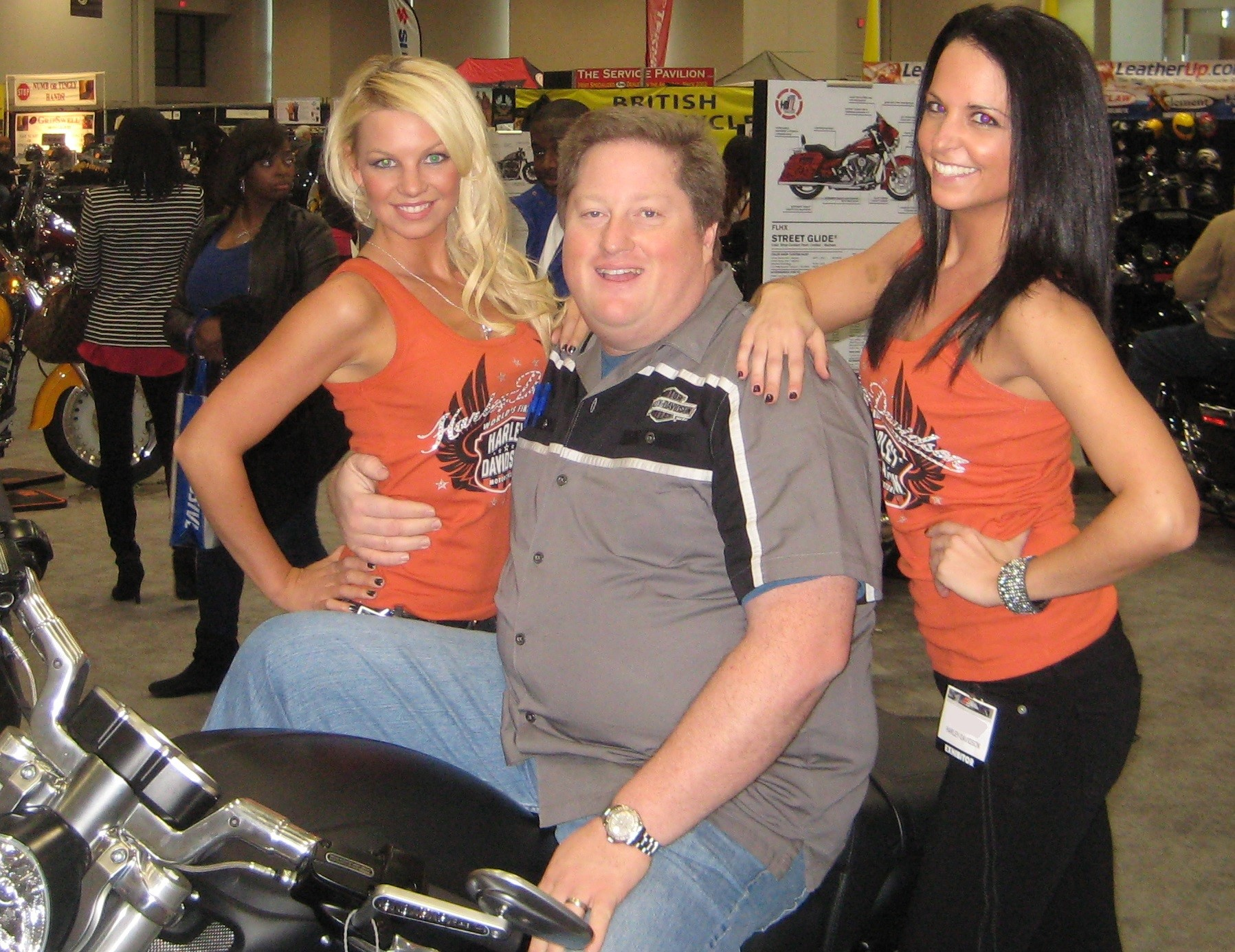
U.S. promotional models in bikini bottoms and crop tops advertise a car battery brand (top), and female models attract a male customer to a motorcycle brand (bottom).

The sexual objectification of women involves them being viewed primarily as an object of heteronormative male sexual desire, rather than as a whole person. Although opinions differ as to which situations are objectionable, many see the objectification of women taking place in the sexually oriented depictions of women in advertising, art and media, pornography, the occupations of stripping and prostitution, and women being brazenly evaluated or judged sexually or aesthetically in public spaces and events, such as beauty contests.

Some feminists and psychologists argue that sexual objectification can lead to negative psychological effects including eating disorders, depression and sexual dysfunction, and can give women negative self-images because of the belief that their intelligence and competence are currently not being, nor will ever be, acknowledged by society. Sexual objectification of women has also been found to negatively affect women's performance, confidence, and level of position in the workplace. How objectification has affected women and society in general is a topic of academic debate, with some saying girls' understanding of the importance of appearance in society may contribute to feelings of fear, shame, and disgust during the transition to womanhood, and others saying that young women are especially susceptible to objectification, as they are often taught that power, respect, and wealth can be derived from one's outward appearance.

== Sexual objectification of men ==
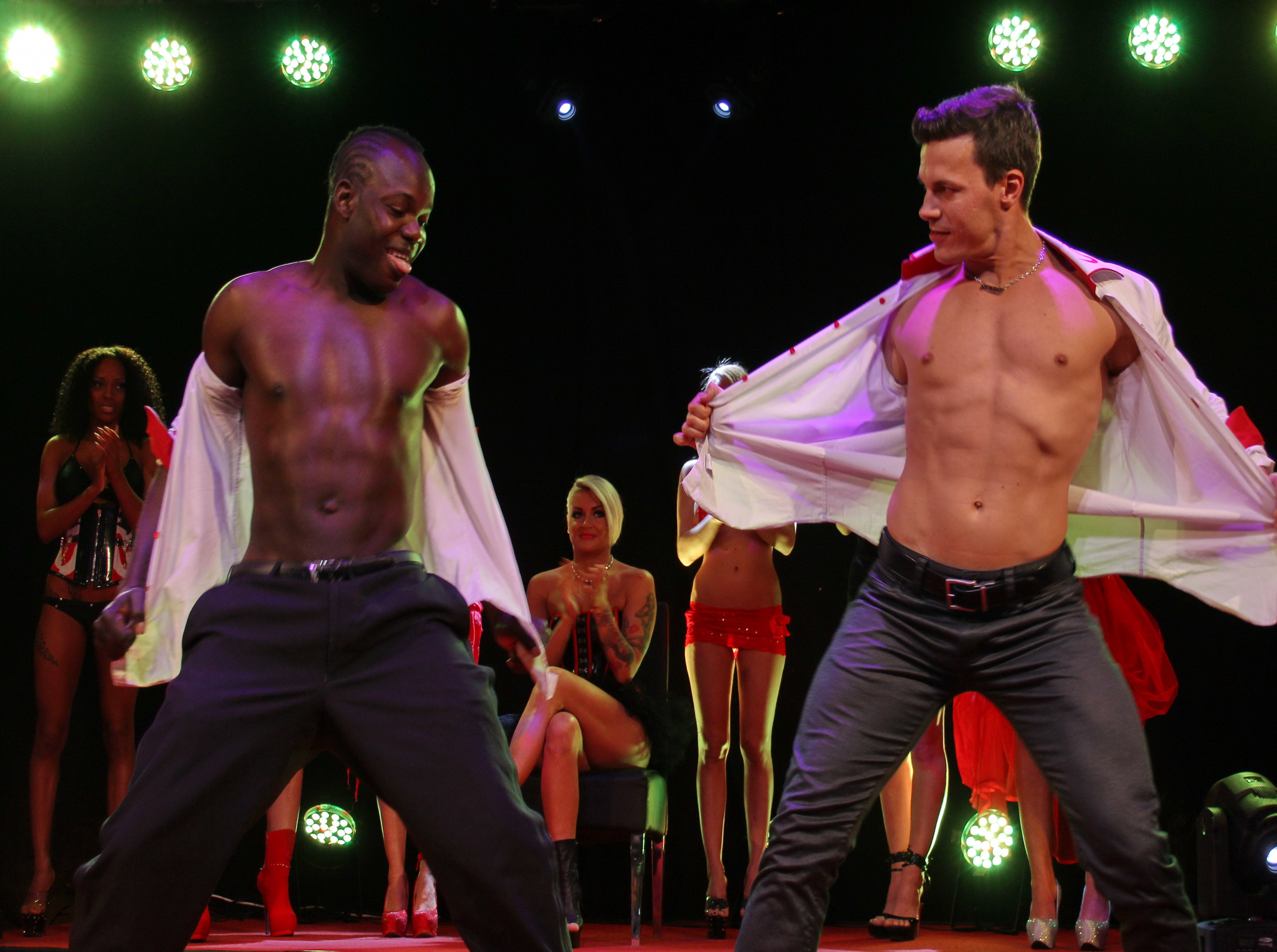
Male strippers are an example of the sexual objectification of men.

=== General ===
Instances where men may be viewed as sexualized can be in advertisements, music videos, films, television shows, beefcake calendars, women's magazines, male strip shows, and clothed female/nude male (CFNM) events. Women also purchase and consume pornography.

Within gay male communities, men are often objectified. In 2007 a study found discussing negative effects of objectification was met with considerable resistance in the community. The sexual objectification of men of colour may force them to play specific roles in sexual encounters that are not necessarily of their own choosing.

Research suggests that the psychological effects of objectification on men are similar to those of women, leading to negative body image among men.

=== Media ===
Men's bodies have become more objectified than they previously were, though because of society's established gaze on the objectification of women, the newfound objectification of men is not as widespread. Even with this increase of male objectification, men are still seen as the dominant figures and so the focus is still primarily on women.

Male sexual objectification has been found in 37% of advertisements featuring men's body parts to showcase a product. Similar to the issues of sexual objectification in women, it is common for said objectification to lead men to body shaming, eating disorders, and a drive for perfection. The continued exposure of these "ideal" men subject society to expect all men to fit this role.

Male actors featured in TV shows and movies are oftentimes in excellent shape and have the "ideal" bodies. These men often fill the leading roles. When society is subjected to men who do not have ideal bodies, we typically see them as the comic relief. It is rare to see an out of shape man have a leading role. Leanne Dawson writes that "There are temporal, cultural and geographical "norms" of gender and other aspects of identity, which are often incorrectly considered to be inherent or natural."

In the media, the ideal version of a man is seen as a strong, toned man. The idealized version of a woman is thin. Body evaluation is more commonly used to criticize women than men, and it can take different forms for men. For example, body evaluation is often directed at men's nonverbal cues. By contrast, women more often are subject to body evaluation in the form of sexual, sometimes offensive, verbal remarks. Men tend to experience this from other men, whereas women experience it from both sexes. The Interpersonal Sexual Objectification Scale (ISOS) is a scale that shows sexual objectification of respondents, both men and women. While experiencing sexual objectification, it creates the need to constantly maintain and critique one's physical appearance. This leads to other things like eating disorders, body shaming, and anxiety. The ISOS scale can be related to objectification theory and sexism. Self-objectification, which is the way in which people evaluate themselves, is concentrated more on women. Men typically experience it through media display. To the extent that men do experience self-objectification, studies have shown that men typically do not experience its negative effects to the extent that women do.

In the media, sexual objectification has been used as a way to sell products to the general public. Sexual objectification has been used as a marketing strategy for many decades according to the Journal of Advertising. This specific strategy targets the public in selling products that will make them look and feel desirable and attractive. It is stated that this strategy sells well by grabbing the attention of the public. The journal states that explicit advertisements do better in marketing than other non-explicit ads.

== Global prevalence and cross-cultural viewpoints ==
Although its expression, prevalence, and psychological internalization differ significantly across socio-cultural contexts, a substantial body of cross-cultural research shows that sexual objectification is a worldwide phenomenon. In the past, objectification theory-based empirical research has mostly focused on Western industrialized populations, especially those in the United States. Subsequent international research, however, has broadened the geographical focus to assess how various cultural factors—such as gender equality, individualism-collectivism, and traditional religious values—moderate the objectification of oneself and others.

Cultural frameworks have a significant influence on both self-objectification and the objectification of others, according to a thorough seven-nation study that included Australia, India, Italy, Japan, Pakistan, the United Kingdom, and the United States. The study found that compared to non-Western or collectivistic countries like India, Japan, and Pakistan, sexual objectification is more prevalent and overt in traditional Western countries like Australia, Italy, the UK, and the US. Even though the baseline tendencies are culturally moderated, the sexualization of an individual consistently decreased the amount of rational mind and moral concern attributed to them by observers across all surveyed cultures, confirming that the cognitive link between sexualization and dehumanization operates globally.

Empirical research in East Asian contexts, like Japan, demonstrates a direct correlation between higher levels of state self-objectification among young women and the pervasive exposure to objectifying interpersonal environments and media formats. This internalized self-objectification frequently leads to habitual body monitoring and subsequent disordered eating behaviors among Japanese college-aged populations and women in their twenties, which is consistent with the pathway models established in Western literature. Furthermore, regardless of localized legal or social attitudes toward adult entertainment, frequent consumption of pornography significantly correlates with sexually objectifying attitudes and behaviors across all four countries, according to multinational structural equation modeling analyzing behaviors in Germany, South Korea, Taiwan, and the United States.

== Views on sexual objectification ==
While the concept of sexual objectification is important within feminist theory, ideas vary widely on what constitutes sexual objectification and what are the ethical implications of such objectification. Some feminists such as Naomi Wolf find the concept of physical attractiveness itself to be problematic, with some radical feminists being opposed to any evaluation of another person's sexual attractiveness based on physical characteristics. John Stoltenberg goes so far as to condemn as wrongfully objectifying any sexual fantasy that involves the visualization of a woman.

Radical feminists view objectification as playing a central role in reducing women to what they refer to as the "oppressed sex class". While some feminists view mass media in societies that they argue are patriarchal as objectifying, they often focus on pornography as playing an egregious role in habituating men to objectify women.

Cultural critics such as Robert Jensen and Sut Jhally accuse mass media and advertising of promoting the objectification of women to help promote goods and services, and the television and film industries are commonly accused of normalizing the sexual objectification of women.

The objection to the objectification of women is not a recent phenomenon. In the French Enlightenment, for example, there was a debate as to whether a woman's breasts were merely a sensual enticement or rather a natural gift. In Alexandre Guillaume Mouslier de Moissy's 1771 play The True Mother (La Vraie Mère), the title character rebukes her husband for treating her as merely an object for his sexual gratification: "Are your senses so gross as to look on these breasts – the respectable treasures of nature – as merely an embellishment, destined to ornament the chest of women?"

The issues concerning sexual objectification became first problemized during the 1970s by feminist groups. Since then, it has been argued that the phenomenon of female sexual objectification has increased drastically since its problematization in all levels of life, and has resulted in negative consequences for women, especially in the political sphere. However, a rising form of new third-waver feminist groups have also taken the increased objectification of women as an opportunity to use the female body as a mode of power.

Some social conservatives have taken up aspects of the feminist critique of sexual objectification. In their view, however, the increase in the sexual objectification of both sexes in Western culture is one of the negative legacies of the sexual revolution. These critics, notably Wendy Shalit, advocate a return to pre-sexual revolution standards of sexual morality, which Shalit refers to as a "return to modesty", as an antidote to sexual objectification. Some social conservatives have argued that the feminist movement itself has contributed to the problem of the sexual objectification of women by promoting "free" love (i.e. men and women choosing to have non-reproductive sex outside of marriage and for their own pleasure).

Others such as civil libertarians and sex-positive feminists contest feminist claims about the objectification of women. Camille Paglia holds that "[t]urning people into sex objects is one of the specialties of our species." In her view, objectification is closely tied to (and may even be identical with) the highest human faculties toward conceptualization and aesthetics. Feminist author Wendy Kaminer criticized feminist support for anti-pornography laws, arguing that pornography does not cause sexual violence, and bans on such material infantilize women. She has noted that radical feminists have often allied themselves with the Christian right in supporting these laws and denouncing the depiction of sex in popular culture although the two groups strongly disagree on virtually everything else. Her ACLU colleagues Nadine Strossen and Nan D. Hunter have made similar criticisms. Strossen has argued that objectification is not in and of itself dehumanizing, and may fulfill women's own fantasies. Psychologist Nigel Barber argues that men, and to a lesser extent, women, are naturally inclined to focus on the physical attractiveness of the opposite sex (or the same sex in the case of gays and lesbians), and that this has been widely misinterpreted as sexism.

=== Female self-objectification ===
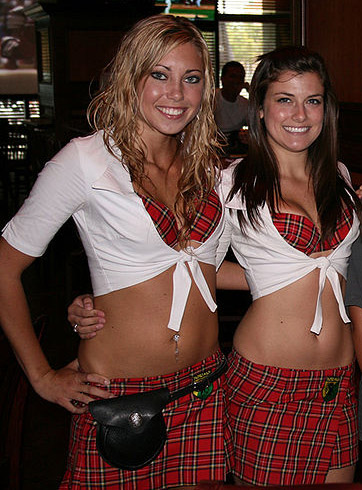
Waitresses of Tilted Kilt Pub & Eatery restaurant in uniform. Tilted Kilt has skimpily dressed waitresses, and is thus an example of a breastaurant.

Ariel Levy contends that Western women who exploit their sexuality by, for example, wearing revealing clothing and engaging in lewd behavior, engage in female self-objectification, meaning they objectify themselves. While some women see such behavior as a form of empowerment, Levy contends that it has led to greater emphasis on a physical criterion or sexualization for women's perceived self-worth, which Levy calls "raunch culture".

Levy discusses this phenomenon in Female Chauvinist Pigs: Women and the Rise of Raunch Culture. Levy followed the camera crew from the Girls Gone Wild video series, and argues that contemporary America's sexualized culture not only objectifies women, it encourages women to objectify themselves. In today's culture, Levy writes, the idea of a woman participating in a wet T-shirt contest or being comfortable watching explicit pornography has become a symbol of feminist strength.

Jordan Peterson has asked why women need to wear make-up or high-heels in the workplace, that a double standard exists for sexual harassment and women who self-objectify themselves in society.

Social media has made a major impact on the self-objectification of women. Through social media, women self-objectify by posting provocative images they know will be objectified by their viewers as a form of seeking validation of posting images that fits the mold of society.

=== Latina women ===
Latina women face a particular form of sexual objectification based on stereotypes relating to Latina women. American media often portrays Latina women as being sexually promiscuous and curvaceous, having large breasts and buttocks, being melodramatic, or having a feisty attitude. Keller identifies three main stereotypes that contribute to the objectification of Latinas. (Cantina Girl, Suffering Senorita, and Vamp). The "Cantina Girl" is characterized as being an alluring sexual presence. The "Suffering Senorita" is the Latina who goes "bad" due to her love of the (usually Anglo) love interest. Lastly, the "Vamp" is seen as beautiful but devious, and a psychological threat for her wit or charm. All three of these categorizations stem from the sexual objectification of Latina women's bodies and identities.

Such sexual objectifications hold real-world consequences for Latina women. For instance, the prevalence of negative Latina stereotypes (such as hypersexualization) has led to a decrease in positive in-group attitudes among the Latina community.

=== Black women ===
Black women have been fetishized and objectified throughout history. They may be portrayed as having a more animalistic nature than their non-black counterparts. People who fetishize black women are sometimes pejoratively said to have "jungle fever".

Black women are widely objectified in the media and in pornography, and are scrutinized more closely for doing the same things as their non-black counterparts. They are also stereotyped in the media as having more curvaceous bodies and bigger lips.

== Alternatives and critique ==
Ann J. Cahill uses the concept of derivitization as an alternative to objectification when trying to address sexual objectification's seeming judgment of all physical interactions (termed somatophobia by Cahill). Cahill criticizes the notion of objectification as marginalizing the role of the body in one's subjective experience and therefore making it impossible to understand how being viewed as a sexually appealing body can enhance an individual's notion of self.

Instead, Cahill uses the concept of subjectivity from the study of intersubjectivity. A subject is an individual with their unique experience of reality. Derivitization is then defined as limiting another person's subjective behavior and experience to align with or serve your own subjective experience. In this framing, the objectification exists in sex work is viewed instead as the derivitization of having another act for only one's own subjective experience and ignoring the sex worker's experience. Drawing comparisons to the doctor–patient relationship, Cahill argues that a recognition of what both people bring to a relationship and their subjective goals is what makes a relationship ethical.

"Free use" describes a sexual fetish involving being consensually "used" as a sex-object at any time and anywhere by a sexual partner when they are aroused, including while doing chores or while sleeping. It became popular online in the mid-2020s, including in gay pornography, on Reddit – where one subreddit dedicated to the fetish had over 1.4 million members by 2023 – and on TikTok.

== See also ==
- Exploitation of women in mass media
- Human furniture
- Male gaze
- Pornification
- Rape culture
- Sex in advertising
- Sexuality in music videos
- Sex in film
- Sexualization of women athletes in sports broadcasting
