= Pornification =

Mainstream absorption of sexualisation

Pornification is the absorption by mainstream culture of styles or content of the sex industry and the sexualisation of Western culture, sometimes referred to as raunch culture. Pornification, particularly the use of sexualised images of women, is said to demonstrate "how patriarchal power operates in the field of gender representation". In Women in Popular Culture, Marion Meyers argues that the portrayal of women in modern society is primarily influenced by "the mainstreaming of pornography and its resultant hypersexualization of women and girls, and the commodification of those images for a global market". Pornification also features in discussions of post-feminism by Ariel Levy, Natasha Walter, Feona Attwood, and Brian McNair. Pornography began to move into mainstream culture in the second half of the 20th century, known as the Golden Age of Porn. Several Golden Age films referred to mainstream film titles, including "Alice in Wonderland" (1976), "Flesh Gordon" (1974), "The Opening of Misty Beethoven" (1976) and "Through the Looking Glass" (1976).

== Effects on culture ==
Bernadette Barton, Professor of Sociology and Gender Studies at Morehead State University, cites as examples of "raunch culture" there being little consequence for Donald Trump's own words regarding his treatment of women; or his wife's past behavior as a model. Pole dancing has become a form of exercise for suburban women, and sexually suggestive words find their way into everyday public statements.

== Effects of media ==
=== Advertising ===
Advertising by Carl's Jr. in 2016 featuring scantily clad women and suggestive language were replaced by a "food-centric" approach in 2019, the change attributed to the MeToo movement.

=== Books ===
Literature which people read for sexual satisfaction was one of the earliest forms of media portraying sexuality. There are a variety of websites to satisfy most sexual preferences and tastes. Erotica was an early form of social protest against the values of culture, for example the book The Romance of Lust, written as a few volumes between 1873 and 1876. Described in the book are homosexuality, incest, and other socially unacceptable concepts. The values of the Victorian era perpetuated purity and innocence. So this book offered a new perspective. In recent years, erotica has become the new norm, and is extremely popular. A recent commercial success is Fifty Shades of Grey, describing in detail scenes of sadomasochism and other forms of kink. It sold over "31 million worldwide", and has been adapted into a film starring Dakota Johnson and Jamie Dornan.

=== Film ===
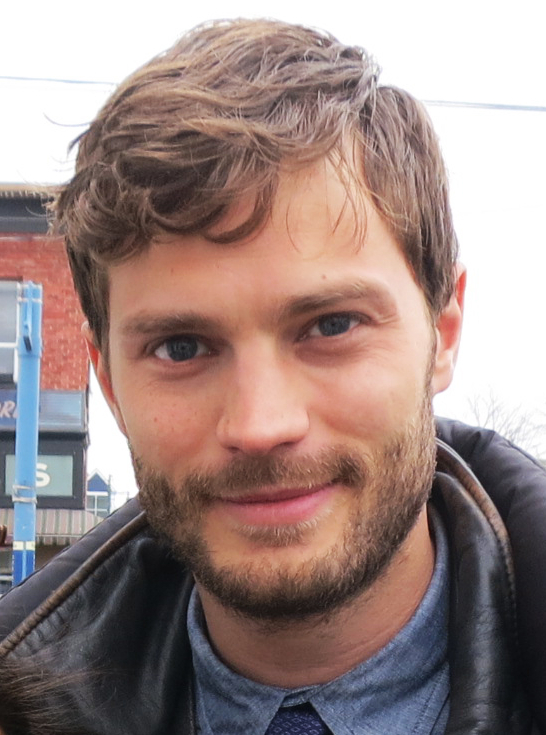
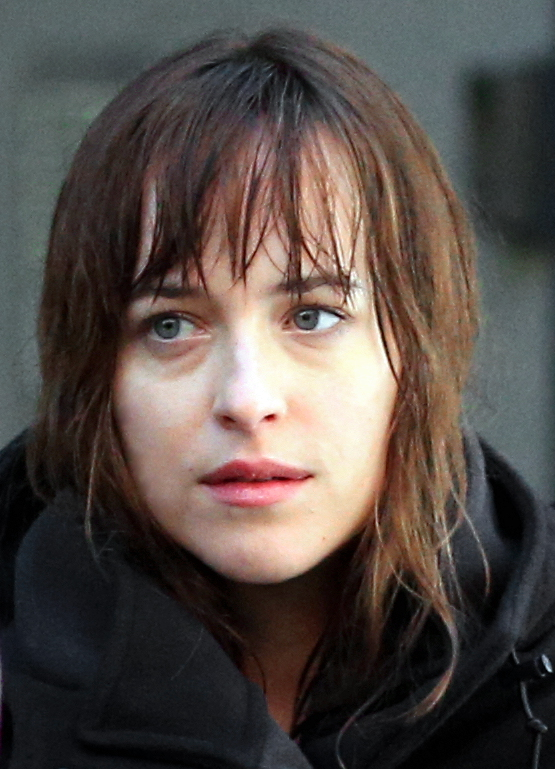
Jamie Dornan and Dakota Johnson were cast in the lead roles in the BDSM inspired film, Fifty Shades of Grey.

The real-life effects of watching film sex and violence have been heavily disputed. While some groups argue that media violence causes viewers to be more violent, there is no academic consensus on this and indeed large studies suggest that there is no causative link between images of violence and violence in spectators, nor between images of sex and sexual behavior. The links between films and spectator behavior are complex and while pornography undoubtedly plays a big role in how people view sex and relationships, we should always be wary of attributing a single source (e.g. pornography) to a single action (e.g. sexual violence) as human behavior is so much more complex than this.

=== Television ===
Teens who were exposed to highly sexual content on TV were more likely to "act older" than their age. If what was being shown on TV was educational, it could yield a positive result on teenagers. For example, on one specific episode of Friends, which had nearly 2 million viewers at the time, one of the characters had gotten pregnant even after using contraception. After the episode, teens were actually more likely to engage in safer sexual activity, and as much as 65% remembered what was in that episode.

== See also ==
- Female Chauvinist Pigs
- Rule 34 (Internet meme)
- Sexualization
- Sexual objectification
