= No White Saviors =

Ugandan social campaign

No White Saviors is an anti-white saviorism social media campaign, predominantly present on Instagram. It was launched by two social workers in 2018.

== History ==
The No White Saviors social media campaign was launched in 2018 by social workers Olivia Alaso and Kelsey Nielsen. Alaso is a black Ugandan and Nielsen is a white American.

The campaign advocated against the use of images of black children on social media, with notable critiques of the online activities of British television presenter Stacey Dooley (in 2019), American missionary Renée Bach, and German Bernhard ‘Bery’ Glaser. The organisation held its first conference in 2019, in Kampala.

By 2021, No White Saviors' Instagram accounts had attracted 930,000 followers and the team had launched a podcast.

In 2022, Nielsen faced accusations of white saviorism and abuse of power, leading to her resigning from the organisation. In August 2022, the organisation was restructuring with an all-black leadership team.
