= Serving His Children =

Christian nonprofit

Serving His Children (SHC) is a Christian nonprofit organization, based in Jinja, Uganda. It was started by Renée Bach in 2009. Her nonprofit began as a free meal service and later expanded to provide free medical treatment for malnourished children as well as advocacy work for the malnourished. Bach did not have a license to practice medicine, or run a clinic. Bach's work has been marred with allegations of recklessness and incompetency. Bach has denied many allegations and stated that she never presented herself as a doctor—as she has no formal training.

In 2019, a lawsuit was bought against her by two mothers who alleged that Serving His Children were responsible for their children's deaths. It was settled in 2020, with both mothers receiving around $9,500, and with no admission of liability from Serving His Children. Following the first lawsuit, the Uganda Medical and Dental Practitioners Council conducted an independent investigation. They were "unable to support allegations that children died in large numbers due to the services of Serving His Children" and "did not find evidence that Ms. Renée Bach, Director of Serving His Children, was treating children."

== History ==
In 2007, while a teenager, Bach went on an evangelical missionary trip to Jinja, Uganda, to work at a missionary-run orphanage, where she stayed for nine months. After returning from the trip in 2009, Bach stated that she felt "like there was something that [she] was supposed to do", and decided to return to Jinja to start a charity organization through funds raised by local church circles in Bedford, believing it was God's calling for her. She later stated that she traveled to Uganda with a "white savior" mentality. Originally based in a home Bach had rented in the Masese district of Jinja, the organization started out by providing neighborhood children free biweekly meals, and the charity eventually came to be called Serving His Children (SHC). She often drove ill children to Nalufenya, the local pediatric hospital. After word spread of the charity throughout Jinja, a staffer from Nalufenya asked for Bach's help with their severely malnourished children, leading Bach to turn the house she had rented into a nutrition center wherein these malnourished children could be restored back to health while their parents lived there. The group's mission statement claimed it was "working to end malnutrition in families and communities" and "partner[ing] with the government of Uganda to provide inpatient therapeutic care for children suffering from severe acute malnutrition".

In 2011, SHC was registered as a non-governmental organization in the country. By this time, Bach had stocked the center with medical equipment and had hired several Ugandan nurses during the day. However, she had hired no doctors, nor had she obtained a health license for the center. Therefore, Bach herself had taken control of much of the care that took place at the center. According to multiple testimonies from those involved with SHC, Bach purported herself to be a trained medical professional while working at the center, personally administering intravenous drips into the veins of patients and performing blood transfusions despite her complete lack of professional training. According to former SHC volunteer and American registered nurse Jacqueline Grace Kramlich, Bach ignored practices including hand washing and glove-wearing, defied local doctors' orders—believing she knew better, and that God would instruct her. She carried out various procedures without oversight from a doctor, and based her practice on her "gut feelings" and referenced the book, Where There Is No Doctor to inform herself, despite being written in the 1970's. In a deleted blog post from Bach, she wrote that she administered oxygen to a child whose temperature, blood sugar and hemoglobin were checked. The child reportedly received an intravenous drip and blood transfusion.

Many of the children brought to SHC were suffering from conditions that the center was not qualified to deal with, including malaria, pneumonia, and tuberculosis, and were only permitted by Ugandan law and international guidelines to be treated in a higher-level health center. In 2011, 20 percent of the children in SHC's care died, which some attribute to the lack of trained medical staff at SHC. The death rate dropped to 18 percent the following year, and, after Bach hired two doctors at the nutrition center in 2013, it fell to 10 percent. Gideon Wamasebu, the district health officer of Manafwa, worked with SHC in 2012 and said that it was he, not Bach, who was in charge of overseeing patients at that time.

In 2013, Bach's mother was named the director of Serving His Children. By 2014, it had become a licensed health facility in the Jinja district, though the license expired by the end of the year. The facility was shut down in 2015 following complaints and a two-hour inspection.

In 2017, SHC, in partnership with Uganda's Ministry of Health, opened an inpatient treatment center in Mayuge District and began outpatient treatment services for malnourished children. Community support was later offered. In 2019, Bach stepped down from her role as Serving His Children's program director, temporarily returning to the United States in a volunteer role to help fundraise for her organization's team in Uganda. The following year she said she would no longer practice medicine in Uganda and announced the dissolution of SHC.

== Medical activities ==
Former worker Semei Jolley Kyebanakola claimed that Bach "encouraged mothers to escape" from a children's hospital in Jinja and bring their babies to her facility for treatment instead. He also asserted that she was often seen wearing a stethoscope and said she also wore a "clinical coat." Bach denied his claim of helping mothers escape, noting that due to his profession as a gardener he had limited contact with the children. She also stated that he was aware that she was not versed in medicine.

Charles Olweny, the former field manager, raised concerns over the alleged "high death rate": "On average, I would drive at least seven to ten dead bodies of children back to their villages each week." Bach denied this and showed that from 2010 to 2018, 119 deaths out of 3,596 total patients occurred a rate of 3.3%, lower than the average 20–30% rate when dealing with malnourishment. NPR reported the death rate in 2011 as 20% and 10% in 2013; from 2010 to 2015, 105 children died out of all total of 940 treated.

== Lawsuits ==
On January 21, 2019, a lawsuit was filed in the High Court of Uganda by the Women's Probono Initiative, an advocacy group that provides free legal services to women in Uganda. They sought monetary damages for two mothers whose children died in Bach's care, as well as accountability for 105 other cases. They filed the case on a basis of human-rights violations and of class discrimination.

The first mother named in the lawsuit, Zubeda Gimbo, said that a woman affiliated with SHC collected her son for treatment; he died three days later. He had malaria, a respiratory infection, anemia, and dehydration from diarrhea. Gimbo was compensated with USh 50,000/= (roughly US$13.50). Zuriah Namutamba, Gimbo's mother, claimed that Bach administered medicine to him and placed him on oxygen. Bach was not in Uganda at the time. Gimbo and other mothers were under the impression that Bach was a trained doctor.

The second mother named in the lawsuit, Annet Kakai, said that she was advised, by a woman named Futama, to take her year-old son to a facility for feeding. Before doing so, Kakai was informed that he had tuberculosis. Upon arriving at the facility, a woman—later identified as Bach—collected him, in an hour dismissed them and said to come back the next day. When they returned, SHC staff drove them to a state-run medical center. They were discharged two days later without any further instructions or medication for her son. SHC staff compensated Kakai with USh.2,000/= (less than $1). Her son soon became ill and died three days later. Kakai believed that SHC were responsible for his death. Bach responded by saying that there was no one named Futama who worked for the nonprofit and no records showed him being admitted to SHC. Both mothers supported the claim that Bach was often seen in medical clothing, with a stethoscope.

In July 2020, the lawsuit reached an out-of-court settlement; $9,500 to each of the mothers and SHC being deemed not responsible for either child's death. Bach has stated her belief that the lawsuit was the result of personal "vendetta" by former employees and members of the community who disliked her.

Advocacy group No White Saviors have said that they seek to file cases against SHC. In January 2021, four Ugandan families sued SHC for the deaths of three children; No White Saviors had raised $16,000 to pay legal fees for the families.

=== Media response ===
After the initial lawsuit was filed, the story was reported by international media; NPR, The Guardian, NBC News, Good Morning America, and ABC News all ran stories. Bach issued a response on the Fox News Network, saying, "I have assisted our medical teams in emergency settings and in crisis situations but I have never practiced medicine and I have never adorned or put on any sort of uniform, a white coat. It is a tough allegation. " Local newspapers in Virginia reported that Bach was accused of actions "leading to the deaths of hundreds of children." Journalists from Ireland, the Netherlands, Germany and Australia were all present in the courtroom. In 2020, a podcast produced by iHeartRadio investigated the story, including interviews with both Bach and Ugandan healthcare workers.

In 2023, a documentary series Savior Complex revolving around the story, featuring Bach, premiered on September 26, 2023, on HBO.

=== Investigation ===
Following the first lawsuit, the Uganda Medical and Dental Practitioners Council conducted an independent investigation. They were "unable to support allegations that children died in large numbers due to the services of S.H.C" and "did not find evidence that Ms. Renée Bach, Director of S.H.C., was treating children.", and stated that the local community and health workers "were appreciative of her work".

== See also ==
- Katie Davis (missionary)
