= Madonna and sexuality =

Aspect of American singer's career

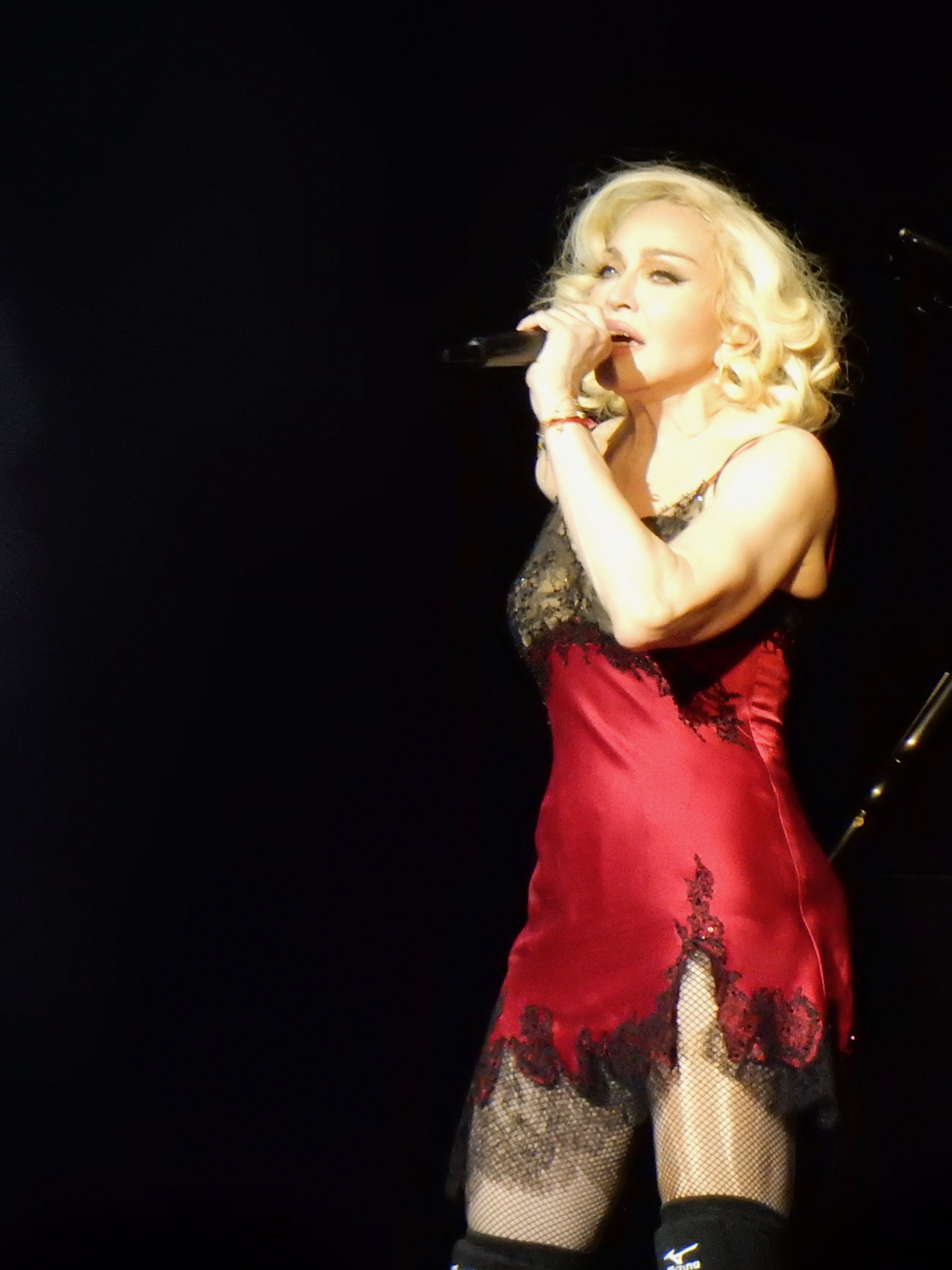
Madonna on stage during The Celebration Tour in 2023

American singer-songwriter Madonna has been considered a sexual icon. Various have considered Madonna's sexuality as one of the focal points of her career. The Oxford Dictionary of English (2010) credited her image as a sex symbol as a source of her international stardom. Her sexual displays have drawn numerous analyses by scholars, sexologists, feminists, and other authors. Due to her use of explicit sexual content, she faced censorship for her videos, stage performances and other projects, in addition to generate and receive religious and political criticisms. During the AIDS epidemic, Madonna advocated for safe sex.

Critical responses to her sexuality have extended beyond assessments of her individual career. Depending on the reviewer's perspective, she is credited with either reinforcing or expanding ways of expression in mass media culture. American historian Lilly J. Goren was inclined to conclude that Madonna perpetuated the public perception of women performers as sexualized objects, while the music industry simultaneously exploited her use of sexuality as a form of empowerment to increase record sales. Other commentators have examined Madonna's influence on later female artists and her public, while feminist scholars Cheris Kramarae and Dale Spender concluded "she created an illusion of sexual availability that many female pop artists felt compelled to emulate". Although she was generally regarded as highly controversial, Madonna was also compared to both contemporary and earlier performers who used sexuality as part of their public persona and artistic presentation.

Madonna was described in various ways in the media in relation to her sexual persona, often characterized pejoratively, and was compared to a Medusa, succubus and the Whore of Babylon. Public figures such as Steve Allen and Morrissey also commented on Madonna's sexuality, both comparing her to a prostitute. Her sex appeal was recognized in rankings, including Toronto Sun's 50 Greatest Sex Symbols in history (2006) and VH1's 100 Sexiest Artists (2002).

== Critical development ==
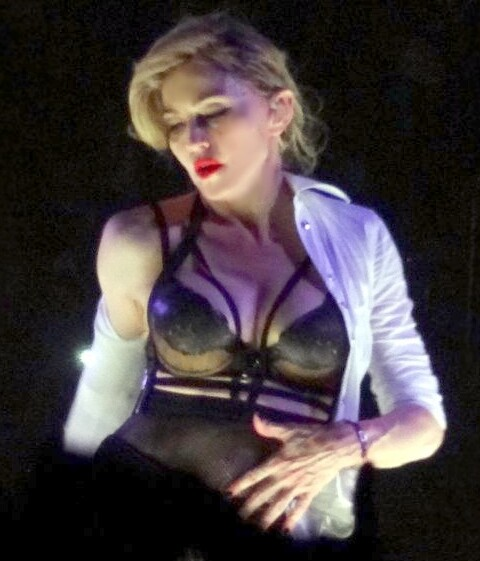
Madonna on stage in her MDNA Tour in 2012

Madonna has been referred to as a sexual icon or sex symbol; media outlets such as American Masters, suggest that the singer continued to be a sexual icon as "she's gotten older". The Oxford Dictionary of English (2010) credited her image as a sex symbol as a source of her international stardom. In 2011, author Glenn Ward said that it was "often been implied" that Madonna's status was produced in part from the way she willfully deployed images of sexuality.

=== Press and public ===
In 2006, Ottawa Citizen's Dunlevy T'cha, said that "many critics" seen her "variously", including embodying the "contradictions of a society fascinated by fame [or] ambivalent about sexuality". In Record Collecting for Girls (2011), Courtney Smith documented that most people associate Madonna with sex. Vulture's Meaghan Garvey summarized at least in her first 20 years of career, "no one talked about Madonna without talking about sex".

By the late 1980s, physicist Stephen Hawking even name-checked the singer by joking: "I have sold more books on physics than Madonna has on sex". That perception was stronger in the 1990s; author Mark Bego reflected "since her arrival on the scene ten years ago, Madonna has become so synonymous with sex (and publicity) that it may be hard to remember that she started as a musical phenomenon." The 1996 edition of the Hutchinson Encyclopedia referred to her as a "U.S. pop singer and actress who presents herself on stage and in videos with an exaggerated sexuality". In The Thirty Years' Wars (1996), Andrew Kopkind regarded Madonna as "the premier sex symbol of the decade" (1990s), while Sara Mills cited a commentary about Madonna: "write off Madonna as 'just another sex symbol' is to fail to understand her massive appeal". In 2000, Brian McCollum from Knight Ridder made a comparative in AlltheWeb's results using the phrases "Madonna and music" which garnered 235,000 hits and "Madonna and sex" landing more than 333,000 results.

Her sexuality also made her a tabloid-fixture. In Profiles of Female Genius (1994), author Gene Landrum describes that Madonna's libidinal energy and sexuality become in her major attraction for the media and "it has become the focal point for her whole career". Madonna herself noted the "bad press" about her sexuality as early as 1985. Historian Andrea Stuart cited a tabloid headline where she was called a "man-eater" and how "used sex to climb to the top". Author Adam Sexton called some press pieces as a "creepy moralism". In the compendium The Madonna Connection (1993), scholars wrote there were persistent rumors of Madonna to be HIV-positive. They wrote that certain segments of society find comfort in identifying her as a carrier of the AIDS virus—a disease perceived as a punishment for immoral behavior— and making Madonna HIV-positive establishes her moral guilt and provides for her ultimate containment by death.

=== Scholarly ===
The Madonna studies saw a framework of its developments in theories about sexuality, although Rosemary Pringle from Griffith University, wrote in Transitions: New Australian feminisms (2020), that "there has been much controversy in the academy about the cultural and sexual politics of Madonna". Her notoriety, was commented on by Chuck Klosterman in Sex, Drugs, and Cocoa Puffs (2004): "Whenever I hear intellectuals talk about sexual icons of the present day, the name mentioned most is Madonna".

Citing Steven Anderson's views on Madonna in 1989, qualifying her as "a repository of all our ideas" on topics such as sex, Deborah Jermyn in Female Celebrity and Ageing (2016) wrote Madonna still functions as a repository of all of these ideas, except now she plays with these in an aging body. In 2018, sexologist Ana Fernández Alonso from Miguel de Cervantes European University, taught in a Madonna's class in the University of Oviedo that she is an "important" icon for women and for the way of understanding human sexuality in general, and sexual relations in particular. However, Mandy Merck from Royal Holloway in Perversions: Deviant Readings by Mandy Merck (1993), said that although Madonna was seen as perhaps "the most self-authored sexual artifact of this (or any other) time", her career coincides with long-held positions on pornography, fashion and sexual conduct.

== Madonna's AIDS advocacy ==
Madonna had promoted safe sex awareness in the 1980s and 1990s during the AIDS crisis in the U.S. as a means of inhibiting the spread of the virus, and continued to do the same in the next years, as reported Jason Mattera. In Madonna as Postmodern Myth (2002), French scholar Georges-Claude Guilbert concurred saying she often reminds her public during interviews and concerts to use condoms. Frances Negrón-Muntaner, commented in Boricua Pop (2004), she used her concerts to promote safe sex as a "remember the dead, and affirm the living". Editors of History+ for Edexcel A Level (2015), summed up that "she talked a great deal about sex, promoted safe sex in her interviews, distributed condoms at her concerts and performed at AIDS benefits". Upon the publication of her first book, Sex (1992), Madonna stated that if people "could talk about [sex] freely, we would have more people practicing safe sex, we wouldn't have people sexually abusing each other".

Madonna donated a percentage of "Papa Don't Preach" (1986) profits to programs advocating sexual responsibility, although it was Planned Parenthood of New York that initially requested her to do this. In a 1988 advertisement for schoolkids, Madonna told "avoid casual sex and you'll avoid AIDS" and "stay away from people who shoot drugs". In the early 1990s, Sire Records had a 900 hotline (900-990-SIRE) that featured a safe-sex message from Madonna. During this decade, she also mentioned about unsafe sex: "I'm not going to sit here and say that from the time I found out about AIDS, I've always had intercourse with a man with a condom on". American professor and critic, Louis Menand called her "a leading spokesperson for safe sex" in his book American Studies (2003).

== Madonna's sexual identity ==
=== Influences and comparisons ===
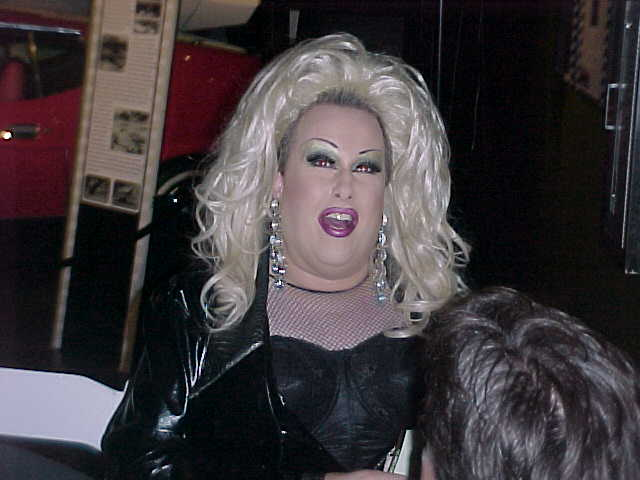
Madonna recruited people from the gay porn industry such as Joey Stefano and Chi Chi LaRue (pictured) to appear in various of her works.

Madonna's status as a sex symbol was often compared to other contemporary and earlier entertainers. PBS and Los Angeles Times observed that Madonna followed Mae West's footsteps in breaking taboos about sexuality. Other influences mentioned for Madonna by the public and media outlets included Marlene Dietrich. Around the 1990s, feminists noted that Madonna began to explore female sexual fantasies, according to The Madonna Connection (1993), incorporating bondage or sadomasochism through aesthetic expressions. The videos for "Erotica" and "Deeper and Deeper" echoed sadomasochistic motifs in pop artist Andy Warhol's underground films.

The author Stuart Jeffries in Everything, All the Time, Everywhere: How We Became Postmodern (2021), deemed Madonna as the leading sex symbol of the postmodern era, in contrast to Marilyn Monroe, whom he defined as the leading sex symbol of the modern era. Dylan Jones described her as "the most famous sex symbol since Marilyn Monroe".

=== Scope ===
In 1991, New Internationalist regarded Madonna as a "hotly debated sexual icon". Deborah Bell from University of North Carolina, wrote in Masquerade (2015), that "much has been written about Madonna and sexual identity". British media sociologist, David Gauntlett asserts Madonna's image as a sexual free spirit has been "emphatically defined".

Australian professor Jeff Lewis commented "more than any other single female figure, [she] has self-consciously 'explored' and displayed women's sexuality". In the early 1990s, Lisa Henderson from Pennsylvania State University even considered her as "the ultimately the epitome of women's sexuality ... at best ambiguous in the end". Scholar of sexuality studies John Paul De Cecco and Grant Lukenbill, considered she was "one of the first major performers to blanket America with sexual code-code used specifically to appeal to the entire panorama of sexual expression". In Madonna, Bawdy & Soul (1997), Canadian scholar Karlene Faith noted her far-reaching audience saying she "has inscribed her sexual identities on the psyches of millions of children, adolescents, and adults in dozens of nations, on half a dozen continents". Professor Santiago Fouz-Hernandez wrote in Madonna's Drowned Worlds (2004) that she symbolized "sexual liberation" for women in many cultures. On the other hand, Donald C. Miller, in Coming of Age in Popular Culture (2018), described that she consistently intertwined sexuality with religion, feeling it was something that set her apart from earlier female performers.

=== Madonna's usage of sexuality ===
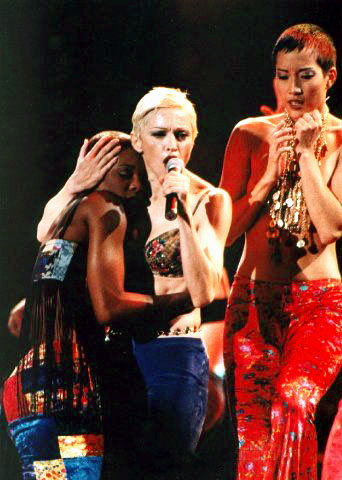
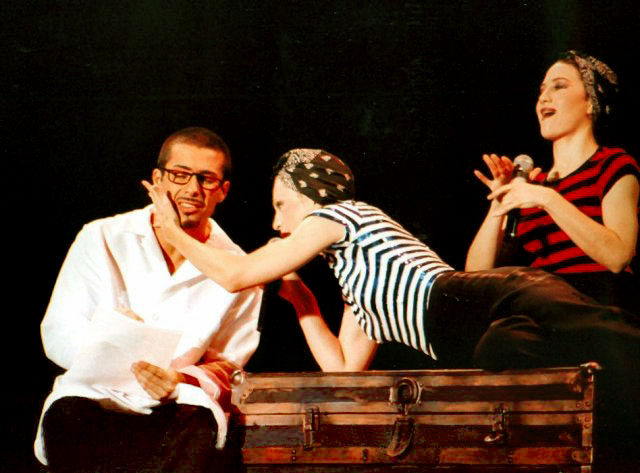
Madonna has used perceptions of sexual fluidity as part of her stage personas. In various of her performances, men were the sex objects. Various criticized her exhibitionism.

Shortly after her debut, Madonna's sexuality offered a challenge view to definitions of femininity and masculinity, according to author John Price. He continued saying that Madonna was a leading female figure who represented to many young women across the world, an "empowering figure" in control of her own body. American philosopher Susan Bordo, explains that the singer demonstrated her wannabes, the possibility of a female heterosexuality that was independent of patriarchal control. Meaghan Garven from Vulture magazine explained "her sexuality never rested on the idea of being attractive".

Different reviewers and academics in popular culture, further emphasized this stage of her career, with Gauntlett arguing that her sexual assertiveness "has been one of the most distinctive elements of her life and work". In Girl Heroes (2002), Susan Hopkins held she didn't only sell sexuality, but power, or rather "sexuality as power". Similarly, Camille Paglia described her "sexual persona" as "her power", while academic Marcel Danesi made also a remark on it. In 100 Entertainers Who Changed America (2013), Robert Sickels believes that in her 1980s-works, Madonna portrayed herself as the "modern woman": Comfortable in and gratified by her own sexuality, but still a powerful female. She took the idea further in her next decade, Sickels says. In Contesting Feminist Orthodoxies (1996), authors explained that the singer not only represented herself as a sexual subject/object, but expressly proposed sexuality as a praxis of and towards artistic freedom, women's liberation, and indeed, gay liberation. Psychiatrist and author Jule Eisenbud commented that she reached a level "equivalent to masculinity" and "has allowed her to maintain her status as a sex symbol". Psychologist Jonathan Young, expressed: "[...] through sexually muscular scenarios of female domination, Madonna turns feminine sexuality as it is conventionally defined inside out: she reveals the hidden fantasy within women's [...]".

The way she has deployed her sexuality while aging has continued to attract commentary. To Alina Simone in Madonnaland (2016), her brutal sexiness "would only become more so as time went on". In the early 2000s, Hopkins commented that she was "ageing before the world [...] but she keeps presenting herself as a kind of 'sexual revolutionary'". In 2008, Blender's editor-in-chief, Joe Levy commented about her entrance into the middle age, that "she is trying to go somewhere no one has gone before" with the possible exception of Cher. In 2018, music scholar Freya Jarman at the University of Liverpool felt Madonna was "demonstrating a new kind of relevance". In 2024, Eric Cabahug from The Post, says that her sexuality deployment shifted to against of "the ageist machine".

=== Social evaluations and criticisms ===
Madonna has been often criticized due her deployment of sexuality, by different sectors, including academics and mainstream media alike. In the early 1990s, Pennsylvania State University's Lisa Henderson elaborated that it became one of the reasons why some segments of society hate Madonna for challenging the sexual status quo. Media scholars Charlotte Brunsdon and Lynn Spigel, explained that she "inverted" or at least "challenged", America's notions of sex, gender and power exploring taboos. Essayist Hal Crowther described: "I think of Madonna as Roboslut, an alien programmed to conquer the earth by attacking our reproductive psychology".

She received attention of groupings like feminists. Some defined her sexuality as antifeminism, while different third-wave feminists who emerged in the 1990s, embraced Madonna as a symbol of female sexuality. Commenting about her divisive feminist reception, researcher Brian McNair held that "pro and anti-porn feminist made of her a symbol of all that was good or bad (depending on their viewpoint)". Paglia was one of her earliest feminist supporters.

During the height of her popularity, reactions and reception amid the youth culture of her time were addressed. Author Roy Shuker describes that her transgressions of sexuality was perhaps viewed as "extremely disturbing" or as a source of "pleasure" for others among her fandom. In the 1990s, James Naremore believes that some adolescent girls construct relevance between Madonna's sexuality and their own conditions of existence. English musicologist Sheila Whiteley observed positive reactions, citing that she was viewed by others as "acting responsibly" in bringing sex to the fore, so forcing the media, schools and parents alike to confront the "inconsistencies inherent" in the public attitude towards female sexuality. Providing a retrospective, Stephanie Rosenbloom from The New York Times explains her stance: "Never had we seen someone so bold, so powerful, so sexually aggressive who was not a man". Daryl Deino from The New York Observer made a similar observation in 2017, in which, defined her as a "conductor of her own" and deemed her as a revolutionary.

Through her career, Madonna's exhibitionism garnered her criticisms. In the early 1990s, American writer Lewis Grizzard, referred to the crotch grabbing as a "nasty trend" in which he included famous crotch-grabbers such as Madonna and Michael Jackson. Having mentioned both performers, author Therese Steffen, called it a common cultural code for sexual power and virility. Also, conservative outlet Liberty, Life, and Family criticized various popular A–list of entertainers in 1994, including Madonna, for having project androgynous images, and open sexuality, as part of their public persona and presentation and their influence in youngsters.

Her works of the 1990s "confirmed" or "intensified" her status as a sexually assertive and in-control woman by some. During this decade, Caryn James paid tribute to Madonna's "honesty about using sexuality to gain control and power". However, for others like biographer J. Randy Taraborrelli she sounded only like a lusty porn star no one could take seriously. For example, Australian professor Graeme Turner said that Madonna can be seen as a figure who "exaggerates" (and therefore makes ridiculous) male expectations of female sexuality. In Grrrls (1996), Amy Raphael also criticized that "taking the concept further than any other female artist before her, Madonna sold herself almost exclusively in terms of her sexuality".

==== As an aged pop star ====
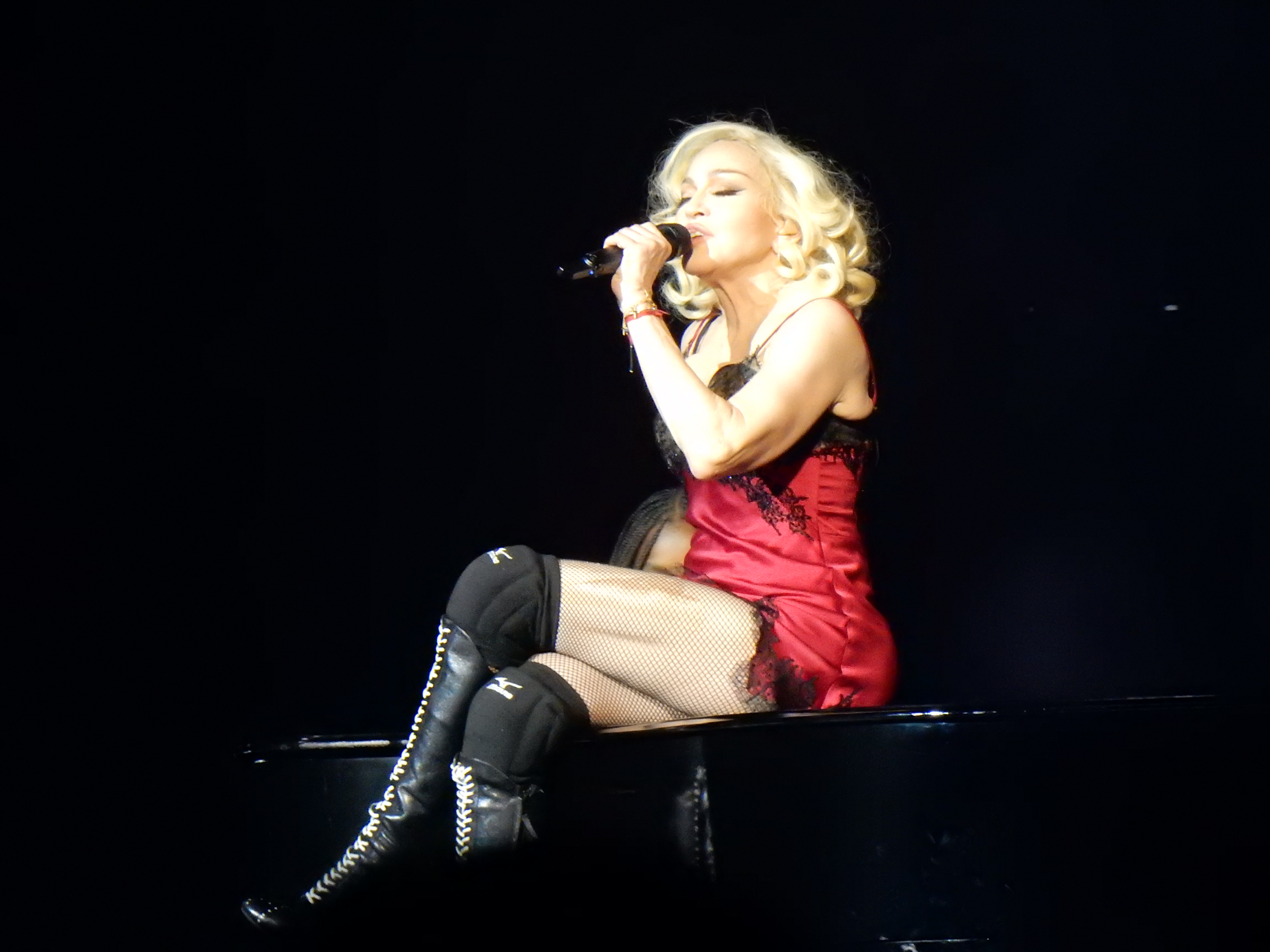
Madonna during the Celebration Tour in 2023

Madonna further polarized views audiences by using an open sexuality while aging, most notoriously when she entered into her 40s with a response by the public defining her as "desperate", "cringey" and "give it up", according to Grazia magazine. Scholar Deborah Jermyn argues that Madonna for new audiences and her experimentation with sexuality, suggests and has come to mean "nothing" as it is gaining online critics by the thousands. Authors in Ageing Women in Literature and Visual Culture (2017) see Madonna overt sexuality to being demonized. Writing for PinkNews in 2023, Marcus Wratten noted commentaries from British tabloid The Daily Mail, saying her "aggressive sexuality" is "threatening to compromise" her "uncompromisable legacy".

=== Other interpretations and Madonna's views ===
[...] artists like Linda Ronstadt and Madonna used their sexuality as a weapon to gain equal footing in the male-dominated rock world.

— 101 Albums That Changed Popular Music (Chris Smith, 2009).

Albeit Madonna herself was both challenge and radical figure, the criticism she faced has also been subject to interpretation by other popular culture commentators. For instance, some reviewers felt a double standard in her industry. Gauntlett compared the sexuality deployment between male and female artists, comparing artists such as Elvis Presley and Mick Jagger while explained they were called "sex gods" due their sexual display and appeal. But, in the context of Madonna and women, scholar further adds this role was "unexpected" and "challenging". In 1993, scholar E. Ann Kaplan compared how male pop stars from Presley to Michael Jackson and Prince "have gotten away exploring male sexuality", but a female icon like Madonna "creates disturbance". In Madonnaland (2016), Alina Simone wrote that the sexual double standard becomes clear, when compare Madonna to "famously libidinous" artists like Jim Morrison or Jagger. In 2016, Emily Ratajkowski uses Madonna and Jagger to compare sexism in the industry, because she receives commentaries such as "desperate" or "a hot mess", and both are performers perceived to have a similar artistic sexuality brands. She asked: "So why does Madonna get flak for it while Jagger is celebrated?". However, related to comparison of sexism, Melanie Sjoberg from Australian outlet Green Left labeled an almost identical question as "the obvious feminist question". In Pop Cult: Religion and Popular Music (2010), author Rupert Till compared androgynous and overtly sexual artists such as Michael Jackson and Prince with Madonna describing her as the most who significantly addressed sex and caused more sexual controversy than any other musical act. On the other hand, at the 2021 International Conference on Human Aspects of Information, participants deemed as a "misogynistic rhetoric" the way ridiculing "her sexual agency and humiliating it" by using comparison with younger artists as a way to shame Madonna.

In her career, Madonna herself made some responses. On this, Constantine Chatzipapatheodoridis, a Greek adjunct lecturer at University of Patras, wrote that her "responses vary when openly provokes the public with overt sexuality". She addressed criticisms of setting women back 30 years in a 1984 interview with MTV, saying "I don't think that I'm using sex to sell myself, I think that I'm a very sexual persona and that comes through in my performing, and if that's what gets people to buy my records, then that's fine. But I don't think of it consciously, 'Well, I'm going to be sexy to get people interested in me' It's the way I am, the way I've always been". During the Billboard Women of the Year of 2016, Madonna expressed: "I made my Erotica album and my Sex book was released. I remember being the headline of every newspaper and magazine. Everything I read about myself was damning. I was called a whore and a witch. One headline compared me to Satan. I said, 'Wait a minute, isn't Prince running around with fishnets and high heels and lipstick with his butt hanging out?' Yes, he was. But he was a man". Lilly J. Goren believes that Madonna "correctly argued" that it is a double standard to criticize her for using sexuality to gain power but not to criticize Presley or Jagger for employing the same tactics.

== Impact on popular culture ==
Madonna’s sexuality and its impact have been further examined from differing perspectives.

=== Discussions and attributed impacts ===
Madonna set the trend for promoting a highly sexualized form of femininity, that was challenging, and transformed popular culture.

— Scholars Berrin Yanıkkaya and Angelique Nairn (2020).

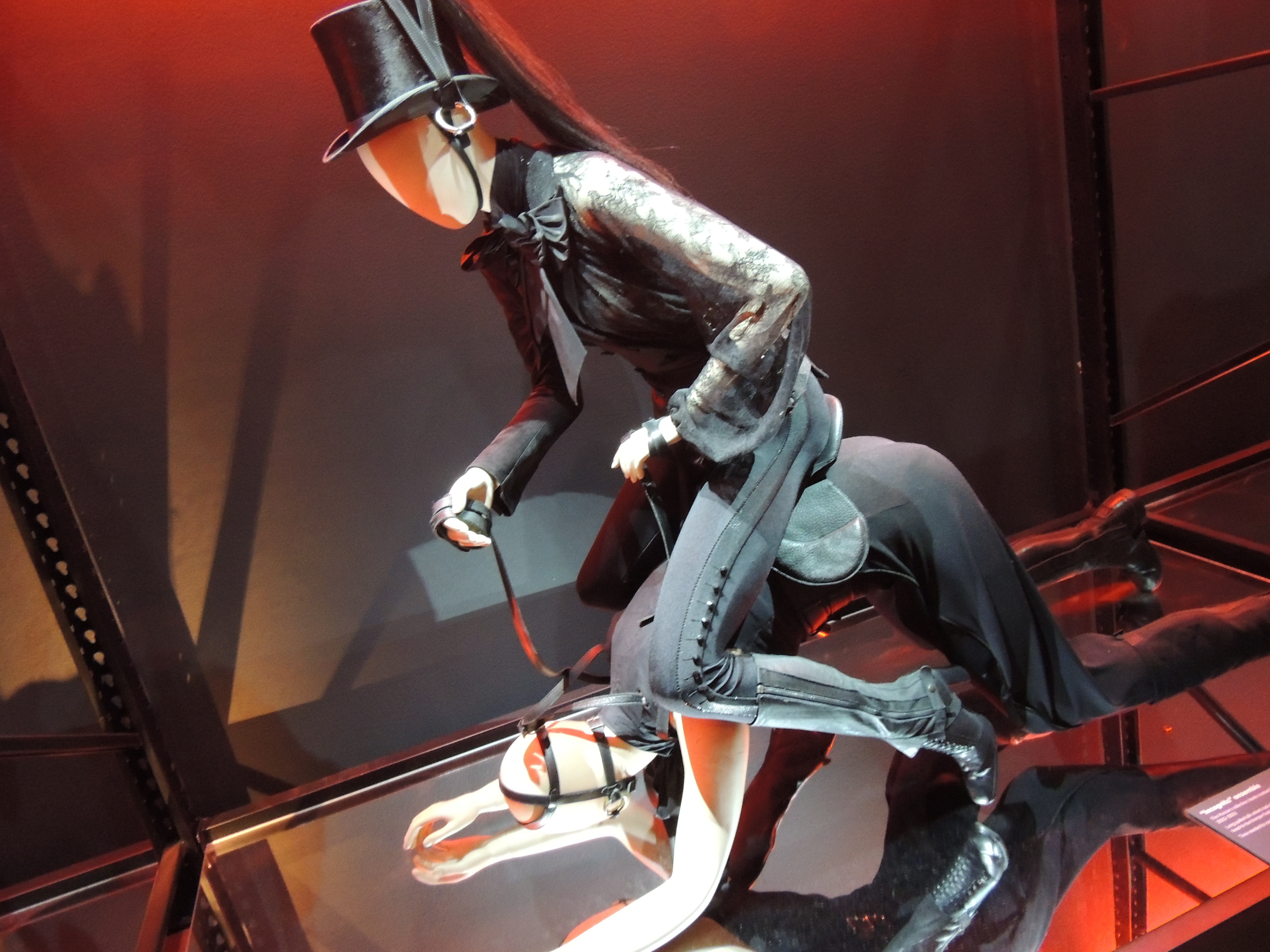
A representation of Madonna subduing a man. It's channeling her outfit during the Confessions Tour in the equestrian segment.

In 2000, British magazine New Statesman said that Madonna "irrevocably changed the media image of female sexuality".

Some scholars credit Madonna with bringing issues into the mainstream. Researcher Brian Longhurst from University of Salford summarized this view, stating, "it is argued that her videos and books, bring forms of sexual representation, which had been hidden, into the mainstream". Scholar Brian McNair similarly suggested that Madonna's figure announced the arrival of a new phase in Western sexual culture. In The Twentieth Century in 100 Moments (2016), authors observed many examples and how today celebrities are open in ways "unimaginable a hundred years ago", and referring on Madonna: "Perhaps more than anyone else, [she] swayed American culture in that direction at the tail end of the twentieth century".

Some commentators similarly discussed Madonna's role in bringing new connotations of sexuality in mainstream culture, and was described as a "trailblazer" in this regard. Semiotician Marcel Danesi argued Madonna introduced a new form of feminism, liberating women to express their sexuality on "their own terms". Professor Patrice Oppliger has made a similar observation. In Queer in the Choir Room (2014), Michelle Parke goes further saying "Madonna single-handedly accelerated the battle between opposing ideas of appropriate expression of female sexuality". Likewise, in his view British journalist Matt Cain argued she brought female sexuality "front and centre". In Gauntlett's view, she did not invent sexiness in pop, but she could be credited with bringing a female desiring gaze to centre stage. The staff of The New Zealand Herald regards Madonna as a "pioneer" of intelligent sex appeal. Editors of Controversial Images (2012), credited that "the unprecedented visibility of sexuality" which Madonna embraced, has also contributed to the creation of the pop music diva—a powerful female music performer who explores sexuality openly and purposefully. E. San Juan Jr. commented "she is credited too with the exercise of 'gender-free sex', blurring the male/female boundaries by flirting with bisexuality, multiple partners and cross-dressing" among other things. In 2012, Sara Marcus devoted an article in Salon as "a celebration of the way she changed sexual mores".

Madonna promoted the costume and practices of prostitution as a model for girls and women and contributed to the cultural normalisation of prostitution.

— Professor Sheila Jeffreys.

Conversely, other scholars and commentators have dismissed claims of Madonna's positive influence or have assigned her a more negative cultural role. In her book Sex Symbols (1999), Donna Leigh-Kile described that Madonna "has pushed the boundaries that most women do not wish to broach". In The Happy Stripper (2007), the author reports that feminist critics have described Madonna as degrading to womanhood, characterizing her as "vulgar, sacrilegious, stupid, shallow [and] opportunistic". Professor Sheila Jeffreys argues that Madonna contributed to the cultural normalization of prostitution, citing a spokesperson of a pro-prostitution organization called Network of Sex Work Projects whom was favorable to Madonna's impact for her industry. In Cultural Studies: Theory and Practice (2011), Chris Barker identified Madonna as a significant point of reference of the raunch culture. According to Hypebot, Cher and Madonna were the mothers of pop-porn chic. In the early 1990s, bell hooks criticized Madonna from a racial perspective, saying that many black women who are disgusted by her flaunting of sexual experience are enraged due Madonna is "able to project and affirm with material gain has been the stick the society has used to justify its continued beating and assault on the black female body".

=== Entertainment industry ===
Many young women have followed in her path, including Ms. Aguilera and Pink. And by making overt sexuality part of her act, she even paved the way for hip-hop artists like Lil' Kim, who made waves by going nearly topless to the MTV awards.

— Lynette Holloway from The New York Times (2003).

Madonna's sexual impact has also been discussed within the entertainment and music industries, particularly among female artists. Scholar Arthur Asa Berger argued her usage of sexuality has been imitated by other females.

In The Virgin in Art (2018), art historian Kyra Belán wrote that Madonna has opened the doors for other women artists as she established a "new frontier" for female sexuality. Professor Robert Sickels, similarly wrote that her sexuality was "vastly influential in paving the way" for not only the sexual expression of future female musicians, but also the acceptance of different forms of sexuality of countless of artists. Sociologist David Gauntlett was also of the idea that future female artists after Madonna, had the accessibility to express their own sexuality, largely thanks to her. The Advocate magazine made a similar commentary in 2012. Sergio del Amo, editor of Spaniard newspaper El País, however commented in 2017 that Madonna paved the way for various artists in terms of sexuality, though they did not receive the same criticisms of hers. Madonna herself, supported Miley Cyrus against criticism for her highly sexualised image in the mid-2010s.

The music industry exploited Madonna's concept of using sexuality to gain power by ensuring that other female performers were perceived as sexual objects as a means of selling albums during the 1980s, 1990s, and 2000s.

— Historian Lilly J. Goren (2009).

Historian Lilly J. Goren was inclined to conclude that Madonna perpetuated the public perception of women performers as feminine and sexual objects, and it has an effect for women musicians who wanted to be taken seriously by the public, due to the "damaging" Madonna's usage of her sexuality. In 2004, Shmuley Boteach widely criticized her by saying that she was allowed to "destroy" the female recording industry by erasing the line that separates music from pornography. As before Madonna, it was possible for women more famous for their voices than their cleavage. Boteach further adds, that in the post-Madonna universe, artists feel the pressure to expose their bodies in order to sell albums. Feminist scholars Cheris Kramarae and Dale Spender explained "Madonna may have preached control, but she created an illusion of sexual availability that many female pop artists felt compelled to emulate". However, Goren also explored how others took benefit of Madonna's sexuality, finding that she "challenged how sexuality and sex should be portrayed on MTV", later arguing: "With the popularity of Madonna and through the medium of MTV, the music industry worked to produce solo acts such as Debbie Gibson, Pebbles, and Tiffany. The use of the media to market sexuality and thereby sell records has only increased in recent decades". On the other hand, others like the author of Someone like-- Adele (2012) whom describes the "trail blazed by Madonna", explained that some artists did not followed it and proposes a "turning point" in consumer music culture contextualizing the case of Adele. By this time, authors of Future Texts (2012), also explained that some millennial pop divas such as Britney Spears or Lady Gaga, used sexuality but without "any of the subversive elements that made Madonna's work the subject of feminist inquiry".

By early 2020s, Madonna faced criticisms from some online communities, including Black community, regarding her self-attribution influence of sexuality, particularly in relation to female rappers such as Cardi B. Tony Hicks, a music critic from Riff magazine, joined the conversation though his view was largely favorable toward Madonna. Alaina Demopoulos, an editor from The Guardian noted the criticisms of her self-credit role in the "Pornification of Pop", saying Madonna "would like to remind us all that she invented sex". In an op-ed article for NBC News, Ohio State University professor Treva B. Lindsey, didn't give her "too much" credit in the sex-positive freedom. Instead, she remarked the influence of Blues singers of the mid-20th century, who says were more influential than Madonna for opening the doors of female rappers (such as Lil' Kim, Mary J. Blige or Missy Elliott ) in terms of sexuality. In 2019, Australian magazine The Music commented "Madonna's corporeal feminism impacted on female rappers" such as Cardi B or Lil' Kim among many others female rappers.

Some figures from music industry, including Joni Mitchell have criticized Madonna, as Joe Taysom from Far Out nothing prior to her, "it wasn't a particularly popular route of expressions for female musicians at the time". While not attributing this shift solely to Madonna, American singer Sheryl Crow gave her a more serious role over others, in damage the image of women for using sex as a "form of power" in their "business form". Other artists referred to Madonna's impact, including Christina Aguilera, and Tove Lo who stated: "Madonna broke down barriers to allow female artists to express their sexuality. Madonna paved the way— she did all this hard work for us". In similar remarks, Louise Redknapp referred "without Madonna so many of us wouldn't have been doing what we were doing". Madonna made a response in the criticisms that women in pop are sexually exploited, stating, "we are exploring our sexuality". More critical were the views of Steve Allen and Morrissey, both of whom compared Madonna and her sexuality to prostitution or to a prostitute; Morrissey added "I mean the music industry is obviously prostitution anyway".

== Depictions ==
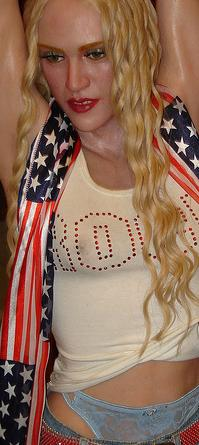
A Mexican Madonna wax figure, depicted with a provocative style. Some considered her the "Poster Girl" for "sexy", according to Grazia.

In the early 2000s, Guilbert brought the example of producers and distributors having used her image to serve their interests, mentioning the case of Columbia Pictures when they gave away with magazine Hollywood Avenue an audio cassette that helped to promote A League of Their Own, saying that the tape sold sex and exploited Madonna's sexual image as well.

Inspired in Madonna, Netherlands-based company VDM International started to sell condoms in the late 1990s, throughout Europe and Japan, receiving a "high demand". Named the "Madonna Condoms", it featured the singer's face on the boxes and internal package, taken from her nude photos shoot by Martin Schreiber in 1979 whom sold them the license. The US rights were bought by CondoMania, a Hollywood-based company. Its president and founder Adam Glickman, stated that "he's using the 'Madonna Condom' to help educate people about safe sex". According to Los Angeles Times, CondoMania began selling the condoms on August 25, 2001, and sold more than 1,000 boxes in its first three days. During 2004 and 2005, thousands of Madonna Condoms were donated to organizations such as The Douglas County AIDS Project, Los Angeles Gay and Lesbian Center and New York's Gay Men's Health Crisis.

=== Listicles and superlatives ===
In addition to be called a sexual icon or sex symbol, in her first decades of career, Madonna was characterized in various ways in both press and academic publications in relation to her sexuality. In Girl Heroes (2002), Susan Hopkins called her "Queen of Sexual Politics". Esquire named her the "Sex Queen of America" in 1994. Others similarly called her a "Sex Queen" and a "Porn Queen". In late 1990s, Boze Hadleigh felt and expressed she "become a sex goddess for all generations and genders". Madonna was suggested as an "icon of sex appeal" by art historian David Morgan. Madonna was long considered the "Poster Girl" for "sexy" according to Grazia magazine. In 1991, psychologist Joyce Brothers echoed: "Madonna is a sexy person for our time". Similarly, in Chris Moyles's book The Gospel According to Chris Moyles (2014), a young Madonna is cited as "one of the sexiest women on the planet". In 1987, Rolling Stone magazine crowned her as the sexiest female artist. Author Brian D'Amato called Madonna, Marilyn Monroe and the Mona Lisa, as the three sexiest women ever being with the letter "M".

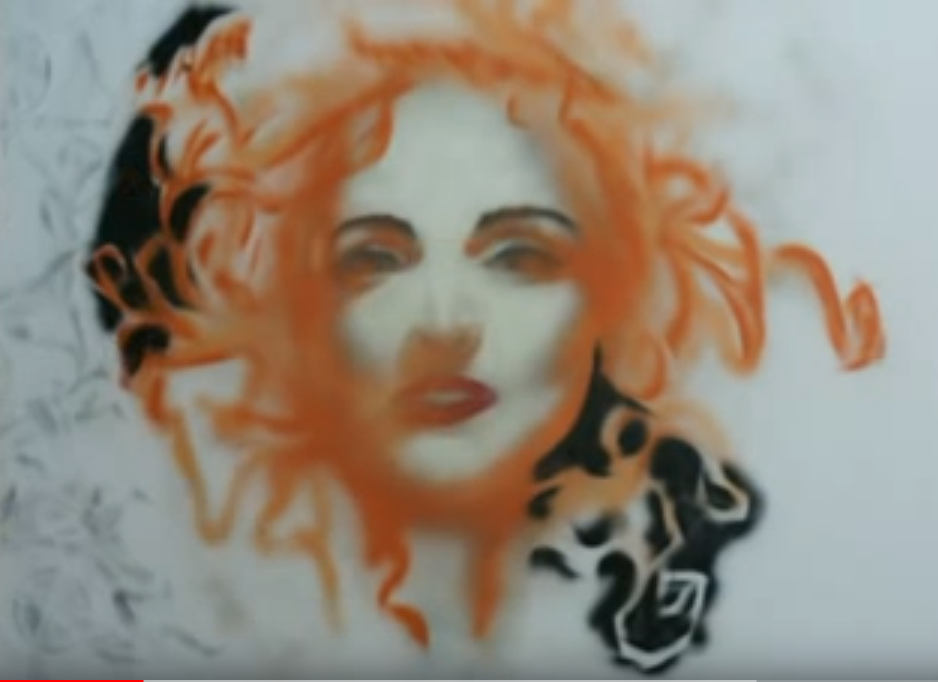
Madonna was also negatively called a succubus, Medusa or Whore of Babylon. In the image, Madonna depicted as Medusa.

In contrast, other publications have offered more negative characterizations of Madonna in relation to her sexuality. In Profiles of Female Genius (1994), the author described her as "the most arcane and sexually perverse female of the twentieth century". Critics such as Achille Bonito Oliva have noted that for some "Madonna restored the [image of] Whore of Babylon, the pagan goddess banned by the last book of the Bible". Other commentators similarly associated Madonna with the "Bimbo of Babylon", and other "mythical feminine monsters" such as the succubus.

In addition, Madonna is featured on related pop culture lists. She was voted as the World's Hottest Woman by readers of woman's magazine Cosmopolitan in 2000. VH1 similarly ranked her as the Greatest Sexiest Artist in 2002. She was included once again in their 2013 updated list, with the staff saying: "You can say many things about Madonna, but you can't ever say she's not sexy". In 2006, Madonna topped the rank of Toronto Sun's 50 Greatest Sex Symbols in history, as "acknowledgment of her extraordinary aptitude for using sex to provoke and promote". They also reported: "While others have been sexier, none has been more cunning in needling and nudging popular tastes to their own commercial again". In 2012, she was placed at number 9 in Complex list of the "100 Hottest Female Singers of All Time". In 2020, Men's Health included Madonna in their "100 Hottest Sex Symbols of All Time", with staff declaring: She "has captured the world's heads, hearts, and hormones with startling consistency".

== Censorship and controversies ==
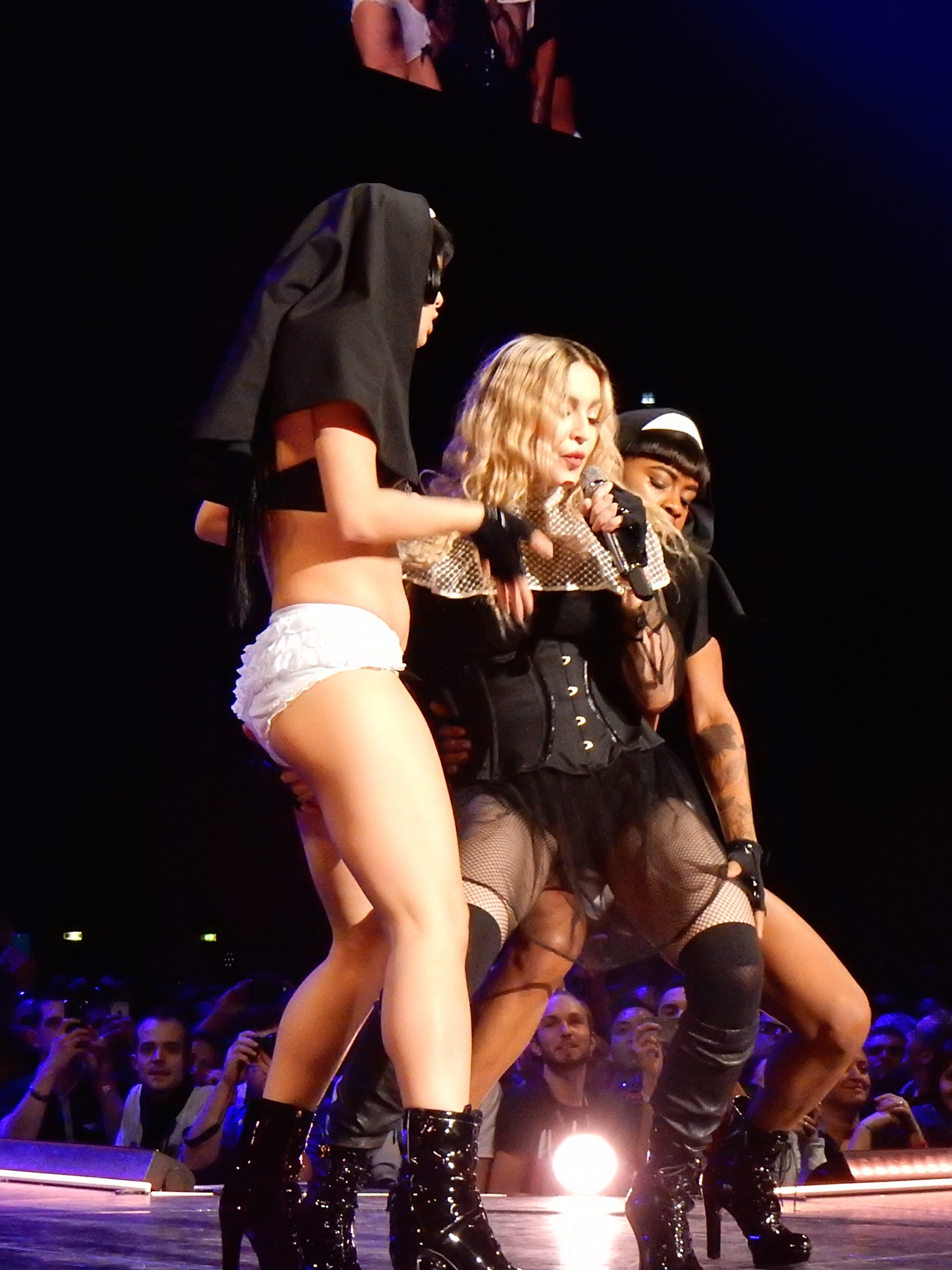
Madonna during her Rebel Heart Tour (2016), where showed pole dancing nuns and simulated sex shows. The concert was rated R18 by the Media Development Authority (MDA), which caused some songs to be removed from the set list in Singapore.

In Rethinking the Frankfurt School (2012), Madonna is described as "highly controversial" because of her exploitation of sexuality. She generated controversies and faced censure by her sexual-oriented performances, public addresses or demonstrations in her videos. Some notable censure, include by MTV during the release of the music video for "Justify My Love" in 1990. Media outlets like BBC also banned the song. An author noted she was perhaps the "main target" of concerns about sexuality by the Parents Music Resource Center (PMRC), citing Susan Baker, a founding member of the PMRC, complaining about Madonna "teaching" young girls "how to be porn queens in heat". In the book industry, sexologist Robert T. Francoeur noted how her first book Sex faced censorship in various locations as well. Artists like Donna Summer and Madonna were notably censured by Soviet Union for their sexual-oriented works. Madonna's performance at the 2006 Grammy Awards was censured in Malaysia. In May 2024, the Brazilian House Social Security and Family Committee approved a "motion of censure" for her free concert at Copacabana.

Madonna's popularity further worried others. For instance, a child pornography expert cited by UPI was concerned when magazines Playboy and Penthouse leaked nude photos of the singer in 1985. Writing for Harlan Daily Enterprise in 2003, Diana West also remarked her popularity and influence on other "pop descendants", saying the sexualization of childhood became "pretty irreversible" after Madonna, although it didn't start with her.

Within this root, authors of Popular Texts in English: New Perspectives (2001) interpreted her display of sexuality "politically subversive". Paglia stated she has used images of pornography and prostitution to provoke "strong reactions", including sectors of political, religious conservatives and feminists. A Christian author decries "she has sold literally tens of millions of records on the theme of pornography", while another Christian author expressed: "she has helped to plunge untold millions into sexually transmitted diseases, and the destruction of hell". Speaking about her visual works, in Performance and Popular Music (2007), Ian Inglish referred that she served as a "paradigmatic case of the sluttification of women in music video, rock music and popular culture". Scholars and authors of Cool (2015), agreed that "the contested nature of female sexuality was nowhere more polarizing than in the images created by Madonna". Similarly, in Pop Cult: Religion and Popular Music (2010), author Rupert Till wrote:

Madonna is perhaps the most extreme example of how sexuality that is considered taboo or outside of what is acceptable to mainstream in public, is deeply enmeshed within the fabric of popular music culture and cults.

== See also ==
- Sexuality in music videos
- Pornification
- Raunch culture
- Sex kitten

== Book sources ==
- Agrawal, Anuja (2006). Migrant Women and Work. SAGE. ISBN 076193457X.
- Allen, Steve (1996). But Seriously--: Steve Allen Speaks His Mind. Prometheus Books. ISBN 1573920908.
- Attwood, Feona (2012). Controversial Images: Media Representations on the Edge. Palgrave Macmillan. ISBN 978-1137291998.
- Ballesteros González, Antonio (2001). Mora González, Lucía (ed.). Popular Texts in English: New Perspectives. University of Castilla–La Mancha. ISBN 8484271269.
- Barker, Chris (2011). Cultural Studies: Theory and Practice. SAGE. ISBN 978-1446260432.
- Bayles, Martha (1996). Hole in Our Soul: The Loss of Beauty and Meaning in American Popular Music. University of Chicago Press. ISBN 0226039595.
- Belán, Kyra (2018). The Virgin in Art. Parkstone International. ISBN 978-1683255925.
- Bell, Deborah (2015). Masquerade. McFarland & Company. ISBN 978-0786476466.
- Berger, Arthur Asa (2002). The Art of the Seductress. iUniverse. ISBN 0595230776.
- Boisvert, Donald L.; Johnson, Jay Emerson (2012). Queer Religion. ABC-CLIO. ISBN 978-0313353581.
- Bordo, Susan (2004). Unbearable Weight: Feminism, Western Culture, and the Body. University of California Press. ISBN 0520930711.
- Bret, David (2004). Morrissey: Scandal and Passion. Franz Steiner Verlag. ISBN 1861057873.
- Browne, Ray Broadus (1986). Browne, Glenn J. (ed.). Laws of Our Fathers: Popular Culture and the U.S. Constitution. The Popular Press. ISBN 0879723386.
- Brunsdon, Charlotte; Spigel, Lynn (2007). Feminist Television Criticism: A Reader. McGraw Hill Education. ISBN 978-0335225453.
- Cahill, Marie (1991). Madonna. Gallery Books. ISBN 0831757051.
- Callahan, Vicki; Kuhn, Virginia (2015). Future Texts: Subversive Performance and Feminist Bodies. Parlor Press LLC. ISBN 978-1602357709.
- Charles, Nicholas C. (2012). From Worldly to Christian Wisdom and Truth. Trafford Publishing. ISBN 978-1466906396.
- Chatzipapatheodoridis, Constantine (2021). The Music Diva Spectacle. Intellect Books. ISBN 978-1789384383.
- Cross, Mary (2007). Madonna: A Biography. Greenwood Publishing Group. ISBN 978-0-313-33811-3.
- Crowther, Hal (1995). Unarmed But Dangerous. Longstreet Press. ISBN 1563521938.
- D'Amato, Brian (2012). Beauty. Hachette UK. ISBN 978-0316217231.
- Danesi, Marcel (2010). Geeks, Goths, and Gangstas: Youth Culture and the Evolution of Modern Society. Canadian Scholars' Press. ISBN 978-1551303727.
- De Cecco, John Paul; Lukenbill, Grant (2013). Untold Millions: Secret Truths About Marketing to Gay and Lesbian Consumers. Taylor & Francis. ISBN 978-1317706014.
- E. San Juan Jr. (2002). Racism and Cultural Studies: Critiques of Multiculturalist Ideology and the Politics of Difference. Duke University Press. ISBN 0822383705.
- Faith, Karlene; Wasserlein, Frances (1997). Madonna, Bawdy & Soul. University of Toronto Press. ISBN 0-802-04208-2.
- Feminist Review Collective (1996). Contesting Feminist Orthodoxies. Psychology Press. ISBN 0415145635.
- Fouz-Hernández, Santiago; Jarman-Ivens, Freya (2004). Madonna's Drowned Worlds: New Approaches to her Cultural Transformations, 1983-2003. Routledge. ISBN 1351559540.
- Negrón-Muntaner, Frances (2004). Boricua Pop. NYU Press. ISBN 0814758789.
- Francoeur, Robert T. (1996). Taking Sides: Clashing views on controversial issues in human sexuality. Brown & Benchmark. ISBN 0697312925.
- Gao, Qin; Zhou, Jia (2021). Human Aspects of IT for the Aged Population. Technology Design and Acceptance. Springer Nature. ISBN 978-3030781088.
- Goren, Lilly J. (2009). You've Come A Long Way, Baby: Women, Politics, and Popular Culture. University Press of Kentucky. ISBN 978-0813173405.
- Govan, Chloé (2013). Christina Aguilera: Unbreakable. Omnibus Press. ISBN 978-0857129949.
- Gross, Alan G. (2018). The Scientific Sublime. Oxford University Press. ISBN 978-0190637774.
- Guilbert, Georges-Claude (2002). Madonna as Postmodern Myth. McFarland. ISBN 978-0-7864-1408-6.
- Guilbert, Georges-Claude (2015). Madonna as Postmodern Myth. McFarland. ISBN 978-0-786-48071-5.
- Hadleigh, Boze (1997). Sing Out!: Gays and Lesbians in the Music World. Barricade Books. ISBN 1569801169.
- Hamill, Pete (2009). Piecework: Writings on Men & Women, Fools and Heroes, Lost Cities, Vanished Calamities and How the Weather Was. Hachette. ISBN 978-0316082952.
- Henthorne, Tom (2011). William Gibson: A Literary Companion. McFarland. ISBN 978-0-786-48693-9.
- hooks, bell (2014). Black Looks: Race and Representation. Routledge. ISBN 978-1317588481.
- Hopkins, Dr. Susan (2002). Girl Heroes: The New Force in Popular Culture. Pluto Press. ISBN 1864031573.
- Inglis, Ian (2007). Performance and Popular Music. Ashgate Publishing. ISBN 978-0754681571.
- Jeffreys, Sheila (2015). Beauty and Misogyny: Harmful cultural practices in the West. Routledge. ISBN 9781848724471.
- Jeffries, Stuart (2021). Everything, All the Time, Everywhere: How We Became Postmodern. Verso Books. ISBN 978-1788738224.
- Jermyn, Deborah (2016). Female Celebrity and Ageing: Back in the Spotlight. Routledge. ISBN 978-1134924868.
- Jones, Derek (2001). Censorship: A World Encyclopedia. Taylor & Francis. ISBN 1136798641.
- Jones, Dylan (2013). The Eighties: One Day, One Decade. Random House. ISBN 978-1409052258.
- Klosterman, Chuck (2004). Sex, Drugs, and Cocoa Puffs. Simon and Schuster. ISBN 0-7432-3600-9.
- Kopkind, Andrew; Wypijewski, Joann (1996). The Thirty Years' Wars: Dispatches and Diversions of a Radical Journalist, 1965-1994. Verso Books. ISBN 1859840965.
- Kramarae, Cheris; Spender, Dale (2004). Routledge International Encyclopedia of Women: Global Women's Issues and Knowledge. Routledge. ISBN 1135963150.
- Landrum, Gene N. (1994). Profiles of Female Genius: Thirteen Creative Women who Changed the World. Prometheus Books. ISBN 0-87975-892-9.
- Leigh-Kile, Donna (1999). Sex Symbols. Random House. ISBN 1-883319-51-X.
- Lewis, Jeff (2002). Cultural Studies - The Basics. SAGE. ISBN 0761963251.
- Longhurst, Brian (2007). Popular Music and Society. Polity. ISBN 978-0745631622.
- Mansour, David (2005). From Abba to Zoom: A Pop Culture Encyclopedia of the Late 20th Century. Andrews McMeel Publishing. ISBN 0740751182.
- Martin, Nina (2007). Sexy Thrills: Undressing the Erotic Thriller. University of Illinois Press. ISBN 978-0252031953.
- Mattera, Jason (2012). Hollywood Hypocrites. Simon and Schuster. ISBN 978-1451625615.
- Menand, Louis (2003). American Studies. Farrar, Straus and Giroux. ISBN 0374706018.
- Merck, Mandy (2018). Perversions: Deviant Readings by Mandy Merck (Used 1993 and 2018 editions). Routledge. ISBN 978-1135200282.
- McGlynn, Cathy; O'Neill, Margaret; Schrage-Früh, Michaela (2017). Ageing Women in Literature and Visual Culture: Reflections, Refractions, Reimaginings. Springer. ISBN 978-3319636092.
- McNair, Brian (2002). Striptease Culture: Sex, Media and the Democratization of Desire. Psychology Press. ISBN 0415237335.
- Miller, Donald C. (2018). Coming of Age in Popular Culture. ABC-CLIO. ISBN 978-1440840616.
- Mills, Sara (1994). Gendering the Reader. Harvester Wheatsheaf. ISBN 0745011306.
- Morgan, David (2012). The Embodied Eye: Religious Visual Culture and the Social Life of Feeling. University of California Press. ISBN 978-0520272224.
- Moyles, Chris (2014). The Gospel According to Chris Moyles: The Story of a Man and His Mouth. Random House. ISBN 978-1473527522.
- Naremore, James; Brantlinger, Patrick (1991). Modernity and Mass Culture. Indiana University Press. ISBN 0253206278.
- Nealon, Jeffrey T.; Irr, Caren (2012). Rethinking the Frankfurt School: Alternative Legacies of Cultural Critique. SUNY Press. ISBN 978-0791488010.
- Oliva, Achille Bonito (1998). Disidentico: maschile, femminile e oltre (in Italian). Panepinto arte.
- Oppliger, Patrice A. (2015). Girls Gone Skank: The Sexualization of Girls in American Culture. McFarland. ISBN 978-0786486502.
- Paglia, Camille (2011). Vamps & Tramps: New Essays. Knopf Doubleday Publishing Group. ISBN 978-0307765567.
- Pringle, Rosemary (2020). Transitions: New Australian feminisms. Routledge. ISBN 978-1000248241.
- Oz, Avraham (1998). Strands Afar Remote: Israeli Perspectives on Shakespeare. University of Delaware Press. ISBN 0874135974.
- Parke, Michelle (2014). Queer in the Choir Room. McFarland & Company. ISBN 978-1476616957.
- Price, John (2003). AS Media Studies. Nelson Thornes. ISBN 0748768408.
- Quartz, Steven; Asp, Anette (2015). Cool. Farrar, Straus and Giroux. ISBN 978-1429944182.
- Raphael, Amy (1996). Grrrls. St. Martin's Press. ISBN 978-0-312-14109-7.
- Reinhardt, Akim; Rounds, Heather (2016). The Twentieth Century in 100 Moments: A Visual History. Voyageur Press. ISBN 978-0760347430.
- Rolling Stone Press (1997). Madonna, the Rolling stone files. Hyperion. ISBN 0786881542.
- Santana, Richard W.; Erickson, Gregory (2016). Religion and popular culture: rescripting the sacred. McFarland & Company. ISBN 978-1476663319.
- Sanderson, Caroline (2012). Someone like-- Adele. Omnibus Press. ISBN 978-1780383088.
- Sexton, Adam (1993). Desperately Seeking Madonna: in search of the meaning of the world's most famous woman. Dell Publishing. ISBN 0385306881.
- Schwichtenberg, Cathy (1993). The Madonna Connection. Westview Press. ISBN 0813313961.
- Shepley, Nick; Sanders, Vivienne; Clements, Peter; Bunce, Robin (2015). History+ for Edexcel A Level. Hachette. ISBN 978-1471837692.
- Shuker, Roy (2013). Understanding Popular Music. Routledge. ISBN 978-1134564798.
- Sickels, Robert C. (2013). 100 Entertainers Who Changed America: An Encyclopedia of Pop Culture Luminaries. ABC-CLIO. ISBN 978-1598848311.
- Simone, Alina (2016). Madonnaland. University of Texas Press. ISBN 978-0-292-75946-6.
- Smith, Chris (2009). 101 Albums That Changed Popular Music. Oxford University Press. ISBN 978-0-19-537371-4.
- Smith, Courtney E. (2011). Record Collecting for Girls: Unleashing Your Inner Music Nerd, One Album at a Time. Houghton Mifflin Harcourt. ISBN 978-0-547-50223-6.
- Spence, H. T. (2002). Confronting Contemporary Christian Music: A Plain Account of Its History, Philosophy, and Future. Foundations Bible College. ISBN 1882542401.
- Stange, Mary Zeiss; Oyster, Carol K.; Sloan, Jane E. (2011). Encyclopedia of Women in Today's World. Vol. 1. SAGE Publishing. ISBN 978-1-4129-7685-5.
- Steffen, Therese Frey (2002). Masculinities Mythos (in German and English). J.B. Metzler. ISBN 978-3476452931.
- Stevenson, Angus (2010). Oxford Dictionary of English. Oxford University Press. ISBN 978-0199571123.
- Stuart, Andrea (1996). Showgirls. Jonathan Cape. ISBN 0224036157.
- Taraborrelli, J. Randy (2002). Madonna: An Intimate Biography. Simon & Schuster. ISBN 0-743-22880-4.
- Till, Rupert (2010). Pop Cult: Religion and Popular Music. A&C Black. ISBN 978-0826432360.
- Turner, Graeme (2002). Film as Social Practice. Routledge. ISBN 1134607156.
- van der Plas, Els; Halasa, Malu; Willemsen, Marlous (2002). Creating Spaces of Freedom: Culture in Defiance. Saqi. ISBN 0863567363.
- Ward, Glenn (2011). Discover Postmodernism: Flash. Hachette UK. ISBN 978-1444141269.
- Willson, Jacki (2007). The Happy Stripper. I.B.Tauris. ISBN 978-0857736420.
- Whiteley, Sheila (2013). Too Much Too Young: Popular Music Age and Gender. Routledge. ISBN 978-1136502293.
- Yanıkkaya, Berrin; Nairn, Angelique Margarita (2020). Multidisciplinary Perspectives on Women, Voice, and Agency. IGI Global. ISBN 978-1799848301.
- Young, Jonathan (1996). Saga: Best New Writings on Mythology. White Cloud Press. ISBN 1883991137.
