= Casualties of War (disambiguation) =

Casualties of War is a 1989 drama film directed by Brian De Palma.

Casualties of War may also refer to:

- Casualties of War (album), a 2007 album by Boot Camp Clik
- Casualties of War (novel), a Doctor Who novel by Steve Emmerson
- "Casualties of War" (Foyle's War), a 2007 television episode
- "Casualties of War" (Highway Thru Hell), a 2015 television episode
- "Casualties of War" (song), a 1992 song by Eric B. & Rakim from Don't Sweat the Technique
- "Casualties of War", a 2012 song by Gossip from A Joyful Noise

== See also ==
- List of ongoing armed conflicts
- List of wars by death toll
- Category:War casualties by war

=== Related terms ===
- Casualty (person)
- Civilian casualties
- Collateral damage
- Conflict epidemiology
- Fragging
- Friendly fire
