= James Nares =

James Nares may refer to:

- James Nares (artist) (born 1953), British artist
- James Nares (composer) (1715–1783), English composer

== See also ==
- James Naremore, scholar of film and literature
