= Oppliger =

Oppliger is a surname. Notable people with the surname include:

- Emanuel Oppliger (born 1975), Australian snowboarder
- Patrice Oppliger (born 1963), American academic and cultural critic
- Paulo Oppliger (born 1971), Chilean alpine skier

== See also ==
- Oppligen
