= Jeff Lewis (professor) =

Jeff Lewis is an Australian academic who is professor of media and cultural studies at Royal Melbourne Institute of Technology (RMIT University), Melbourne, Australia. He is the author of numerous refereed articles and books which focus on cultural interface and conflict. His work on political violence and terrorism has been particularly important for government, community and media debate. Lewis is also a documentary-maker and musician.

Lewis's academic work has sought to re-politicise the concept of 'culture', re-building poststructural and psychoanalytic theory into a more distinctive zone of political critique. He argues, for example, that militant organisations like al-Qa'eda and ISIS (Islamic State of Iraq and the Levant) represent the failure of Enlightenment liberalism and the ideals of freedom. According to Lewis, it is simply inadequate to define these militant organisations as the ideological opposite to western democratic states.

Consequently, it is too simplistic to explain the war against ISIS in terms of familiar dichotomies—Islam/the West, tradition/modernity, theocracy/democracy, repression/freedom. Nor is it appropriate to explain the Islmaist militant attacks on the French satirical magazine, Charlie Hebdo, (2015) as an over-assertion of western freedom of speech rights, which showed little respect for Islam and western Muslims. While progressive journalists at the New York Times believed that western states need to reconcile speech freedom with respect for pluralism, Lewis (2015b) argues that speech freedom actually doesn't exist in the west. Speech and other freedoms are not equally distributed in western states, but are subject to the violent hierarchies around which these states are organised. Until we have equality of speech, Lewis contends, there can never be 'freedom of speech' or anything else.

Lewis has also famously argued that humans of the advanced world are the most violent beings of all times. Challenging people like Steven Pinker, Lewis claims that war epidemiology, mass species extinction and the amplified violence of social hierarchies are clear evidence of modern humans' violence. Citizens of the advanced world both consciously and subliminally transfer their displeasures to other human groups and species across the planet.

Lewis has made a major contribution to the field of Cultural Studies, particularly through the conceptualisation on 'transculturalism'. Lewis argues that culture represents an 'uneven' dispersion of stability and perpetual change. Whether by ecological necessity, conflict, revolution or slow integration and adaptation, social groups exist within the perpetual volition of change and hybridisation. Culture is always in a state of becoming.

Other Cultural Studies scholars have drawn similar conclusions, promoting a 'poststructural' conception of culture which surrenders political critique. However, Lewis (2005, 2008, 2012) insists that political critique is essential for Cultural Studies and the humanities more generally. Accordingly, while agreeing with Alain Badiou and other critics of the concept of human rights, Lewis has focused on the movable but insistent problem of social hierarchies and political violence. Lewis has deployed this 'cultural politics' critique for his various studies on political violence, disasters and development studies in Indonesia and other parts of the non-western world.

== Works ==
- Jeff Lewis, Extremity of the Skies, Flinders Publishing, Melbourne 2000 (reprint)
- Jeff Lewis, Language Wars: The Role of Media and Culture in Global Terror and Political Violence Pluto Books, London, 2005. Arabic translation 2010.
- Jeff Lewis (with Belinda Lewis), Bali's Silent Crisis, Rowman and Littlefield, Lanham MD, 2009.
- Jeff Lewis, Crisis in the Global Mediasphere: Desire, Displeasure and Cultural Transformation,. Palgrave, London, 2011.
- Jeff Lewis, Global Media Apocalypse, Palgrave Macmillan, London, 2013. Jeff Lewis, Health Communication, Palgrave Macmillan, 2015.http://www.rowmaninternational.com/books/media-culture-and-human-violence
- Jeff Lewis, 'Apocalyptic Erotica Now! The Allure of ISIS Online', 'The Conversation, March 2015a, https://theconversation.com/apocalyptic-erotica-now-the-allure-of-islamic-state-online-38782
- Jeff Lewis, Cultural Studies, Sage, London, 2002, 2008.
- Jeff Lewis (with Belinda Lewis), Health Communication: A Media and Cultural Studies Approach, Palgrave Macmillan, London, 2015.
- Jeff Lewis, Media, Culture and Human Violence: From Savage Lovers to Violent Complexity, Rowman and Littlefield, London, 2015b
