= Make Your Own Danger =

Studio album by Alina Simone
- Released: June 7, 2011
- Genre: Indie, Folk
- Length: 37:59
- Producer: Steve Revitte

Alina Simone chronology
Raw Demos (2011)	Make Your Own Danger (2011)

Make Your Own Danger is the fourth full-length album by singer-songwriter Alina Simone, released on June 7, 2011.

== Track listing ==
No.	Title	Length
1.	"Beautiful Machine"	3:41
2.	"Glitterati"	2:32
3.	"Gunshots"	4:03
4.	"Day Glow Avenue"	3:59
5.	"My Love Is a Mountain"	5:06
6.	"You Fade Away"	4:05
7.	"Just Here to Watch the Show"	2:33
8.	"In the House of Baba Yaga"	2:13
9.	"Make Your Own Danger"	4:04
10.	"Sun Kissed Slashes"	4:14
11.	"Apocalyptic Lullaby"	5:12
