= Sexuality in music videos =

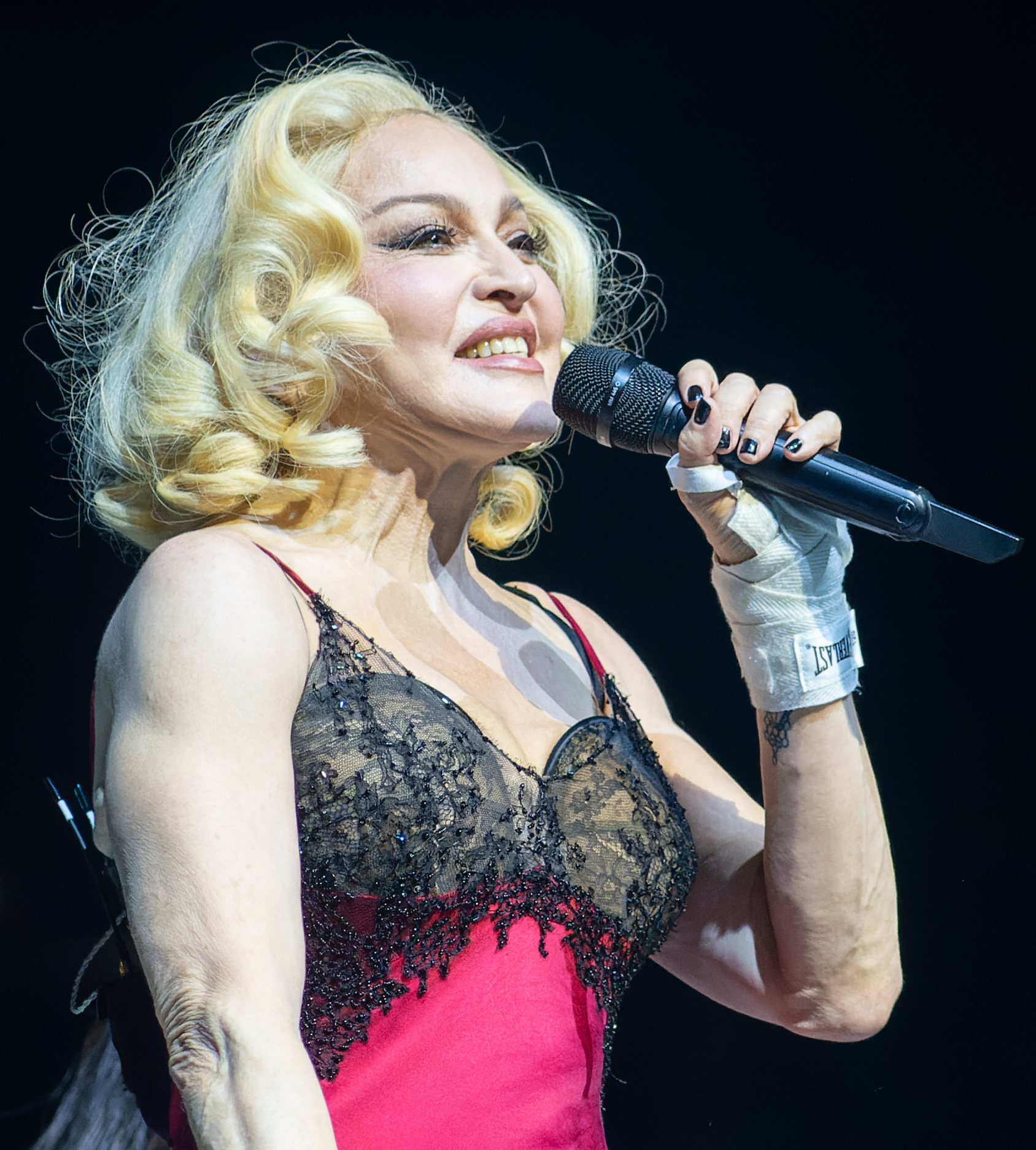
Madonna, a notable example in using sexuality in videos and live performances, who attracted significant critical analysis and criticisms

Sexuality in music videos has been evident since the 1980s. Sexuality refers to how people experience and express themselves as sexual beings. Music videos have been an integral part of popular culture and media consumption. From the early days of music on television in the 1980s, to the rise of social media in the 2010s to the present, music videos have used methods (dance, fashion, imagery, etc.) to explore sexuality. Scholars have examined sexuality in music videos, identifying a tension between objectification and reclamation of sexuality that reflects both exploitation and empowerment, particularly of women and Black individuals.

== Before 1980 ==
The potential for film and music working together has been exploited by Hollywood since 1927 with The Jazz Singer. For the way sexuality was portrayed in this early era of film see Pre-Code sex films.

== 1980s ==
On 1 August 1981, MTV, the first 24-hour music video channel, began broadcasting. The Rolling Stones, AC/DC, Michael Jackson, and Guns N' Roses were significant musicians featured on MTV.

In a 1992 study posted in the Journal of Broadcasting & Electronic Media, where characters' behaviors in 182 MTV music videos were observed, the authors argued that MTV promoted sexuality through video content and advertisements. The study concluded that in music videos, the male characters were portrayed as more dominant, professional, and aggressive, while female characters were submissive, performative, and emotional. A 1987 study that analyzed 30 hours of MTV content had similar arguments that music videos released in the 1980s typically depicted women as alluring objects. The results suggested: 57% of music videos displayed women being objectified, 17% accounted women's talents for the sexual roles they were highlighted, 14% did not align with typical stereotypes, and 12% acknowledged women's independence. In addition to these results, physical contact was displayed in over 50% of music videos, and women were often seen wearing seductive clothing. Young adults, one of the main audiences of MTV, were heavily affected by the prevalence of sexuality in music videos as it changed the way they viewed their roles in society.

The concept of sexuality in 80s music videos is evident in Olivia Newton-John's music video for "Physical." The video's cinematography emphasizes the naked male body. Another example includes Culture Club's music video "Karma Chameleon," in which the cameras are panned underneath women's skirts and zoomed in on cleavage. One scholar suggests that even the ways women are filmed in music videos can portray a narrow and sexualized view of them. An article by scholar Erika VaDyke refers to this idea as "isolation objectification", which occurs when the camera is focused on one body part of a person, specifically the stomach, genital areas, lips, and buttocks, reducing them to their body part as opposed to their whole being.

At the dawn of music videos, sexuality and gender stereotypes were already prevailing, with the younger generation being an important audience.

== 1990s ==
In the 1990s, as music genres transitioned into alternative and hip-hop, music videos continued to play a central role in pop culture. MTV continued to air music videos to the public, while influencing how people view themselves in society. As music videos grew in cultural prominence, researchers began to examine representations of femininity and masculinity in music videos. Simultaneously, MTV began to impose stricter standards on explicit content, claiming to censor videos containing nudity or violence.

For example, in the 1990s, MTV rejected Madonna's "Justify My Love" video due to its explicit content. Still, some argued female artists like Madonna, who chose to present her sexuality in music videos flauntingly, were impressive and ground-breaking.

Despite people’s growing attention to sexuality in music videos, studies show that such videos often reinforced gender stereotypes and impacted youth’s self-perceptions. For example, the study Sexual Objectification in Music Videos: A Content Analysis Comparing Gender and Genre, analyzed the centrality and depiction of women in the 100 most popular videos of the decade, revealing that the most popular music videos on MTV underrepresented women and portrayed them in a manner that emphasized their physical appearance rather than musical ability. This study first sorted men and women into the categories of leading or supporting figures in music videos, revealing that men outnumbered women in lead roles by a five-to-one margin. Secondly, the study categorized the lead roles into seven main portrayals: artist, poser, comic, actress, superhuman, dancer, or crowd-pleaser. The analysis found that most women in lead roles were portrayed as either posers (35%) or dancers (29%), while men in lead roles were equally dispersed among the seven categories. Another study by Susan Alexander looked at 123 music videos from varying genres that aired in the summer of 1995; 44.7% of the videos failed to feature females in central roles, and 31.7% of the videos portrayed women as either objects or sensory props to romantic male desire. In another study, nonverbal sexual cues in music videos were also considered, with results showing that women could be depicted as more subliminally sexual than men. For example, in videos analyzed by this study, only 1.24% of men touched their hair compared to 38.35% of females. Additionally, only 26.80% of males danced suggestively in their videos, compared to 74% of females.

Although the genre of music changed in the 90s, sexuality in music videos remained predominant, with women often being sexualized more than their male counterparts.

== 2000s ==
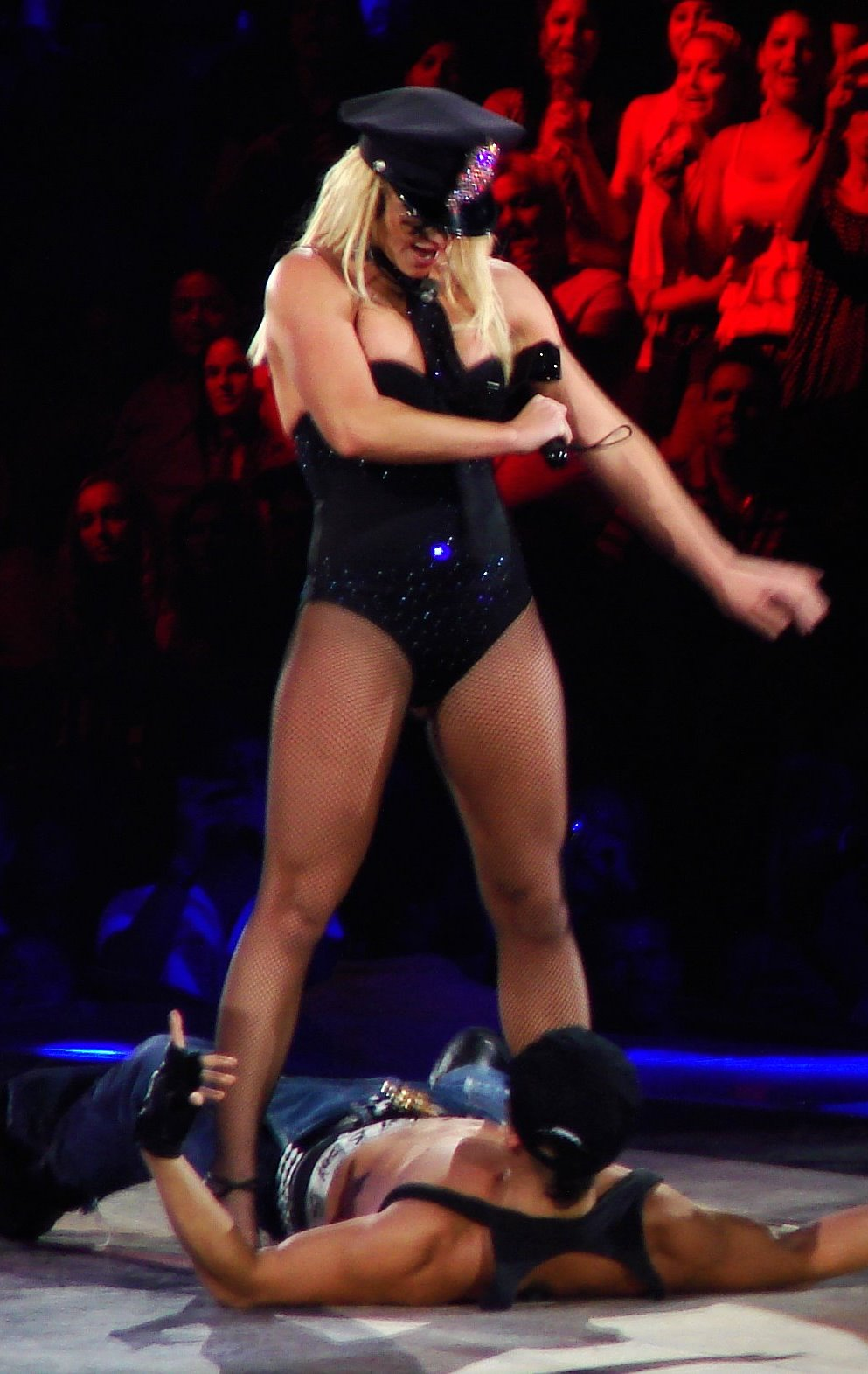
Singer Britney Spears performs in The Circus tour in Miami, 2009.

Music remained integral to cultural life in the 2000s, with only a few new genres, indie-related and electronic. Teen Pop had a heavy influence over the 1990s and into the first part of the decade. Artists like Britney Spears, Christina Aguilera, NSYNC and Backstreet Boys were extremely popular in the early 2000s. By the mid-2000s, Contemporary R&B had become the most popular genre with artists like Usher at the forefront.

A 2008 study by Industry Ears discovered that sexual content was increasing throughout music. In 2011, a study by Jacob Turner hypothesized that traditional African American music videos—hip-hop, rhythm and blues—would feature the most sexual content and more females dressed in provocative clothing. The study found that 73% of all music videos had some sort of sexual content. The study also found that 90.09% of mixed Hip-Hop and R&B music videos contained sexual content, followed by Hip-Hop with 79.7% and R&B with 76.9%. The genres that contained the least amount of sexual content on their music videos were Rock with 40% and Country with 37%.

The study also examined how African American and white background characters were dressed in music videos. It found that African American background characters were three times more likely to be dressed provocatively than white background characters. The study also concluded that while African Americans were proportionately represented in music videos, this representation tended to occur in videos with significantly more sexual content than videos that featured white background characters. In her article, Race, Body and Sexuality in Music Videos, scholar Erica VanDyke contextualizes these disparities by discussing the historical origins of racialized sexualization. VanDyke notes the historic perception of Black women as hyper sexual, animalistic beings in contrast to white women who were understood as non-sexual, pure and civilized. Referencing an example of early 2000s artists, Lil' Kim and Christina Aguilera, she argues that racialized perceptions continue to shape how women are represented in popular media, aligning with studies such as Jacob Turner's which find differences in how Black and white individuals are sexualized in music videos.

In 2004, many family groups and politicians lobbied unsuccessfully to ban Eric Prydz's "Call on Me" video for containing women dancing in a sexually suggestive way. In 2005, the music video of "These Boots Are Made for Walkin,'" which featured Jessica Simpson in character as Daisy Duke, was controversial for featuring Simpson in "revealing" outfits and washing the General Lee car in her bikini.

Sexual content in music videos extends beyond Western pop culture, and can be seen in studies of South Korean popular music. In an article, Cultural critic Chang Nam Kim attributes a rise in sexuality in South Korean music in the late 1990s to the end of the country's authoritarian political system, which encouraged more self-expression in its society. A study of MelOn's (South Korea's largest online music streaming platform) Hot100 music videos from 2004–2015 found a significant increase in women's sexuality over time, noting a rise in both revealing outfits and sexual behavior by female artists and girl groups such as Wonder Girls, 2NE1, and Girls' Generation.

The increasing sexualization of music videos reflects broader societal trends and continues to spark controversy over the portrayal of women and the influence this content has.

== 2010s ==
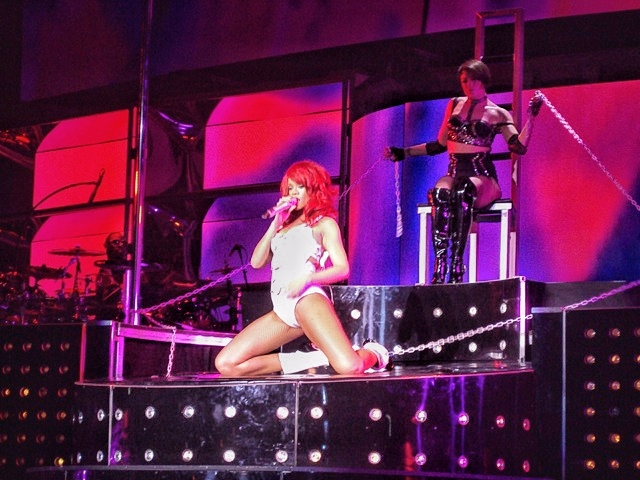
Pop star Rihanna (wearing white) performs "S&M" while chained during the Loud Tour in 2011. A woman dressed as a dominatrix (wearing black) is sitting in the background.

Into the 2010s, artists continued to create content with sexual themes and began to explore sexualities outside of heterosexuality. An example of this continuation of sexual content is in Rihanna's music video for the song "S&M," in which she simulates sex with a life-sized doll and wears bondage gear, which generated much media attention and was banned in 11 countries. YouTube required its users to verify they were 18 years of age before being able to view the video. The video's director, Melina Matsoukas, responded to the controversy by saying she felt it was a success because the provocative imagery created a dialogue around the video. Conversely, Ariana Grande's "Everyday" video, which depicts several couples beginning to have sex in various public places, such as on a bus, was praised for its sex positivity and inclusion of different races and sexual orientations. Sexual content in the 2010s has continued, but there have been varied responses to this content.

These varied responses have incited further research into the effects music videos that sexually objectify women have on women's body image perceptions. A study of college students found that young women with low self-esteem were more likely to view their body in a negative light after exposure to a sexually-objectifying music video. The same study found exposure to sexually objectifying music videos lessened the extremes of young women's concepts of an ideal body weight. A 2017 study found a relationship between sexual content in dance music videos and negative attitudes toward sex and sexuality among young adults in the United States and Australia. This shapes the conclusion that sexual content in music videos has a negative impact to self esteem and perception of sex.

Another angle to look at sexual content in music videos is within the realm of sexuality. Some scholars have noted sexualized content in music videos rarely depicts non-heterosexuality. Frederik Dhaenens has pointed out that when music videos feature gay content, it often involves a "heteronormative shaping of gay and lesbian identities," citing Macklemore and Ryan Lewis' "Same Love" as an example. Carly Rae Jepsen's music video "Call Me Maybe" demonstrates the heteronormativity in music videos. Its scenes portray stereotypical heterosexual figures who emphasize a heterosexual relationship. Music videos like Disclosure's "Latch" and Citizens!' "True Romance" emphasize homosexuality subtly. It is presented in small amounts to include sexual diversity and attraction. The artists' music videos depict heterosexuality but also include homosexuality to embrace social change. The 2010s music videos' included an increasing amount of non-heterosexual content. These various examples portray the various depictions of sexuality in music videos through the lens of sexual content. Overall, the 2010s experienced a continuation of sexual content in music videos, but also included new themes of sexuality and various debate over these concepts.

== 2020s ==
As technology continues to grow, more people have access to watch music videos through platforms such as TikTok, and the cinematography in music videos has become more advanced. Sexual content in music videos has also evolved. Many female artists are choosing to reclaim their agency in sexual relations and become bolder when expressing themselves in music videos. On the other hand, some artists continue to depict sexualization and imposition of violence on women in music videos. Additionally, in this decade, many artists are exploring beyond the gender binary and pushing boundaries with political and divisive content within their music videos.

== Role of social media platforms ==
Transitioning into the 21st century, social media platforms such as Facebook and MySpace grew in popularity. This allowed users to share music videos quickly with one another. This had an impact on the societal normalization of sexuality in music videos. Due to the increased accessibility of music videos online, there was an increased perception of normality with respect to sexual themes in music videos.

In particular, YouTube was a major contributor to this trend. The platform, launched in early 2005, grew rapidly—with its videos amassing one billion daily videos by October 2009, and became the largest video sharing site on the internet. Although YouTube's success in the 2000s was relatively limited compared to its explosive growth in the 2010s, it was nevertheless one of the most popular sites on the internet. Naturally, it became a hub for music videos as many content creators and fans flocked to the site to post content. Increased exposure to this sexual content has fabricated the idea of media sexualization. This media sexualization causes the user to increasingly self-objectify and hold a greater belief in sexism towards women.

YouTube continued to grow in the 2010s after a successful half-decade since its launch in the 2000s. Sexual themes were explored in videos that grew to enormous popularity on YouTube. Meghan Trainor's 2014 single "All About That Bass" is one example of this trend, although a milder one, as the sexual themes were very subtle. Nevertheless, the video amassed over 2.3 billion views on YouTube as of November 2019. Also in the 2010s came the rise of music streaming platforms such as Spotify, which reached 248 million active users by October 2019. The site is possibly creating a countermovement to the increased acceptance furthered by YouTube's growth by de-emphasizing the video itself in favor of the sound.

The rise of social media platforms like YouTube and Facebook contributed significantly to the normalization of sexual themes in music videos, as increased accessibility allowed for broader exposure.

== Depictions of race ==
Studies have shown music videos featuring African American characters tend to feature significantly more depictions of sexual acts than videos featuring white characters. For example, African American women are more likely to be depicted as engaging in sexual behaviors and wearing provocative clothing. A study in the American Journal of Health Education attributed music videos' "frank sexual messages, objectification, and overtly sexual images" to apathy toward these behaviors in African American girls. The journal considered this dangerous in light of the heightened HIV risk for African Americans. It has been suggested by scholar Jacob Turner that white-run corporations like Viacom (which owns MTV), are more willing to pay for music videos from African American artists who perpetuate racial and sexual stereotypes, thus explaining why African Americans videos are disproportionately sexualized compared to white videos. Implications include the idea that Black women may internalize video messages about beauty and sexuality, and that Black men and White individuals may form inaccurate and harmful ideas of Black femininity because of music videos.

Asian artists, like BoA, have been accused of presenting Western stereotypes of Asian female sexuality in their music videos, in an attempt to gain popularity in the United States. Japan's Koda Kumi and AKB48 also present sexuality in their music videos. Male K-pop star Rain's music video for his song "Rainism" has been credited with helping to refute stereotypes of Asian men as effeminate and weak, depicting an Asian man in various sexual situations, primarily with white women.

In the article "Sex and the Spectacles of Music Videos: An Examination of the Portrayal of Race and Sexuality in Music Videos," Jacob Turner studies the sexual behavior portrayed in music videos by two races. His study argued that African American women were more likely to portray sexual content than white women in music videos that were televised in the United States. This included both the use of provocative clothing and sexual acts in the videos, which ultimately showed how gender roles and race play a part in the amount of sexual content in music videos. In Erika VanDyke's article "Race, Body, and sexuality in music videos", she argues that men appear more often in music videos than women. Men are usually portrayed as "powerful" and "aggressive" characters. Consequently, women occupy stereotypically female roles in these music videos, and are usually seen as passive and are objectified in this manner.

== See also ==
- Sexualization and sexual exploitation in K-pop
- Censorship of music
- BDSM in culture and media
- Exploitation of women in mass media
- Misogyny in rap music
- Sexism in heavy metal music
- Sexual objectification
- Sexploitation film
