= David Gauntlett =

British sociologist

David Gauntlett (born 15 March 1971) is a British sociologist and media theorist, and the author of several books including Making is Connecting and Creativity. An early advocate of accessible online academic culture, and incorporating creative processes within research, Gauntlett's work has encompassed digital media, gender, identities, creativity, and music.

His earlier work concerned contemporary media audiences, with particular focus on gender and sexuality, and then moved towards a focus on the everyday making and sharing of digital media and social media and the role of these activities in self-identity and building creative cultures. More recently his work focuses on creativity, with a stronger emphasis on social justice, and the place of individual creative practice in a world of escalating technologies.

His research is a required part of the AS and A Level Media Studies syllabus in UK schools, and is often cited in the media sections of the Sociology syllabus.

== Career ==
Gauntlett graduated from the University of York in Sociology in 1992. He completed an MA in Women's Studies at Lancaster University in 1993. He took his PhD and then taught at the University of Leeds from 1993 to 2002, then was appointed Professor of Media and Audiences at Bournemouth University. In 2006 he joined the School of Media, Arts and Design at University of Westminster as Professor of Media and Communications, becoming co-director of the Communications and Media Research Institute (CAMRI), from 2010 to 2015. From 2015 to 2017 he was Professor of Creativity and Design, and the Director of Research for Westminster School of Media, Arts and Design.

Gauntlett's critique of media 'effects' studies sparked controversy in 1995, and since then he has published a number of books and research on the role of popular media in people's lives. In particular he has focused on the way in which digital media is changing the experience of media in general.

In 2007, he was shortlisted for the 'Young Academic Author of the Year' award in the Times Higher awards.

In the 2008 book, Reading Media Theory, Barlow & Mills state: "David Gauntlett is a prominent, public academic, who has spent his career engaging in research activities which have deliberately involved the public, and have crossed the traditional divide between the academic community and the outside world."

In 2018, he was invited to Canada to take up a role as a Tier I Canada Research Chair in the Faculty of Communication and Design at Toronto Metropolitan University, Toronto, where he founded the Creativity Everything lab, and ran projects including Reframing Creativity (2021-2024), and Creative Encounters (2025-2028) funded by Canada's Social Sciences and Humanities Research Council.

== New creative research methods ==
This approach asks participants to make something as part of the research process. Gauntlett's work of this kind began with Video Critical (1997), in which children were asked to make videos about the environment, and then in a number of projects which are discussed in Creative Explorations (2007). As well as studies in which participants have been invited to make video, diaries, collage, and drawings, Gauntlett has explored the use of Lego Serious Play as a tool in sociology and social research. This approach makes use of metaphor and invites participants to build metaphorical models of their identities. The process of making something, and then reflecting upon it, aims to give a more nuanced insight into participants' feelings or experiences.

This work has been supported by awards from the Arts and Humanities Research Council.

== Media Studies 2.0 ==
In 2007, Gauntlett published online the article Media Studies 2.0, which created discussion amongst media studies educators. The article argues that the traditional form of media studies teaching and research fails to recognise the changing media landscape in which the categories of 'audiences' and 'producers' blur together, and in which new research methods and approaches are needed. Andy Ruddock has written that Gauntlett's "ironic polemic" includes "much to value", and acknowledges that the argument "is more strategy than creed", but argues that audiences still exist, and experience mass media specifically as audience, and so it would be premature to dispose of the notion of 'audience' altogether.

== Making Is Connecting ==
In 2008 Gauntlett proposed 'the Make and Connect Agenda', an attempt to rethink audience studies in the context of media users as producers as well as consumers of media material. This argues that there is a shift from a 'sit-back-and-be-told culture' to a 'making-and-doing culture', and that harnessing creativity in both Web 2.0 and in other everyday creative activities will play a role in tackling environmental problems.

These ideas are developed further in his best-known book Making Is Connecting. The second edition of Making Is Connecting was published in 2018, and included additional sections on the creative process.

== Creative practice, practice-based research and music ==
Since the mid-2010s Gauntlett has been an advocate of practice-based research. In the online explainer 'What is Practice-Based Research?' he explains: "Practice-based research is work where, in order to explore their research question, the researcher needs to make things as part of the process. The research is exploratory and is embedded in a creative practice".

In 2026, Gauntlett published Fundamentals of Practice-Based Research and Research-Creation, a book introducing practice-based research, and outlining its basis, which is available open-access as a free PDF.

Gauntlett has explored approaches to practice-based research, and creativity, through music. His work as Sculpture Projects, released by Unfolding Records, has included the Restless EP (2022), Everybody should be able to be whoever they want to be EP (2024), and several singles.

== Books ==
- Fundamentals of Practice-Based Research and Research-Creation (Unfolding Records, 2026).
- Creativity: Seven keys to unlock your creative self (Polity, 2022).
- Making is Connecting: Second Expanded Edition (Polity, 2018).
- Making Media Studies: The Creativity Turn in Media and Communications Studies (Peter Lang, 2015).
- Making is Connecting: The social meaning of creativity, from DIY and knitting to YouTube and Web 2.0 (Polity, 2011).
- Media Studies 2.0, and Other Battles around the Future of Media Research (Kindle, 2011).
- Creative Explorations: New approaches to identities and audiences (London: Routledge, 2007).
- Media, Gender and Identity (Routledge, 2002; second edition, 2008).
- Web.Studies (edited collection, Arnold & Oxford Univ Press, 2000; second edition, co-edited with Ross Horsley, 2004).
- TV Living: Television, Culture and Everyday Life (Routledge, 1999). Written with Annette Hill.
- Video Critical: Children, The Environment and Media Power (John Libbey, 1997).
- Moving Experiences (John Libbey, 1995; second edition, 2005).
