= Lilly Goren =

American political scientist

- Education: Kenyon College; Boston College
- Scientific career
- Fields: Political science; Gender studies; American studies; Media studies; Comparative Politics; Political Theory
- Workplaces: Carroll University

Lilly J. Goren is an American political scientist and historian. She is a professor of political science and global studies at Carroll University, where she has also been Chair of the Department of History, Political Science and Religious Studies and Faculty President for the University. Goren uses popular culture, such as literature and film, to understand American politics. She has published work on how popular culture affects public perceptions of political leadership by women, how feminist ideas are reflected and affected by popular culture, and the politics of re-distribution in the United States Congress.

== Education ==
Goren attended Kenyon College, graduating in 1987 with an AB degree in Political Science and English. Goren then attended Boston College, where she earned an MA and then a PhD, both in political science.

== Career ==
In addition to her articles in peer-reviewed academic journals, Goren has been the author or editor of several books. In 2003, she published The Politics of Military Base Closings: Not in My District. The book uses the Base Realignment and Closing Commission to study the politics of re-distributive decisions by the United States Congress and the president, arguing that the Commission was a tool to shield representatives from the electoral consequences of redistribution.

Goren was the editor of the 2009 book You've Come a Long Way, Baby: Women, Politics, and Popular Culture, which studied the intersection of politics and popular culture from multiple different feminist positions. The core theme of the book is the study of how feminism informs popular culture, and how popular culture in turns affects understandings of feminism. The volume included close readings of television series, books, and films from both second-wave feminist and third-wave feminist writers. The authors and editor deliberately encouraged a critical dialogue between the chapters, arguing that the contrasting perspectives that the authors of the volume took regarding certain popular culture topics mirrored broader disagreements in contemporary American politics.

Goren was also the editor, together with Justin S. Vaughn, of the 2012 book Women and the White House: Gender, Popular Culture, and Presidential Politics. The book is a collection of works on how popular culture shapes public perceptions of leadership by women, as well as how these opinions are reflected in popular culture. It particularly focuses on gendered portrayals of, and gendered ideas about, the American Presidency. Women and the White House won the 2014 Susan Koppelman Award, which is awarded by the Popular Culture Association/American Culture Association for the best anthology, multi-authored, or edited book in the topic of feminist studies in popular and American culture that was published in the preceding year. It also received the 2014 Peter C. Collins book award from the Southwest Popular Culture/American Culture Association. Goren was also the co-editor with Linda Beail of Mad Men and Politics: Nostalgia and the Remaking of Modern America, published in 2015.

In 2022, Goren co-edited and contributed to The Politics of the Marvel Cinematic Universe, co-edited with Nicholas Carnes. A second volume is expected in 2025.

From 2010-2014 and 2022-2024, Goren was President of the Carroll University Faculty. She has also been a 2-time chair of the Politics, Literature and Film section of the American Political Science Association.

In 2018, Goren was a Fulbright Fellow at the University of Bonn. There she worked on a project called "Nostalgia in the Age of Anxiety: Political Culture, Emotion, and Citizenship".

Goren has been quoted, or her work has been cited, in media outlets including The Washington Post, USA Today, The Atlantic, WBUR, and WUWM, and she has published in outlets like The Washington Post and Fortune.

Since 2017, Goren is the co-host of the New Books in Political Science podcast published by the New Books Network. She interviews authors of new books in a long form interview. She arranges, conducts, and produces the podcast. She is also the co-host of the Postscript podcast published on the New Books Network.

== Selected works ==
- The Politics of Military Base Closings: Not in My District (2003)
- You've Come a Long Way, Baby: Women, Politics, and Popular Culture, editor (2009)
- Women and the White House: Gender, Popular Culture, and Presidential Politics, editor with Justin S. Vaughn (2012)
- Mad Men and Politics: Nostalgia and the Remaking of Modern America, editor with Linda Beail (2015)
- The Politics of the Marvel Cinematic Universe, co-edited with Nicholas Carnes (2022)

== Selected awards ==
- Susan Koppelman Award, Popular Culture Association/American Culture Association (2014)
- Peter C. Collins Award, Southwest Popular Culture/American Culture Association (2014)
