= Boze Hadleigh =

American journalist

- Born: May 15, 1954 (age 72); Syria
- Occupation: Author
- Writing career
- Language: English
- Genre: Non-fiction
- Subjects: LGBT, pop culture, show business

Boze Hadleigh (born May 15, 1954) is an author. Until the 1990s, he published some of his works under the pseudonym George Hadley-Garcia. Several of his books cover popular culture, show business, and LGBT culture. His 22 books have been translated into 14 languages.

== Writings ==
Several of his books deal with pop culture and/or entertainment history and how the media and status quo shape and manipulate audiences' perceptions and opinions. Some of his books are exclusively about the LGBT presence and contributions to entertainment.

Some of Hadleigh's books are quote collections, some are histories and overviews, and some are interviews with movie personalities. Several of these interviews, as with Rock Hudson, were published in periodicals before the subjects died.

== Life ==
Boze Hadleigh was born on May 15, 1954, in Syria. He holds a master's degree in journalism.

== Bibliography ==
- Hadleigh, Boze (1981). The Films of Jane Fonda. ISBN 080-650-7543.
- Hadleigh, Boze (1986). Conversations with My Elders. St. Martin's Press. ISBN 031-200-1150. (also published as Celluloid Gaze)

Conversations with My Elders (republished as Celluloid Gaze) includes interviews with actors Sal Mineo and Rock Hudson; directors George Cukor, Luchino Visconti, and Rainer Werner Fassbinder; and designer, photographer, and author Cecil Beaton. Their conversations with the author reveal much about the lives and careers of these celebrities and how their homosexuality affected both.

- Hadleigh, Boze (1990). Hispanic Hollywood. Carol Publishing. ISBN 080-651-1850.
- Hadleigh, Boze (1991). The Vinyl Closet:Gays and Lesbians in the Music World. Los Hombres Press. ISBN 096-234-9798. (also published as Sing Out!)
- Hadleigh, Boze (1992). Leading Ladies. Robson. ISBN 086-051-8086. (UK only)
- Hadleigh, Boze (1993). The Lavender Screen. Carol Publishing. ISBN 080-651-3411.
- Hadleigh, Boze (1994). Hollywood Babble On. Carol Pub. ISBN 155-972-2193.
- Hadleigh, Boze (1994). Hollywood Lesbians. Barricade Books. ISBN 156-980-0146.

Hollywood Lesbians is a collection of interviews with 10 lesbians in the entertainment industry. Publishers Weekly wrote: "Fans of Hollywood's golden age will find this collection of interviews conducted over many years revealing, though hampered. The subjects - director Dorothy Arzner, designer Edith Head, actresses Judith Anderson, Marjorie Main, Barbara Stanwyck, Nancy Kulp, Capucine, Patsy Kelly, Agnes Moorehead and Sandy Dennis — were raised in a generation terrified of voicing support for fellow homosexuals, let alone daring to come out of the closet to acknowledge their own sexuality... Still, with carefully couched questions from Hadleigh (Conversations with My Elders), though some of the respondents dance around the subjects of sex and sexuality. Still, an enlightening picture emerges of Tinseltown, different from that presented in the fanzines."

- Hadleigh, Boze (1996). Hollywood Gays. Barricade Books. ISBN 156-980-0839.

Hollywood Gays is a collection of interviews with prominent film personalities, such as Liberace, Anthony Perkins, Randolph Scott, and several others, most of them widely known as homosexual. Publishers Weekly said about the book: "Hadleigh (is) evidently taking up where the great gossip columnists of yesteryear left off." The book includes an interview with producer David Lewis, who talks freely about his longtime companion James Whale, as well as a conversation with William Haines, whose career was destroyed by Louis B. Mayer after Haines refused to marry a woman, and was later caught with another man in his cot at a YMCA.

- Hadleigh, Boze (1996). Bette Davis Speaks. Barricade Books. ISBN 156-980-0669.
- Hadleigh, Boze (1998). Hollywood and Whine. Carol Publ. ISBN 155-972-4730. (published in the UK as Hollywood Bitch)
- Hadleigh, Boze (1999). Celebrity Feuds!. Taylor Trade. ISBN 087-833-2448.
- Hadleigh, Boze (2000). In or Out. Barricade Books. ISBN 978-1569801567.
- Hadleigh, Boze (2003). Celebrity Lies!. Barricade Books. ISBN 156-980-2459.
- Hadleigh, Boze (2003). Holy Matrimony!. Andrews McMeel. ISBN 074-073-3257.
- Hadleigh, Boze (2005). Celebrity Diss and Tell. Andrews McMeel. ISBN 978-074-075-4739.
- Hadleigh, Boze (2007). Mexico's Most Wanted. Potomac Books. ISBN 978-159-797-1492.
- Hadleigh, Boze (2007). Broadway Babylon. Back Stage Books. ISBN 978-082-308-8300.
- Hadleigh, Boze (2014). An Actor Succeeds. Hal Leonard. ISBN 978-087-910-8885.
- Hadleigh, Boze (2015). Holy Cow!. Skyhorse Publishing. ISBN 978-163-220-5575.
- Hadleigh, Boze (2015). 492 Great Things About Being Italian. Skyhorse Publishing. ISBN 978-1634505345.
- In or Out: Gay & Straight Celebs Talk About Themselves & Each Other is a compilation of celebrity quotes from stars who comment on themselves, their sexuality, on others, on the closet, and on society's homophobia, as well as that of show business.
- The Lavender Screen: The Gay and Lesbian Films — Their Stars, Makers, Characters, and Critics is an illustrated overview of LGBT-themed films, most of them starring heterosexual actors in the lead gay, lesbian or bisexual roles, such as Robin Williams in The Birdcage. It was updated and re-released in 2001.
- The Vinyl Closet: Gays and Lesbians in the Music World focuses on present and past gay, lesbian and bisexual singers, composers, musicians and dancers in North America and Britain, with a foreword by Leonard Bernstein, and is one of the first books that document their artistic contributions. According to Madonna, it "cuts through the role-playing crap and shows the music world as it really ... is! It's camp with a High-C!"
