= Andy Ruddock =

Andy Ruddock is a media studies author and academic, currently based at Monash University, Australia. He has previously taught in the US, the United Kingdom, and New Zealand.

He has written two critical introductions in the field of audience studies, Understanding Audiences (2001) and Investigating Audiences (2007).

Ruddock has published on alcohol and anti-social behaviour, political celebrity, sport and racism and the mediation of foreign policy. Much of his work concentrates on overcoming the divisions between qualitative and quantitative research methods that is proliferate in media studies.
