= Alina Simone =

American musician and writer

Alina Simone (born Alina Vilenkin) is an American musician and writer. She is best known for her original songwriting, her album of cover songs by Russian punk poet Yanka Dyagileva, and her collection of autobiographical essays You Must Go And Win. She also blogs for The New York Times.

== Early life ==
Simone was born in Kharkiv, then part of the Soviet Union, now Ukraine. She came to the United States at a young age as the daughter of political refugees (her father, theoretical physicist Alexander Vilenkin was blacklisted for 'refusal to cooperate' after resisting recruitment into the KGB). She was raised in Massachusetts where she attended art school, focusing on photography.

== Career ==
After graduating, she moved to Austin, Texas where she began busking in doorways, performing her own songs. Her debut ep, Prettier in the Dark, was released in 2005, followed by an LP, Placelessness in 2007. Simone relocated to Brooklyn, and in 2008 released Everyone is Crying Out to Me, Beware, a collection of songs by the late Russian singer-songwriter, Yanka Dyagileva. This was followed by the dual 2011 releases of another collection of Simone's own songs, Make Your Own Danger, and her first book, You Must Go and Win. She is also the author of the novel Note to Self to be released in June 2013. In March 2016 she released the book Madonnaland, an essay piece about American singer Madonna and Simone's own analysis of music and pop culture.

=== Critical response ===
Simone's recordings reached a new level of prominence with Everyone is Crying Out to Me, Beware. Most response was positive. Spin magazine called it "a strange, hypnotic celebration of a defiant soul. (7/10)".

You Must Go And Win, Simone's first book, was likewise well received, with Kirkus Reviews calling it "vibrant, taut and humorous" and Publishers Weekly saying "Simone ably juggles the philosophical and the comical, her genuine enthusiasm for arcane subject matter as contagious as the fleas in her long ago apartment."

== Discography ==
- Prettier in the Dark (Fractured Discs, 2005)
- Placelessness (54º40' Or Fight!, 2007)
- Everyone Is Crying Out to Me, Beware (54º40' Or Fight!, 2008)
- Alina Simone / The Black Swans – Snowfall & Starlight / Country Cookie No. 3 (7", Ltd) (Sunken Treasure Records, 2009)
- Raw Demos (2002–2008) (Self-Released, 2011)
- Make Your Own Danger (Pentar Records, 2011)
