= Madonnaland =

Book by Alina Simone

- Book cover
- Editor: David Menconi
- Author: Alina Simone
- Cover artist: Lindsay Starr
- Language: English
- Series: American music
- Subject: Madonna; American music
- Genre: Essay
- Publisher: University of Texas Press
- Publication date: March 1, 2016
- Publication place: United States
- Media type: Paperback
- Pages: 138
- ISBN: 978-0-292-75946-6

Madonnaland: And Other Detours in Fame and Fandom is a non-fiction book written by American essayist and musician Alina Simone. It is a biography of American singer Madonna, as well the author's own analysis of music and pop culture. Upon its release on March 3, 2016 by University of Texas Press, Madonnaland received positive reviews from critics, who praised her writing and bold subject choice. Rolling Stone magazine listed it as one of the 10 Best Music Books released in 2016.

Consisting of six chapters, Madonnaland finds Simone visiting Madonna's birthplace, Bay City, Michigan, where she spoke with the local people about the singer. The book also analyses Madonna's career and fame, with the author delving into her own music career and obscure Bay City bands. Simone had been initially commissioned to write a new biography about the singer. However, due to already available excess content on her, the author felt she would not be able to find anything new. Instead, she ended up writing Madonnaland about her own failure to create a Madonna biography, why Bay City did not have any commemoration for the singer, as well as unknown music bands, pop culture and celebrity life.

== Content ==
The book is divided into six chapters: It begins with author Alina Simone walking around Bay City, Michigan and pondering why there was not a single commemoration to be found in the city about Madonna, who was born there. Simone's research began from that point and the essay continues analyzing Bay City and its culture. In the next chapter the author moves on to talk about 1980s music, Madonna's contribution and popularity after the release of albums, Like a Virgin (1984) and True Blue (1986). One of the questions reiterated by Simone is about the singer's legacy and what would happen to her wealth and fortune after her death, seeing that Madonna was not receiving the respect she deserved. With this in mind, Simone talks about how pop culture has moved from one fad to another, and her analysis of the musical landscape in Bay City. In the last chapter titled as Flying Wedge, the author reviews hard rock music and the punk rock bands of the city, and finally how relentless artists can be to produce music. She researches the one-hit wonder bands like Question Mark and the Mysterians—best known for "96 Tears"—and Flying Wedge, a Detroit band that released their record through Creem magazine in 1972 but disappeared. The author ends the book on a happy note that whether Madonna is remembered or not in her hometown, her musical outputs would never be forgotten. Final chapters are devoted to an epilogue about Simone's writing of the book and a thank-you section.

== Development ==
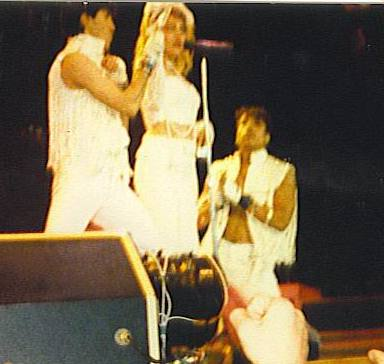
Madonna performing onstage during The Virgin Tour, 1985

When Simone was given the task to write a book about Madonna, she was enthusiastic about the opportunity, since she had admired the singer's musical output and her ambitious nature which has led to a successful career in show business. Simone recalled how Madonna had struggled through her early days in New York city, and through her tough business mind and musical intuition had succeeded in crafting her own niche.

However, she soon came to realize that writing a book about Madonna would not be as easy as she had thought. There was already abundant material available about her life and career and Simone could not find anything else left to be said in her book. The author hoped of "finding some tiny stone left unturned in the giant gravel pit of Madonna studies". She even had to return her book advance given by her publisher for failing to write the biography. Unable to produce a biography, Simone instead decided to pursue a different direction with the material. The author, who had already released the novel called Note to Self (2009) and is also a musician, wanted to focus on her own singing career, self-declared as a "failure". She confessed having a personal affinity for "underdog" musicians, an understanding which was totally opposite to what Madonna stood for with her success.

However, writing the book stopped the author from fully divulging into finishing her album and coming up with new music since she did not have the resources to promote like Madonna. Describing the thought as "depressing", Simone admitted that the process of writing "nearly drove her insane". Simone ventured into Madonna's birthplace, Bay City, Michigan where she interviewed different people and discovered the long-standing debate among its municipality about how to honor the singer, who never accrued any recognition from the mayor of Bay City. Simone documented these instances, while also reflecting on her own career as an Indie rock musician. Titled as Madonnaland: And Other Detours in Fame and Fandom, the book was released on March 1, 2016 by University of Texas Press in the United States.

== Critical reception ==
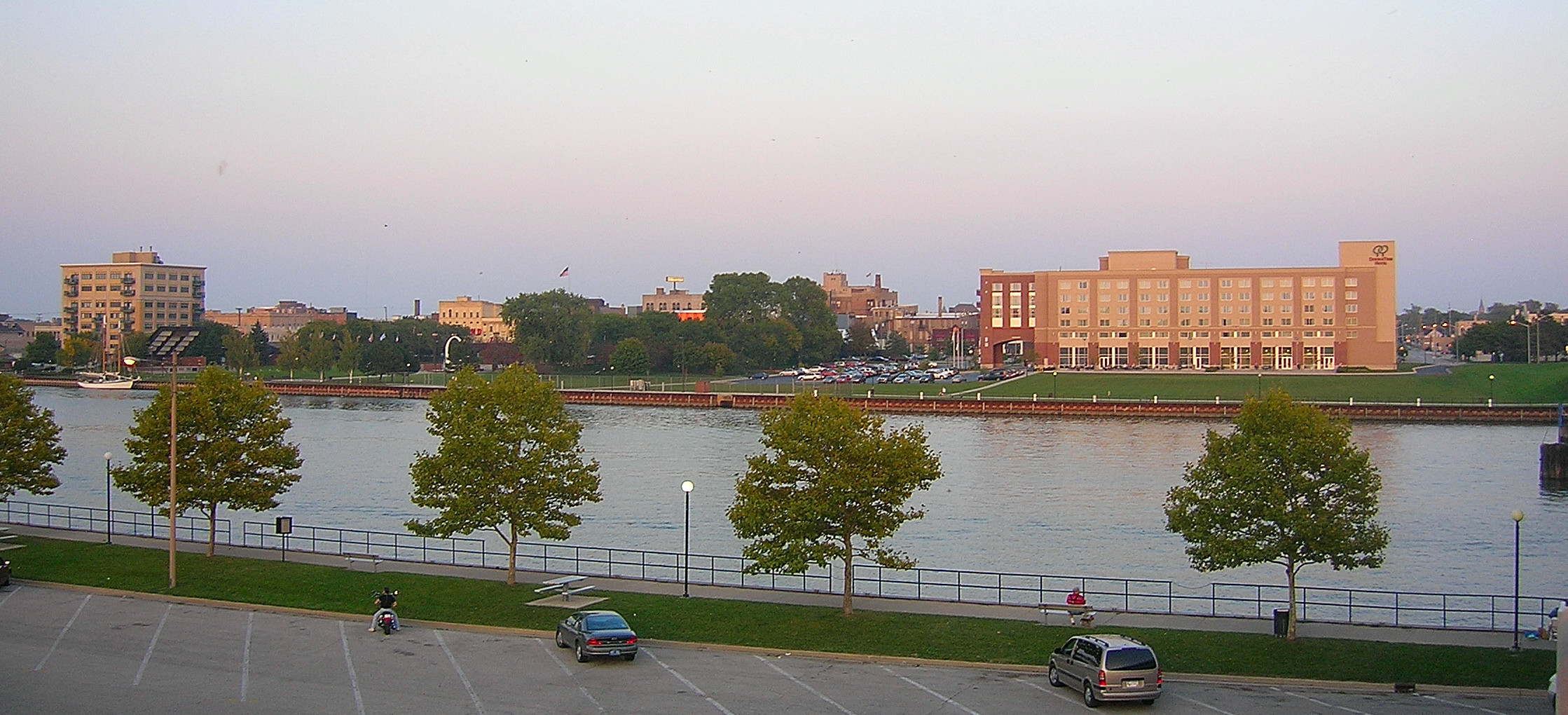
Bay City, Michigan, the main backdrop of the book, and Madonna's birthplace.

After its release, the book received mostly positive reviews. It was listed by Rolling Stone as one of the 10 Best Music Books in 2016. Jason Diamond from the publication reviewed it and found that the book gave a "fuller, weirder and more interesting overview of Madonna" than was already present in previous works about her. He complimented the author's "riveting" way of presenting the past figures from Bay City associated with the singer as well as Simone's own transition into indie music. Jennifer Levin from The Santa Fe New Mexican commended Simone's "wit and grace" in reporting Bay City's troubled relationship with Madonna, including the political agenda surrounding her. She noted that the story found its footing at the point in the book where the author wrote about Flying Wedge (in the last chapter). Writing for PopMatters, Megan Volpert rated the book 7 out of 10 stars, and described it as "excellent", suggesting it as an important addition to modern cultural criticism. She commended Simone's writing and her courage to pick up an unusual subject for the book. Volpert commented, "Does the world need one more half-baked biographical update on Madonna? No, it does not. What the world does need is Simone's productively clear-eyed assessment of her own musical and journalistic failures, [...] for the detours unavoidably provoked by fame and fandom," concluded the review.

Dmitry Samarov from Chicago Reader found contrast in the author's description of Madonna's rising popularity and her own indie rock music career. To him, the most interesting portion was when Simone realized in the book that the singer's output was simply enjoyed by people because "it makes them happy". Samarov, who professed that he did not have much interest in Madonna's career, was glad that Madonnaland was written about one's "success and failure". The National Public Radio network of the United States listed Madonnaland as one of their Best Books of 2016. Critic Michael Schaub analyzed the subject and felt that Simone's humorous method of writing was also "a perceptive, compassionate one". Schaub also reviewed the release for Men's Journal where he commented about Simone's viewpoint on pop music fandom and its inclusion in the book. Kirkus Reviews writer Craig Marks found the portions where the author wrote about her previous profession as a dancer as "stunning" and called the book a "provocative analysis".

Naomi Fry from The New York Times appreciated the last chapter of Madonnaland with its exploration of Flying Wedge and other forgotten indie rock bands present in Bay City. However, she was critical of the book's initial chapters about Bay City's people and the interviews that Simone conducted, finding them to be not "meaningful enough to hold our attention". Fry also found the author's method of talking about her own musical aspects to be distracting, when she should have been analyzing the work of Madonna.
