= Conflict epidemiology =

Aspect of epidemiology

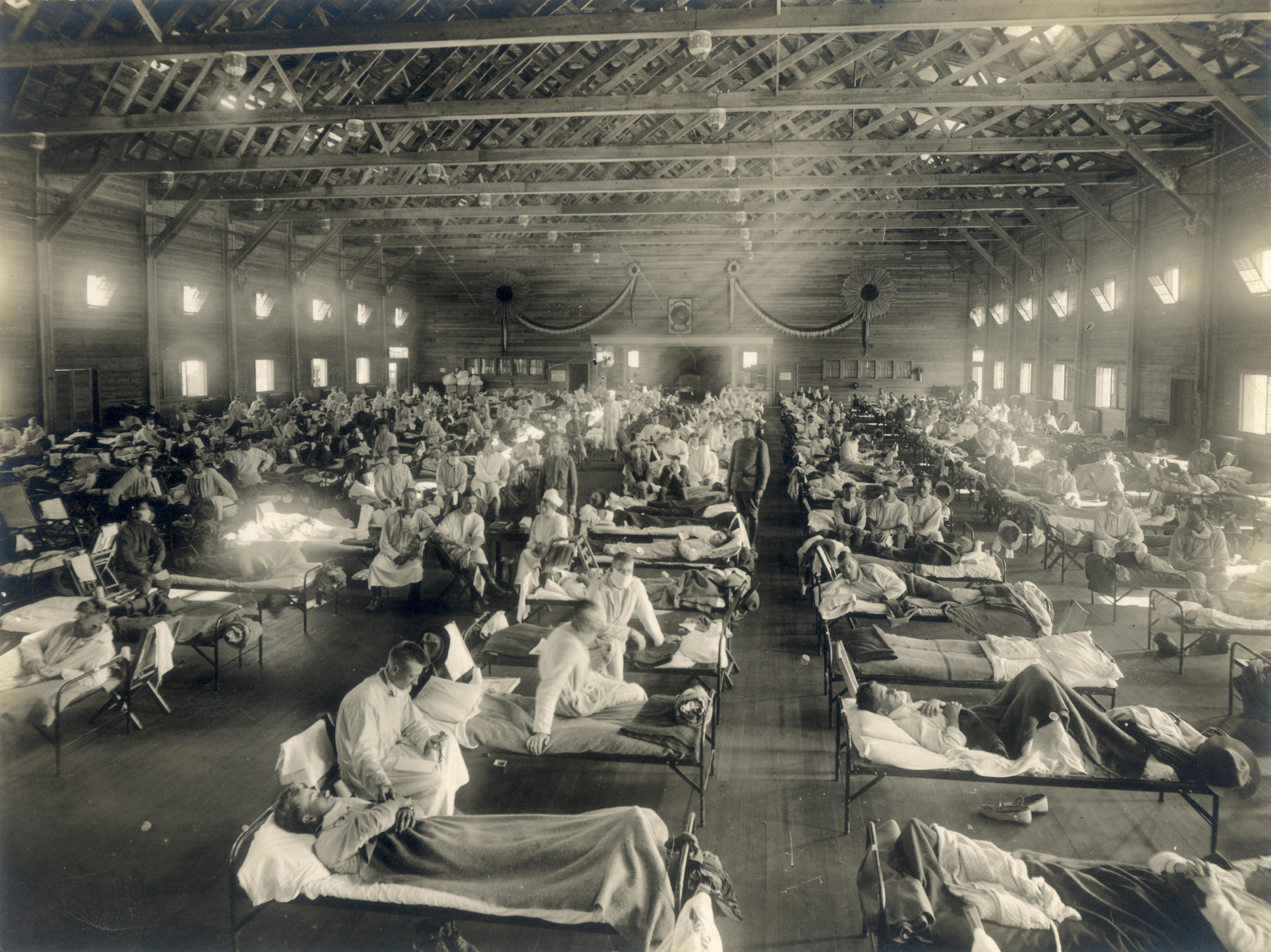
Emergency hospital during Influenza epidemic, Camp Funston, Kansas-1603

The emerging field of conflict epidemiology offers a more accurate method to measure deaths caused during violent conflicts or wars that can generate more reliable numbers than before to guide decision-makers.

In February 2001 the Carter Center and the United States Institute of Peace (USIP), in collaboration with CARE, Emory University and the Centers for Disease Control and Prevention (CDC), sponsored a meeting on "Violence and Health". The goals of the meeting were to determine the impact of violent conflict on public health and to advise public health training programs on means to enhance the work of public health professionals in working in violent conflicts.

Compiling or estimating the numbers of deaths caused during wars and other violent conflicts is a controversial subject. Historians often put forward many different estimates of the numbers killed during historic conflicts. What conflict epidemiology offers is a better methodology to more accurately estimate actual mortality rates during existing wars and conflict.

As war is a leading cause of illness and death, there are those in the field of public health who argue "war epidemiology" should be a more prominent component of the field of public health.

== Health effects ==
Clarence C Tam et al. provide a conceptual framework for conflict epidemiology, listing the following public health effects stemming from conflicts.

=== Direct effects ===
- Death
- Injury
- Torture

=== Indirect effects ===
- Collapse of health infrastructure
- Environmental impact, such as pollution
- Loss of basic commodities, such as power and water
- Chronic and acute malnutrition
- Effects on psychological health
- Unexploded ordnance and landmines
- Infectious disease (waterborne diseases, contagious infections and vector-borne disease, STIs and sexual assault)

== Modern conflict ==
=== Lancet survey of 2003 U.S. invasion of Iraq ===
The subject of conflict epidemiology made headline news after a report of a survey was conducted that detailed changes in the mortality rate of several clusters of Iraqi civilians surveyed throughout the country from 2003-2006. Data were collected by local Iraqi doctors from May 2006 to July 2006 and analysed by the faculty of Johns Hopkins School of Public Health. The results of this study indicated that the burden of warfare on the Iraqi people in the region doubled from May 2006 to July 2006, and an excess of 600,000 deaths were suggested to be attributed to the onset of the war. This trend was indicated to have followed for violent and non-violent deaths alike.

=== Russo-Ukrainian War (2014–present) ===
Escalations in tensions between Russia and Ukraine beginning in 2022 resulting in armed conflict have resulted in a rapidly deteriorating humanitarian crisis from 2022 to the present. An unprecedented 82 attacks on civilian and humanitarian healthcare centers in the region have resulted in widespread communicable disease, displaced youth, and millions of refugees without access to consistent healthcare delivery. In addition to the health effects seen as a direct result of military in the region, Ukraine's ability to respond to the current conflict has suffered from an insufficient healthcare workforce prior to the escalation in military activity in 2022.

== Challenges ==
Epidemiology of conflict suffers from a unique set of challenges that present clear barriers to our understandings of health outcomes in war torn areas. Areas experiencing high levels of armed conflict suffer from destroyed and fragmented health systems, making both health surveillance and procurement of necessary resources difficult. Furthermore, comprehensive access to affected parts of the population are often hindered, resulting in a lack of standardized data collection necessary to properly investigate health outcomes.

== See also ==
- Lancet surveys of casualties of the Iraq War
- Russo-Ukrainian War
