= James Naremore =

James O. Naremore, a film, English, and literature scholar, is Chancellor’s Professor Emeritus of English, Comparative Literature, and the Media School at Indiana University Bloomington. Naremore is best known for his writings on film history, genre, and theory, and for his studies of film noir and directors Orson Welles, Alfred Hitchcock, Stanley Kubrick, Vincente Minnelli, Charles Burnett, and Pedro Costa.

== Academic career ==
Naremore began teaching at Indiana University in 1970 as an assistant professor of English, and was promoted to associate professor in 1973 and professor in 1977. He served multiple terms as Director of Film Studies between 1976 and 1994, and in 1994 was appointed Chancellor’s Professor. He has also held visiting and guest professorships at the University of Hamburg (1980–81), the University of Chicago (2001, 2007, 2012), the School of the Art Institute of Chicago (2010), and the University of California, Los Angeles (2013).

== Honors and awards ==
Naremore has received numerous awards for scholarship and teaching. Early recognitions include the Lilly Open Fellowship (1983–84), Indiana University Summer Faculty Fellowships (1976, 1982, 1986, 1994), and the Albert Markham Fellowship at the University of Wisconsin (1972–73). In 2000, his book More Than Night: Film Noir in Its Contexts won the International Kraszna-Krausz Moving-Image Book Award and a commendation from the Society for Cinema Studies’ Kovács Book Prize. In 2007, On Kubrick was shortlisted for the Kraszna-Krausz Moving-Image Book Award. He has received a Guggenheim Fellowship (1995–96), an Alisa Mellon Bruce Senior Research Fellowship at the Center for Advanced Study in the Visual Arts, National Gallery of Art (1994–95), and a National Endowment for the Humanities Summer Fellowship (1977). Additional distinctions include the Jim Welsh Award for Excellence in Adaptation Studies (2017), the Academy of Motion Picture Arts and Sciences Scholars Award (2014), the Tracy M. Sonneborn Prize for Distinguished Teaching and Research, and multiple teaching excellence awards at Indiana University.

== Research and scholarship ==
Naremore’s early writings were centered on modern British literature. He is the author of The World Without a Self: Virginia Woolf and the Novel (1973) and essays on James Joyce, the imagist poets, and Philip Larkin.

Soon, however, he devoted his career exclusively to writings about film. He is the author of The Filmguide to Psycho (1973), Acting in the Cinema (1988), An Invention Without a Future: Essays on Cinema (2014), and Some Versions of Cary Grant (2022). He also wrote short “BFI Film Classics” volumes on the 1957 film Sweet Smell of Success (2010) and the 1948 film Letter from and Unknown Woman (2021). Both On Kubrick and The Magic World of Orson Welles were issued in revised and expanded editions (2023 and 2015 respectively). His award-winning More Than Night: Film Noir in Its Contexts was also expanded in a later edition to include chapters that explore the evolution of film noir into the twenty-first century and its enduring cultural impact, examining noir as a critical concept, stylistic category, and source of creative influence across media and eras. In his 2019 Film Noir: A Very Short Introduction, Naremore traces the origin of the term film noir from French literary and critical discourse to its broad international application, offering analysis on how noir has been shaped by modernism, censorship, stylistic variation, and contemporary media environments.

In, 2025, Naremore was the subject of a book-length interview, Cinema Then and Now, conducted by Craig S. Simpson. This book covers his life, teaching, publications, and ideas about a wide range of topics among them criticism, TV streaming, genre, adaptation, collaboration, and film preservation. In that same year, he and Darlene J. Sadlier were co-authors of The Haunted Cinema of Pedro Costa.

== Bibliography ==
- The World Without a Self: Virginia Woolf and the Novel. New Haven: Yale Univ. Press. 1973. ISBN 978-0-300-01594-2.
- Filmguide to Psycho. Bloomington: Indiana Univ. Press. 1973. ISBN 978-0-253-39307-4.
- Acting in the Cinema. Berkeley Los Angeles London: Univ. of California Press. 1988. ISBN 978-0-520-91066-9.
- Modernity and Mass Culture. Bloomington: Indiana Univ. Press. 1997. ISBN 0-253-20627-8.
- The Films of Vincente Minnelli. Cambridge: Cambridge Univ. Press. 1993. ISBN 0-521-38770-1.
- More Than Night: Film Noir in its Contexts. Berkeley Los Angeles London: Univ. of California Press. 1998. ISBN 0-520-21294-0.
- Film Adaptation. New Brunswick: Rutgers Univ. Press. 2000. ISBN 978-0-8135-2813-7.
- Sweet Smell of Success. Camden: Palgrave Macmillan. 2010. ISBN 978-1-84457-288-5.
- An Invention Without a Future: Essays on Cinema. Berkeley Los Angeles London: Univ. of California Press. 2014. ISBN 978-0-520-27973-5.
- Charles Burnett: A Cinema of Symbolic Knowledge. Berkeley Los Angeles London: Univ. of California Press. 2017. ISBN 978-0-520-28553-8.
- On Kubrick. Bloomsbury: Bloomsbury Academic. 2007. ISBN 978-1-84457-142-0.
- The Magic of Orson Welles. Urbana, Chicago and Springfield: Univ. of Illinois Press. 2015. ISBN 978-0-252-08131-6.
- Film Noir: A Very Short Introduction. Oxford: Oxford Univ. Press. 2019. ISBN 978-0-19-879174-4.
- Letter From an Unknown Woman. Bloomsbury: Bloomsbury Academic. 2019. ISBN 978-1-83902-234-0.
- Some Versions of Cary Grant. Oxford: Oxford Univ. Press. 2022. ISBN 978-0-19-756638-1.
- Cinema Then and Now. New York: Sticking Place Books. 2025. ISBN 979-8-89976-001-3.
- The Haunted Cinema of Pedro Costa. Indiana University Press. 2025. ISBN 9780253073242.
