= Patrice Oppliger =

American communications professor (born 1963)

- Born: 26 August 1963 (age 63)
- Education: University of Alabama
- Scientific career
- Fields: Popular culture
- Workplaces: Boston University College of Communication

Patrice A. Oppliger (born 26 August 1963), is the assistant professor of communication at Boston University College of Communication.

Oppliger has written extensively about the impact of popular culture on student's high school years, and has been consulted by the media on the subject. Interviewed by CNN about cyberbullying, Oppliger discussed the film "Mean Girls", which is based on the book "Queen Bees and Wannabes" by Rosalind Wiseman. Oppliger accused the film of "glamorizing bad behavior", she went on to say that, "The book is a helpful guide to relationships between girls; the movie, on the other hand, showed the positive side of being a mean girl."

WFXT Fox25 News also interviewed Oppliger about Rockport High School's decision to ban female students from wearing yoga pants. She said that the school ought to have judged the students on a "case-by-case" basis instead.

== Education ==
Patrice Oppliger gained her degree from the University of Nebraska at Kearney, her master's from the University of Maine, and her doctorate University of Alabama.

== Bibliography ==
=== Books ===
- Oppliger, Patrice (2004). Wrestling and hypermasculinity. Jefferson, North Carolina: McFarland & Company, Inc., Publishers. ISBN 9780786481361.
- Oppliger, Patrice (2008). Girls gone skank: the sexualization of girls in American culture. Jefferson, North Carolina: McFarland and Company Inc., Publishers. ISBN 9780786435227.
- Oppliger, Patrice (2013). Bullies and mean girls in popular culture. Jefferson, North Carolina: McFarland & Company, Inc., Publishers. ISBN 9780786468652.

=== Chapters in books ===
- Oppliger, Patrice (2007), "Effects of gender stereotyping on socialization", in Preiss, Raymond W.; Gayle, Barbara Mae; Burrell, Nancy; Allen, Mike; Bryant, Jennings (eds.), Mass media effects research: advances through meta-analysis, Mahwah, New Jersey: L. Erlbaum Associates, pp. 199–214, ISBN 9780805849981

=== Journal articles ===
==== Mainstream press ====
- Reuell, Peter (29 April 2008). "'Sexy' Cyrus photo spread puts parents in a tough spot". Pembroke Mariner & Express, Wicked local. "Oppliger doesn't believe the photos will spark a rash of nude or semi-nude photography among Cyrus's `tween' and teen fan base, but only because many of those fans are taking those pictures already."
- Burnett III, James H. (4 February 2013). "Men finding new hobbies to help relax, socialize". Boston Globe | Lifestyle. "Since men are marrying later, they tend to like hobbies and organizations that either include women or have the potential to lead them to women."
- Menon, Vinay (15 November 2013). "Mainstreaming of mean: Our age of nastiness, deceit and malice". Toronto Star Newspaper. "I feel like it used to be if one of our friends fell down, we'd wait to see if they were OK before we laughed. I feel like we just laugh now."

==== Academic journals ====
- Oppliger, Patrice A.; Sherblom, John C. (1988). "Late night with David Letterman: A humorous balance". Communication Research Reports. 5 (2): 193–196. doi:10.1080/08824098809359823.
- Oppliger, Patrice A.; Sherblom, John C. (1990). "David Letterman, his audience, his jokes, and their relationship". Communication Research Reports. 7 (1): 15–19. doi:10.1080/08824099009359848.
- Oppliger, Patrice A.; Sherblom, John C. (1992). "Humor: incongruity, disparagement, and David Letterman". Communication Research Reports. 9 (1): 99–108. doi:10.1080/08824099209359901.
- Oppliger, Patrice A.; Zillmann, Dolf (January 1997). "Disgust in humor: its appeal to adolescents". Humor: International Journal of Humor Research. 10 (4): 421–437. doi:10.1515/humr.1997.10.4.421. S2CID 144668923.
- Oppliger, Patrice A.; Aylor, Brooks (2003). "Out-of-class communication and student perceptions of instructor humor orientation and socio-communicative style". Communication Education. 52 (2): 122–134. doi:10.1080/03634520302469. S2CID 145104142.
