= List of academic publishing works on Madonna =

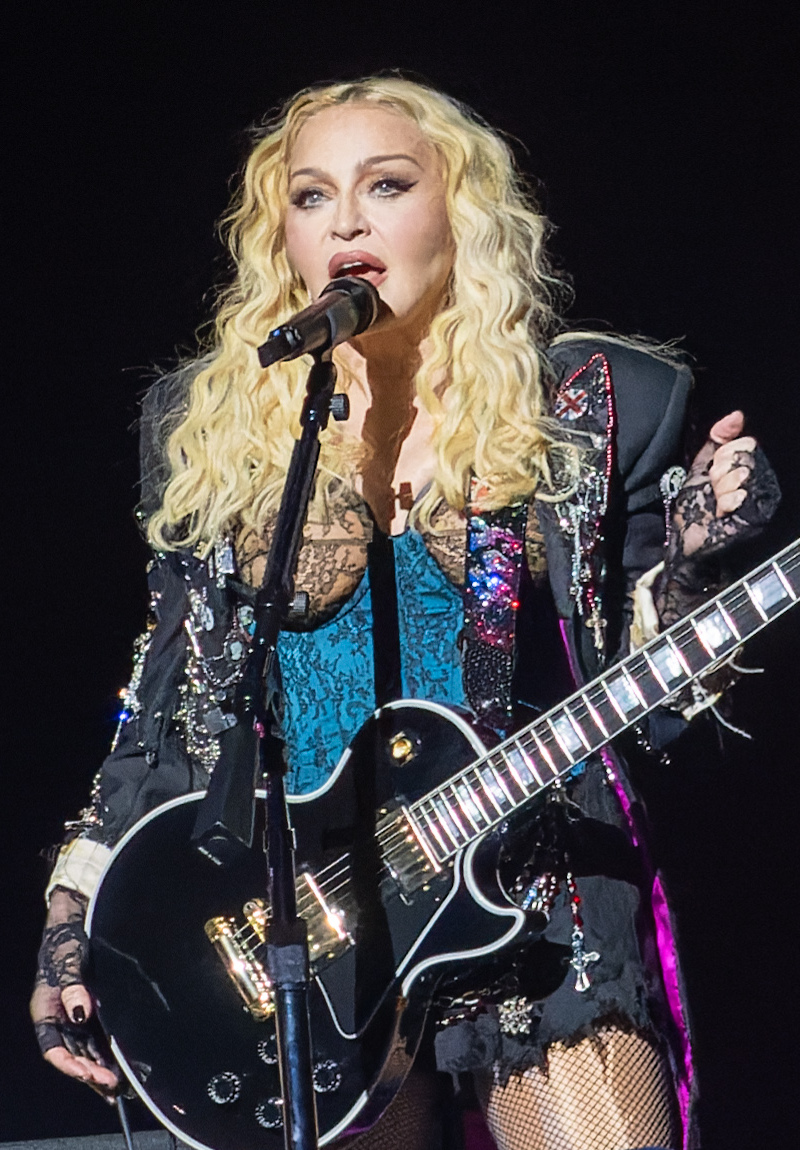
Madonna seen on the Celebration Tour, in 2023.

Madonna's life and work have been the subject of various academics works, including scholarly articles and other published works, mostly covered by literary and academic journals as well as by other educational publishers like those from university presses. The list is limited to only those that appeared first by a peer-reviewed outlet, or published in compendiums. (Note: To avoid predatory publishing, this list is limited to include pieces of papers or articles published by academic journals or educational and scholarly publishers, and as possible through peer reviews but exceptions may apply.) Some works have been published in languages besides English.

The first scholarly article about her is believed to have been written in 1985. Scholar Suzanna Danuta Walters commented that there has been "at least one major academic text devoted to Madonna", while professor Jane Desmond has commented, "the relevant bibliography is vast". Australian historian Robert Aldrich once commented she is a "performer of inimitable ubiquity" in the academia as she "has saturated the pages of academic journals". To Alina Simone, in her academic studies "there is no dearth of material about Madonna, but an overwhelming excess". Associate professor José F. Blanco, wrote in The Journal of Popular Culture that "it can be argued that Madonna is overexposed in academic research".

Theses such as Like a thesis: postmodern readings of Madonna music videos (1991) by Madonna scholar Charles W Wells are included because they received academic and press coverage. In 1998, French academic Georges-Claude Guilbert wrote his thesis Madonna: un mythe postmoderne. Other publications received citations from various scholars and observers appearing in citation indexes, or were preserved by university libraries. In addition, some theses have been published as books. Music professor Antoni Pizà noted that during the late 20th century, it became a fad in the United States to write doctoral dissertations on Madonna. American journalist Hank Stuever said that dissertations about Madonna piled up, and some were collected into a tome called The Madonna Connection (1993). She has been a subject of multiple lectures around the world.

== Academic and critical journal articles ==
=== In English ===
Title	Year	Author(s)	Journal	Pages	Identifiers	Notes	Ref(s).
Madonna	1987	Harold Jaffe	Performing Arts Journal	17–20	ISSN 0735-8393 OCLC 5547996728; Vol. 10 issue 3	An essay about Madonna.	
Living to Tell: Madonna’s Resurrection of the Fleshly	1990	Susan McClary	Genders	148–166	ISSN 0894-9832 OCLC 8162179881 issue 7	A study on Madonna and her music.	
The Effects of Race, Gender, and Fandom on Audience Interpretations of Madonna's Music Videos	1990	Jane D. Brown; Laurie Schulze	Journal of Communication	88–102	ISSN 0021-9916 OCLC 4636223012; Vol. 40 issue 2	An audience reception using Madonna's videos "Papa Don't Preach" and "Open Your Heart".	
Like a critique: A postmodern essay on Madonna's postmodern video like a prayer	1991	Stephen E. Young	Popular Music and Society	59–68	ISSN 0300-7766 OCLC 4804765831; Vol. 15 issue 1	A study on video of "Like a Prayer".	
Madonna	1991/92	Jane Miller	Ploughshares	221–230	ISSN 0048-4474 OCLC 5542946647; Vol. 17 issue 4	Literary studies on Madonna.	
The Laugh of Madonna: Censorship and Oppositional Discourse	1992	Greta Gaard	The Journal of the Midwest Modern Language Association	41–46	ISSN 0742-5562 OCLC 5552824344; Vol. 25 issue 1	A study on Madonna and her music.	
Our Lady of MTV: Madonna's "Like a Prayer"	1992	Carla Freccero	Boundary 2	163–183	ISSN 0190-3659 OCLC 5552668908; Vol. 19 issue 2	Commentaries about Madonna and her video "Like a Prayer" as well, the Madonna scholars.	
Madonna's postmodern feminism: Bringing the margins to the center	1992	Cathy Schwichtenberg	Southern Communication Journal	120–131	ISSN 1041-794X OCLC 4804864726; Vol. 57 issue 2	Essay about how Madonna used postmodernism to challenge accepted norms of sex and gender.	
Justify My Ideology: Madonna and traditional values	1992	Janelle L. Wilson; Gerald E. Markle	Popular Music and Society	75–84	ISSN 0300-7766 OCLC 936733513; Vol. 16 issue 2	A criticism and analysis of the music video for Madonna's song, "Justify My Love" (1990).	
Like a virgin-mother?: materialism and maternalism in the songs of Madonna	1992	Barbara Bradby	Cultural Studies	73–96	ISSN 0950-2386 OCLC 936734005; Vol. 6 issue 1	A criticism and analysis of the music video for Madonna's song, "Material Girl" (1984).	
Sex, Madonna, & Mia: Press Reflections	1993	Daniel Harris	The Antioch Review	503–518	ISSN 0003-5769 OCLC 5544132373; Vol. 51 issue 4	Talks about press reaction towards Madonna's book Sex.	
Madonna's Sex: Constitutional Stewardship or Administrative Fantasies?	1993	Douglas F. Morgan	Administrative Theory & Praxis	37–51	ISSN 1084-1806 OCLC 5790952095; Vol. 15 issue 2	Examines reaction towards Madonna's book Sex.	
Madonna	1993	Steve Allen	The Journal of Popular Culture	1–12	ISSN 0022-3840 OCLC 439255149; Vol. 27 issue 1	A criticism and analysis of Madonna as a public figure.	
Feminist assessment of emancipatory potential and Madonna's contradictory gender practices	1996	D. Lynn O'Brien Hallstein	Quarterly Journal of Speech	125–141	ISSN 0033-5630 OCLC 4659170142; Vol. 82 issue 2	A feminist‐schizoanally piece noted that the hallmark of Madonna's career was her contradictory play with gender roles and images.	
Electrifying Fragments: Madonna and Postmodern Performance	1996	Mark Watts	New Theatre Quarterly	99–107	ISSN 1474-0613; Vol. 12 issue 46	Studied Madonna's image in terms of the concept of "punctum" a concept defined by Roland Barthes.	
Like a Prophet - On Christian Interpretations of a Madonna Video	1996	Andreas Häger	Scripta Instituti Donneriani Aboensis	151–174	ISSN 0582-3226 OCLC 8081124376; Vol. 16	An analysis on "Like a Prayer" since Christian and art perspectives.	
Madonna — mother of mirrors	1997	John Castles	Cultural Studies	138–187	ISSN 0950-2386 OCLC 196712006; Vol. 11 issue 1	—N/a	
The Aesthetics of Music Video: An Analysis of Madonna's 'Cherish'	1998	Carol Vernallis	Popular Music	153–185	ISSN 0261-1430 OCLC 206572402; Vol. 17 issue 2	Focused in her video "Cherish".	
Not an Immaculate Reception: ideology, The Madonna Connection, and academic wannabes	1999	Laurie Schulze	Velvet Light Trap	37 (pages)	ISSN 1542-4251 OCLC 358970432; Vol. 22 issue 5	Examines the criticism towards Madonna scholars by her own experience.	
Madonna and Hypertext: Liberatory Learning in Art Education	2000	Pamela G. Taylor	Studies in Art Education	376–389	ISSN 0039-3541 OCLC 5544294596; Vol. 41 issue 4	Examines the use of computer hypertext as a base for art education in high school and used Madonna's videos as example.	
The Madonna Experience: A U.S. Icon Awakens a Puerto Rican Adolescent's Feminist Consciousness	2001	Carmen R. Lugo-Lugo	Frontiers: A Journal of Women Studies	118–130	ISSN 0160-9009 OCLC 936906159; Vol. 22 issue 2	Talks about Madonna's Puerto Rican performance from her Girlie Show in 1993, and the impact she had in the country.	
Trollope's Material Girl	2002	Christoph Lindner	The Yearbook of English Studies	36–51	ISSN 0306-2473; Vol. 32	Essay takes the 'Madonna phenomenon' as its point of departure to propose that, far from being unique to postmodernity, the representational project that emerges from Madonna's "Material Girl" song already motivated cultural production in the nineteenth century.	
Material Girl or Managerial Girl? Charting Madonna's brand ambition	2003	Stephen Brown	Business Horizons	2–10	ISSN 0007-6813 OCLC 4636197942; Vol. 46 issue 4	Talks about Madonna's brand in the perspective of business and marketing.	
All You Need Is LAV: Madonna and Postmodern Kabbalah	2005	Boaz Huss	The Jewish Quarterly Review	611–624	ISSN 0021-6682 OCLC 5792119843; Vol. 95 issue 4	Madonna's study of Kabbalah and integrating Kabbalistic themes in her cultural productions.	
"Sigmund Freud, Analyze This": How Madonna Situates "Die Another Day" Beyond the Pleasure Principle	2006	David Sigler	Studies in Popular Culture	77–97	ISSN 0888-5753 OCLC 5543266231; Vol. 29 issue 1	—N/a	
The Semiotics of Performance and Success in Madonna	2012	José I. Prieto‐Arranz	The Journal of Popular Culture	173–196	ISSN 0022-3840 OCLC 4824619896; Vol. 45 issue 1	Talks about Madonna's long -standing success.	
Madonna as a symbol of reflexive modernisation	2013	Marguerite van den Berg; Claartje L ter Hoeven	Celebrity Studies	144–154	ISSN 1939-2397 OCLC 5140465648; Vol. 4 issue 2	Discuss the communication of social and cultural tensions embodied in Madonna.	
From Old Media Whore to New Media Troll: The online negotiation of Madonna's ageing body	2013	Kristyn Gorton; Joanne Garde-Hansen	Feminist Media Studies	288–302	ISSN 1468-0777 OCLC 4824619896; Vol. 13 issue 2	Commentaries about Madonna's age and body since a feminist perspective.	
How to Fashion an Archetype: Madonna as Anima Figure	2014	José Blanco F.	The Journal of Popular Culture	1153–1166	ISSN 0022-3840 OCLC 5730312405; Vol. 47 issue 6	Talks about Madonna's image, such as her reinvention, identities and her cultural impact.	
The Icon and the Text: American Book History and the Construction of the World's Largest-Grossing Illustrated Book, Madonna's Sex (1992)	2020	Manav Ratti	Journal of American Studies	184–211	ISSN 0021-8758 OCLC 8515369715	Examines Madonna's success of her first book Sex.	

=== Non-English ===
Title	Year	Author(s)	Journal	Language	Pages	Identifiers	Notes	Ref(s).
Watching Madonna: Anmerkungen zu einer feministischen Medien-/Geschlechterforschung	1996	Ute Bechdolf	Essen: Die blaue Eule	German	23–44	OCLC 936805311	An essay on Madonna and her cultural impact.	
L'autobiographie post-moderne, "post-mortem": Madonna auto(bio)graphe	2002	Olivier Sécardin	L'Esprit Créateur	French	66–75	ISSN 0014-0767 OCLC 203572273; Vol. 42 issue 4	Socio-cultural study on Madonna.	
Die Another Day: Madonna and the Post-Modern Kabbalah (למות ביום אחר: מדונה והקבלה הפוסט-מודרנית)	2002	Boaz Huss (בועז הוס)	Zmanim: A Historical Quarterly (זמנים: רבעון להיסטוריה)	Hebrew	4–11	ISSN 1565-5261 OCLC 5559592424 issue 91	A study of Madonna's song "Die Another Day".	
Madonna'nın Feminizmi: Postmodern Bir Kimlik Sorunsalı (The Feminism of Madonna: A Postmodern Identity Dilemma)	2008	Çağlar Özbek	Toplum ve Demokrasi Dergisi	Turkish	91–106	ISSN 1307-4687 OCLC 8254476820; Vol. 4 issue 2	The study analysis through Madonna, as an important representation of postmodern identity the feminism, postmodernism and identity.	
Construção de persona midiática: um estudo de caso da pop star Madonna	2011	Samuel dos Santos Pereira; Lenise Lantelme	Revista científica da faminas	Portuguese	1–38	ISSN 1807-6912; Vol. 7 issue 1	A post-structuralism analysis on Madonna's work.	
«Um rosto tão conhecido quanto o nosso próprio»: a construção da imagem pública e da idolatria a Madonna	2011	Patricia Coralis	Comunicação & cultura	Portuguese	99–115	ISSN 1646-4877 issue 12	As part of the "Fãs e celebridades" commentaries.	
Mujeres, violencia y posfeminismo en los vídeos de Madonna	2014	Iolanda Tortajada; Núria Araüna	Área Abierta	Spanish	23–41	ISSN 2530-7592 OCLC 5698925424; Vol. 14 issue 3	A study based on Madonna's videos analyzing post-feminism theory.	
Nem todas querem ser Madonna: representações sociais da mulher carioca, de 50 anos ou mais	2014	Cláudia da Silva; Pereira Afiliación	Estudos Feministas	Portuguese	173–193	ISSN 1806-9584 OCLC 5584893330; Vol. 22 issue 1	It focuses on Madonna and her age and modern media's reflection of what it means to be over 50 for a woman.	
Madonna, 'sex' e o fetichismo pós-moderno	2019	Roney Gusmão	Sociologia: Revista da Faculdade de Letras da Universidade do Porto	Portuguese	71–87	ISSN 0872-3419 OCLC 8562112102; Vol. 38	A postdoctoral research.	
Los vídeos musicales de Madonna como performances audiovisuales	2022	Massimiliano Stramaglia	Cuadernos De Investigación Musical	Spanish & English	151–162	ISSN 2530-6847 OCLC 9524424982 issue 15	Studies of Madonna's performances.	

=== Partial and secondary ===
Title	Year	Author(s)	Journal	Pages	Identifiers	Notes	Ref(s).
Musicologists, Sociologists and Madonna	1993	John Street	Innovation: The European Journal of Social Science Research	277–289	ISSN 1351-1610 OCLC 4814972514; Vol. 6 issue 3	Studies how the popular music has been dominated largely by sociology, rather than musicology with a particular focus on Madonna.	
Strike a pose: the framing of Madonna and Frida Kahlo	1993	Janis Bergman-Carton	Texas Studies in Literature and Language	440–452	ISSN 0040-4691 OCLC 936740050; Vol. 35 issue 4	Explores Frida Kahlo-Madonna relation and how her art proliferated throughout the world since the singer confessed to being her fan.	
Legal Radicals in Madonna's Closet: The Influence of Identity Politics, Popular Culture, and a New Generation on Critical Legal Studies	1994	Duncan Kennedy	Stanford Law Review	1835–1861	ISSN 0038-9765 OCLC 201509703; Vol. 46 issue 6	Piece was reviewed by legal scholar Naomi Mezey.	
Shakespeare's Cleopatra, the Male Gaze, and Madonna: Performance Dilemmas	1995	Elizabeth Schafer	Contemporary Theatre Review	7–16	ISSN 1477-2264 OCLC 264473208; Vol. 2 issue 3	Cross-reference male gaze analysis on Cleopatra and Madonna.	
The making of matriarchy: A comparison of Madonna and Margaret Thatcher	1997	Linda Leung	Journal of Gender Studies	33–42	ISSN 0958-9236 OCLC 838734562; Vol. 6 issue 1	The article reviews a selection of the plethora of academic literature available on Madonna and the limited amount on Thatcher. Explores subjects such as matriarchy.	
Angelina and Madonna: Why All the Fuss?: an Exploration of the Rights of the Child and Intercountry Adoption within African Nations	2007	Veronica S Root	Chicago Journal of International Law	323–354	ISSN 1529-0816 OCLC 779241243; Vol. 8 issue 1 art. 1	Explore the issues of the international adoptions by celebrities, focused in the cases of Angelina Jolie and Madonna.	
Madonna or Don McLean? The effect of order of exposure on relative liking	2010	Mario Pandelaere; Kobe Millet; Bram Van den Bergh	Journal of Consumer Psychology	442–451	ISSN 1057-7408 OCLC 8086884823; Vol. 20 issue 4	Talks about the effects of order; for example listening to one version of a song before another. They used as an example Don McLean's "American Pie" and Madonna's cover of that song.	
Toward a Concept of Post-Postmodernism or Lady Gaga’s Reconfigurations of Madonna	2013	Danuta Fjellestad; Maria Engberg	Reconstruction: Studies in Contemporary Culture	1–2	ISSN 1547-4348 OCLC 924306621; Vol. 12 issue 4	An essay that talks about post-postmodernism with the Gaga-Madonna relation.	
Hating Madonna and loving Tom Ford: gender, affect and the ‘extra-curricular’ celebrity	2014	Misha Kavka	Celebrity Studies	59–74	ISSN 1939-2397 OCLC 5575739865; Vol. 5 issue 1–2	Explore criticisms towards Madonna's film W.E., and commentaries from Naomi Wolf on the case, comparing how Tom Ford received "rapturous" reviews with A Single Man to further suggests a gender bias to Madonna as artist.	
Celebrity as Celebration of Privatization in Global Development: A Critical Feminist Analysis of Oprah, Madonna, and Angelina	2015	Karin G. Wilkins	Communication, Culture & Critique	163–181	ISSN 1753-9129 OCLC 6895822158; Vol. 8 issue 2	Explore the global philanthropy by media figures through the case of Oprah Winfrey, Angelina Jolie and Madonna.	

== Conferences, congresses, seminar and courses ==
Madonna has been the subject of multiple lectures around the world. Following are a few examples:

Title	Year	Author(s)	Institution	Language	Pages	Identifiers	Notes	Ref(s).
Madonna: Feminist Icon or Material Girl?	1993	Women's Center	University of California, Santa Barbara	English	—	—	Held in January 1993, Santa Barbara, University of California, and organized by the Women's Center.	
Studies In Gender & Performance: Madonna Undressed	1993	Polly McLean	University of Colorado	English	—	—	According to Polly McLean, an assistant journalist professor, the point of the class was "to get students to apply critical means of analysis to areas that are contemporary in society". She played Madonna songs and videos as part of the class, emphasizing issues raised in their images.	
Issues In Gender & Media Performance: The Madonna Phenomenon	1994	Various	University of Colorado	English	—	—	The objective of the course was to formulate new ways to look at performance, via the performer. Using Madonna's videos and films explore the presentation of gender in costuming, makeup, gesturing and movement.	
Madonna: The Music and the Phenomenon	1997	Andrew Japless et alii	University of Amsterdam	Dutch	—	—	A 40-hours class examining just what makes Madonna tick. More than 200 students signed to the course and their knowledge was tested in a final examination. They used resources such as the book The Madonna Connection (1993) or a Dutch book about Madonna's lyrics of more than 200 songs recorded by the singer.	
20 Years of Madonna: New Approaches to Madonna's Cultural Transformations'	2001	Call for papers	Cambridge University Press	English	293–294	ISSN 0261-1430 OCLC 206572402; Vol. 20 issue 2	Talks about Madonna's 20 years of career covering topics such as multiculturalism, all-American culture and motherhood among others. According to academic journal Music Theory Online, it was also presented to the International Association for the Study of Popular Music (IASPM). It was published in the academic journal Popular Music.	
La traducción de Madonna	2005	Lydia Brugué	Comillas Pontifical University	Spanish	703–712	ISBN 84-8468-151-3 OCLC 758227582	Translation studies based on Madonna's music presented in the international congress at the Asociación de Investigación y Especialización sobre Temas Iberoamericanos (AIETI).	
Case one: Madonna	2008	Robert M. Grant	Wiley-Blackwell	English	1–4	—	A case study of Madonna's enduring success and applied in the marketing discourse.	
Madonna On the Couch': A psychoanalytic view on Madonna's music videos	2008	Matthias Groß	University of Leipzig	English	22 (pages)	ISBN 978-3640104598	Seminar paper from the year 2007 and published in 2008. Discuss psychoanalysis with Sigmund Freud theories using Madonna and her music videos in particular.	
A influência das artes no videoclipe Vogue (1990) da cantora Madonna	2012	Bruna Fernandes Barros; Rafael Jose Bona	Sociedade Brasileira de Estudos Interdisciplinares da Comunicação (Intercom)	Portuguese	14 (pages)	Congress n. XIII	Held at the XIII congress of Congresso de Ciências da Comunicação na Região Sul – Chapecó as part of the Sociedade Brasileira de Estudos Interdisciplinares da Comunicação (Intercom).	
MDNA forever	2012	Salvatore Bartolotta	Congreso Internacional de la Asociación Universitaria de Estudios de las Mujeres (AUDEM)	Spanish	65–76	—	Presented by Salvatore Bartolotta from National University of Distance Education at the Congreso Internacional de la Asociación Universitaria de Estudios de las Mujeres (AUDEM).	
"Who's that girl? Madonna y la cultura pop contemporánea"	2015	Various	University of Oviedo	Spanish	—	—	A series of classes started in September and finished in December 2015 by a varied of academic experts in different areas. It marked the first time Oviedo devoted a course to a female singer.	
Uma análise da carreira da cantora Madonna através de plataformas de divulgação de música	2016	Mateus Silomar; Alan Mangabeira Mascarenhas; Emerson da Cunha de Sousa; Maurício de Nassau	Sociedade Brasileira de Estudos Interdisciplinares da Comunicação (Intercom)	Portuguese	15 (pages)	Congress n. XVIII	Held at the XVIII congress of Congresso de Ciências da Comunicação na Região Nordeste – Caruaru as part of the Sociedade Brasileira de Estudos Interdisciplinares da Comunicação (Intercom) in which, was explored Madonna's career since the digital music era.	
Bitch I'm Madonna: As rupturas no roteiro perfomático de uma diva pop	2018	Tatyane Larrubia; Leonam Casagrande Dalla	Sociedade Brasileira de Estudos Interdisciplinares da Comunicação (Intercom)	Portuguese	15 (pages)	Congress n. 41	Held at the 41st congress of Congresso Brasileiro de Ciências da Comunicação – Joinville as part of the Sociedade Brasileira de Estudos Interdisciplinares da Comunicação (Intercom).	
China Studies Academic Seminar: Madonna goes East	2019	Chang Liu	Xi'an Jiaotong-Liverpool University	Chinese	—	—	Focuses on the construction of Madonna's star image in China and explores how Madonna's music was introduced to China.	

== Theses and dissertations ==
=== In English ===
Title	Year	Author(s)	Institution	Pages (total)	Identifiers	Notes	Ref(s).
Like a thesis: postmodern readings of Madonna music videos	1991	Charles W Wells	Florida State University	230	OCLC 25334230	It received academic attention and press coverage by outlets such as Orlando Sentinel and Tampa Bay Times.	
Madonna, the material girl revealed through dramatistic inquiry	1992	Margaret A Peverill	San Diego State University	68	OCLC 26435720	M.A. thesis.	
The Madonna phenomenon: a sociological perspective	1992	Carlos Iglesias	University of Houston	135	OCLC 27450076	Archived at University of Houston Libraries.	
Raunch or resistance: Making meanings of Madonna, a cultural studies approach to the rock video	1992	Elaine Marion Grodaes	University of Windsor	234	OCLC 30974548 ISBN 0315830352	Preserved also at the National Library of Canada and Leddy Library.	
Madonna: playing in the heart of darkness	1993	Charlotte Siobhan; Antonia O'Sullivan	University of California, Berkeley	134	OCLC 31175003	M.A. in English.	
Reading images of Madonna music videos	1997	Megan J Distler	Cedar Crest College	35	OCLC 39841810	A senior honors thesis.	
Re-(e)valu(ate/ing) Madonna : understanding the success of post-modernity's greatest diva	1999	Wesley Chinn	Harvard University	42	OCLC 41121575	It was featured in the guide of thesis at the university.	
Madonna, an American pop icon of feminism and counter-hegemony	2000	Audra Gaugler	Lehigh University	60	OCLC 46542029	As part of the department of history.	
Marketing Madonna: celebrity agency across the cultural industry	2006	Melissa West	York University	349	OCLC 231656076 ISBN 978-0494295373	Also preserved at Université du Québec à Rimouski.	
Madonna & Black Culture Appropriation in the MTV Generation	2007	Shawna J Strayhorn	Harvard University	70	OCLC 406696891	It was featured in the guide of thesis at the university.	
The commodification of religion within celebrity culture with special focus on Madonna and Kabbalah	2008	Courtney C Langille	Memorial University of Newfoundland	85	OCLC 456151487	Honours dissertation of B.A. Preserved at the Centre for Newfoundland Studies.	
Madonna's confession: sound, self, and survival in a love song	2008	Ross Joseph Fenimore	University of California, Los Angeles	218	OCLC 811147445	Ph.D dissertation.	
"Who's that girl?"-reconstructing gender: a cultural study of Madonna's music video	2014	Yingzi Zhao	Hong Kong Polytechnic University	117	OCLC 900239717	M.A. thesis.	

=== Non-English ===
Title	Year	Author(s)	Institution	Language	Pages (total)	Identifiers	Notes	Ref(s).
Madonna: un mythe postmoderne	1998	Georges-Claude Guilbert	Paris Nanterre University	French	2 (vol.)	OCLC 249286928	Thesis for English studies.	
"Express yourself - Madonna be with you": Madonna-Fans und ihre Lebenswelt	1998	Carina Schmiedke-Rindt	Augsburg University	German	347	OCLC 1071011779 ISBN 978-3926794338	A thesis that was later published as a book. It is preserved at the Harvard Library.	
Madonna: where's that girl? Starimage und Erotik im medialen Raum	2002	Jan-Oliver Decker	Kiel University	German	559	OCLC 181435915	To apply a doctorate in music videos.	
Madonna revidiert: Rekursivität im Videoclip	2004	Matthias Weiß	Free University of Berlin	German	301	OCLC 723656039 OCLC 884475351 ISBN 3496013621	It was later published as a book.	
Madonna: uma vida de marketing e mídia	2006	Natalia Vieira De Melo	Universidade Santa Cecília	Portuguese	94	—	—N/a	
La representació de cançons en gèneres audiovisuals musicals: Anàlisi de dos documentals musicals subtitulats i d'onze videoclips de Madonna	2008	Lydia Brugué	University of Vic - Central University of Catalonia	Catalan	222	OCLC 747615250	Explored the usage of subtitles through Madonna's music.	
Madonna as a cultural icon and a children's author: diplomsko delo	2009	Anže Perne	University of Ljubljana	Slovene	100	OCLC 781160704	—N/a	
A fabricação do ídolo pop: a análise textual de videoclipes e a construção da imagem de Madonna	2011	Rodrigo Ribeiro Barreto	Federal University of Bahia	Portuguese	200	—	Based on Madonna's videography and image.	
Das Spiel mit dem Ich: die Dekonstruktion postmoderner Medienikonen am Beispiel Madonna	2012	Henrike Wielk	University of Tübingen	German	193	OCLC 913200268 ISBN 978-3868215731	It was later published as a book in 2014.	
Like a Queen; Madonna und ihr Hof auf der Bühne in Zeiten des Social Media (Like a Queen - Madonna & the stage as court in the era of social media)	2013	Adam Louis Troldahl	University of Vienna	German	75	OCLC 7378245230	Published both in English and German.	
“You must be my Lucky Star”: Crítica, agendamento e valor sobre a obra da cantora Madonna na Revista Rolling Stone	2015	Maria Helena Guerra Monteiro	Federal University of Paraíba	Portuguese	150	—	It was cited in A revista Tropos: Comunicação, Sociedade e Cultura of Universidade Federal do Acre.	

== Book sources ==
- Desmond, Jane (2001). Dancing Desires: Choreographing Sexualities on and Off the Stage. University of Wisconsin Press. ISBN 0299170500.
- Fenner, Bevis; Hill, Stephen (2010). Media and Cultural Theory. Bookboon. ISBN 978-0-415-31705-4.
- Guilbert, Georges-Claude (2015). Madonna as Postmodern Myth. McFarland. ISBN 978-0-786-48071-5.
- Hall, Dennis; Hall, Susan G (2010). American Icons. Greenwood Publishing Group. ISBN 978-0-275-98431-1.
- Jeffreys, Sheila (2005). Beauty And Misogyny: Harmful Cultural Practices In The West. Routledge. ISBN 978-1-848-72448-8.
- Love, Joanna K. (2019). Soda Goes Pop: Pepsi-Cola Advertising and Popular Music. University of Michigan Press. ISBN 978-0472054022.
- Pizà, Antoni (2003). El doble silenci reflexions sobre música i músics (in Catalan). Edicions Documenta Balear. ISBN 8495694859.
- Walters, Suzanna Danuta (1995). Material girls: making sense of feminist cultural theory. University of California Press. ISBN 0520915682.
