= Madonna studies =

Cultural and media study of American singer

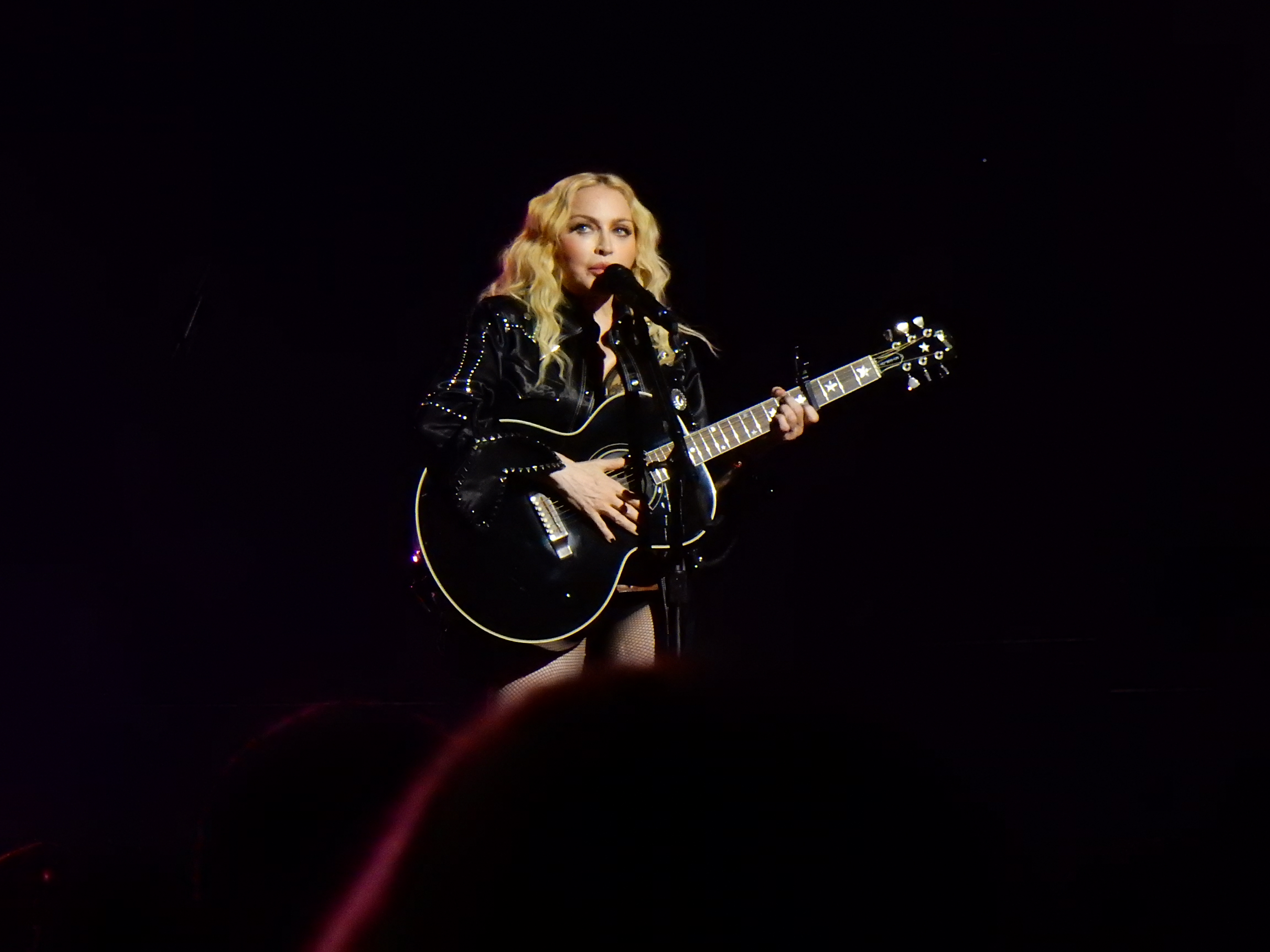
Madonna on stage at her Celebration tour in 2023

Madonna studies (also variously called Madonna scholarship, Madonna-ology, the Madonna phenomenon, and Madonnathinking) refers to the academic study of the work and life of the American singer-songwriter Madonna. The terms refer to any such studies, but in particular to those using an interdisciplinary approach incorporating cultural and media studies in a postmodern approach that began in the mid-1980s. Authors of these studies are sometimes called "Madonna scholars" or "Madonnologists"; E. Ann Kaplan and John Fiske are early examples. After Madonna's debut in 1983 and quick rise to stardom, the practice soon appeared, achieving its peak in the next decade. The academic attention has continued since. (Note: In Materialisations of a Woman Writer (2006), Swedish author Maria Wikse from Stockholm University (SU) wrote that "Madonna Studies remains an established field within Cultural Studies". She continued to receive academic discussions, and some courses, essays and journals were presented as an extension of the Madonna studies (University of Oviedo; 2018) or Manav Ratti (Journal of American Studies; 2018).)

These studies have especially treated of gender, feminism, race, multiculturalism, sexuality, and the mass media on the basis of Madonna's songs, videos, live performances, films, books, and interviews. The scholarship has stimulated increased academic examination of pop music and its performers and more broadly of popular entertainment, shaping American cultural studies, although public authorities such as the National Geographic Society have deemed it controversial. One early scholar of Madonna studies, the feminist writer Camille Paglia, criticized the field (along with popular culture studies more broadly) for its perceived "ill effect on students and an increasingly corrupt career system" in academia.

== Terminology ==
The field is commonly called Madonna studies, a phrase that appeared in the late 1980s, according to the writer Maura Johnston. Although some academics (such as David Gauntlett) called it that, others (including Janice Radway, Suzanna Danuta Walters, and Maureen Orth) instead called it Madonna-ology (or Madonnaology), others yet called it Madonna scholarship, another (E. Ann Kaplan) called it the Madonna Phenomenon, and some critics (such as Robert Christgau) called it Madonnathinking (or Madonnathink).

The wealth of academic scrutiny of Madonna and her influence created what some journalists and scholars (including Simon Frith, Michael Bérubé and Jon Pareles) disdainfully labeled the "Madonna industry," "Madonna business," and "Madonna boom."

== Origins and development ==
=== Background ===
Chilean literary critic Óscar Contardo places the Madonna studies in the context of the British cultural studies when the phenomenon of celebrities began to be analyzed from the 1970s. American historian Richard Wolin observed that the cultural studies approach expanded during the 1980s, adding that under the influence of Michel Foucault, as well as Stuart Hall and the Birmingham School, popular culture came to be viewed as a site of "resistance to power". It was in this context, Wolin argues, that the "Madonna studies" developed into an academic cottage industry.

In Madonna: A Biography (2007), Mary Cross argues that "the turmoil of new theory imported from Europe and the culture wars of ideology were bringing huge changes to the American academic world and the college curriculum". She notes that whole departments devoted to popular culture, women's studies and media studies emerged, and suggested that Madonna seemed to "illustrate extremely" well what was happening on the "embattled cultural ramparts" of late twentieth-century American, describing her as a "perfect example of the whole theory of postmodernism the academic world was suddenly so immersed in". Daniel Harries from The Nation similarly observed in 1992, that reflections of contemporary attitudes were occurring in the perception of popular art, not only among academics but also among mainstream pop critics.

In addition, literary scholar Luis Cárcamo-Huechante from Harvard University traces the origins of the Madonna studies to the camp sensibility associated with Susan Sontag's 1960s works referring to a "fascination of artifice and exaggeration", and what he perceives Madonna illustrated well. Associate professor Diane Pecknold in American Icons (2006) also discusses the camp sensibility adding that for most of the twentieth century, American scholars subscribed to the idea of an objective and universal canon and academics "were applying to Madonna the same sophisticated textual readings".

=== Spread ===
D Magazine talked about the Madonna scholarship in 1986. Robert Miklitsch, associate professor of Ohio University dates the start of Madonna studies to 1987 and Rocking Around The Clock: Music Television, Postmodernism & Consumer Culture by E. Ann Kaplan. According to Jon Pareles of The New York Times, Madonna was deemed "as a vehicle to open up issues". Pecknold also observed that her person was open to multiple interpretations, contributing to the rise of the Madonna studies.

Scholars such as E. Ann Kaplan and John Fiske represented Madonna to their academic audiences as an example of how popular culture can imitates critical theories of history, knowledge, and human identity, according to Annalee Newitz. "Of all the artists who rose to prominence through MTV, none has garnered more attention among academics than Madonna", wrote Murray Steib in Reader's Guide to Music (2013). Professor Michael Bérubé, analyzed the preference for Madonna rather than other act (such as Metallica) by academics, and argued in part, that this was possible because citizens of advanced Western democracies tend to be more engaged by and informed about figures like Madonna or by blockbuster films. An author suggested that "pop culture and Madonna are central to political issues", while, Harris from The Nation observed in 1992, that Madonna had come to be regarded in their academic discourses not simply as a pop star, but as "the most significant artist of the late twentieth century".

Academic Laurie Ouellette and Simon Frith noted the development of Madonna studies through courses, classroom discussions, academic journals, textbooks or conferences. French scholar Georges-Claude Guilbert writes in Madonna as Postmodern Myth (2002) that Princeton, Harvard, UCLA, the University of Colorado and Rutgers were among the first to offer courses about her. A magazine reported in 2012 that liberal arts colleges, such as the 7 sisters institutions, have taught courses on her cultural influence.

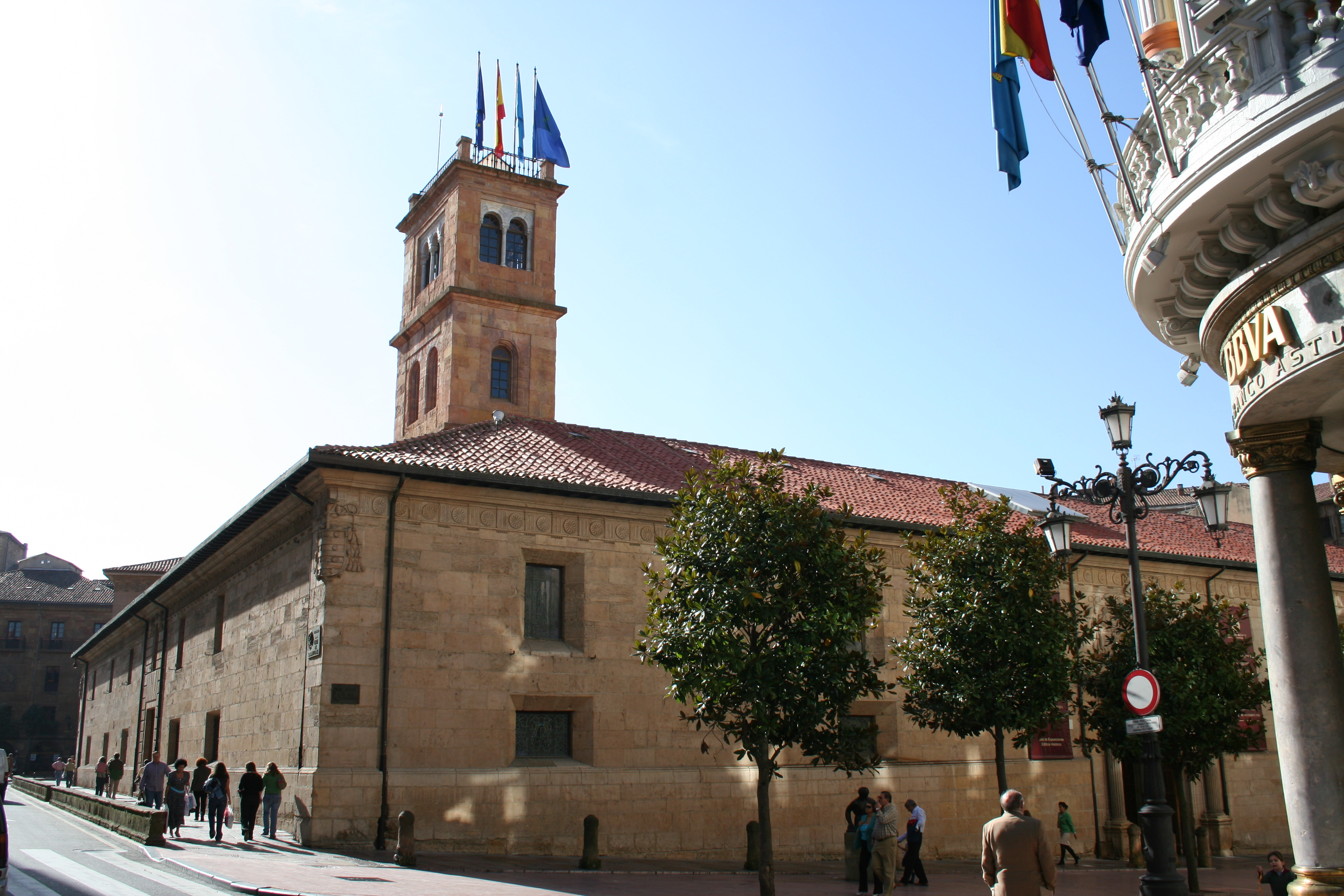
In 2015, University of Oviedo dedicated a course to Madonna, marking the first time a female artist was studied in the academy.

Outside the U.S., in the early 1990s, American editor Newitz stated that "Madonna occupies a definite place in the post-Western Cultures curriculum at universities everywhere". The University of Amsterdam created the elective academic discipline, Madonna: The Music and the Phenomenon, within the Department of Musicology. In Finland, Rossi Leena-Maija of Helsingin Sanomat reported in 1995 that Madonna had become part of the "Finnish academic life". In 2015, scholars at the University of Oviedo offered a Madonna course, marking the first time the university had devoted a course to a female singer.

=== Issues and approaches ===
The Madonna studies is an interdisciplinary field of cultural studies, as well media and communication studies. Professors Andy Bennett (Griffith University) and Steve Waksman (Smith College), in the book The Sage Handbook of Popular Music (2014) commented that the "Madonna studies itself took a variety of forms (and not all of these necessarily counted as cultural studies)". Anne Hull writing for Tampa Bay Times described the Madonna studies as a "highly specialized" field. Miklitsch called it a "mini-discipline".

The Madonna studies explored a broad range of academic discourses, on the basis of her work such as videos, films, videos and live performances. This usage was known as "texts" in the cultural studies as observed Margo Hammond from Tampa Bay Times. Cathy Schwichtenberg, a University of Georgia professor and editor of The Madonna Connection (1993), described the field as a "touchstone for theoretical discussions", and included issues such as morality, sexuality, gender relations, and gay politics to name a few. The scholarship has variously addressed other topics such as consumer culture, reception studies, globalization, and performance, as noted Antoni Pizà Prohens, authors of Encyclopedia of Women in Today's World, Volume 1 (2011), and Ricardo Baca.

Susan McClary described scholarly approaches to Madonna as stemming from an iconographic perspective. Meanwhile, author David Chaney wrote that academic writings on Madonna were "explicitly concerned with interpreting the fabrication and representational strategies in the star's persona". A review of Dissertation Abstracts International: The humanities and social sciences. A (2008), stated that the Madonna scholarship focused "solely" on identity politics through "formalist readings of cultural texts and their reception to explore the influence of the larger political economic, historical, and cultural contexts of capitalist society". On the other hand, professor Pamela Robertson Wojcik of University of Notre Dame observes that "media attention fuels academic discourse, which in turn fuels media discourse, and ultimately all becomes a part of 'Madonna'". In this context, Hull argues that everything became "data" to scholars.

=== Bibliography ===
According to Caroline von Lowtzow from Süddeutsche Zeitung, the first scholarly works on Madonna appeared in 1985, and the field experienced a publishing boom in the early 1990s. In Material Girls (1995), Suzanna Danuta Walters held these academic writings, "has produced at least one major academic text devoted to Madonna". According to professor Sheila Jeffreys there exists "a slew of scholarly books in postmodern language" about her.

University of Illinois Urbana-Champaign professor Jane Desmond has argued that "the relevant bibliography is vast" in the Madonna studies, citing works ranging from Cathy Schwichtenberg's The Madonna Connection to Lisa Frank and Paul Smith's Madonnarama both published in 1993. Another 1993 publication, Deconstructing Madonna (Fran Lloyd) situates Madonna within a British rather than an American cultural perspective. Scholars including Thomas Ferraro and Santiago Fouz-Hernández have identified additional foundational texts, such as Karlene Faith's Madonna, Bawdy & Soul (1997) and the works previously cited by Desmond. Fouz-Hernández describes The Madonna Connection arguably a "key event" in the history of the relationship between Madonna and the academy. Professor Pamela Robertson Wojcik has similarly argued that the three books published in 1993, "cemented the institutionalization of a major subdivision of American media studies into Madonna studies".

In addition, Weisbard noted that some of her bibliographies often combine music criticism with "academic chops" citing Madonna: Like an Icon (2007) by Lucy O'Brien as an example. Fouz-Hernández observed that academic discourses on Madonna were periodically amalgamated in volumes such as Desperately Seeking Madonna (Sexton, 1993), Madonna: The Rolling Stone Files (Rolling Stone, 1997) or The Madonna Companion (Metz and Benson, 1999)". Ferraro describes the latter book as "the better resource for Madonna criticism". Bitch She's Madonna (2018), written by Hispanic academics was promoted as the first Spanish–language cultural study book dedicated to Madonna, and as an extension of the Madonna studies in Spain. Assistant professor Manav Ratti of Salisbury University, writing for Journal of American Studies in 2018, discussed Madonna's Sex book and called it as an extension of "scholarship on Madonna".

== Madonna scholars ==
"Madonna scholars" and "Madonnologists" are the term commonly used to describe academics who study Madonna. One of the earliest academics to be referred to as a "Madonna scholar" was John Fiske. According to some publications, many of the Madonna scholars came from left-wing ideological perspectives, including LGBT-related political movements, radical antiracism and feminism perspectives.

Media outlets reported a growing interest from scholars in Madonna during the early 1990s, including Barbara Stewart of the Orlando Sentinel, among professors of English, anthropology, and communication studies. In the The Tampa Bay, Anne Hull reported an academic interest in Madonna by theologians, Marxists and sociologists. Author Carla Freccero referred to white academic feminists as "enacting the wannabe syndrome of Madonna fans" in the journal Feminism and Postmodernism. By contrast, American art historian Douglas Crimp remarked: "My hesitancy to participate in the Madonna studies phenomenon is that I generally think and write about things that really do matter to me, and Madonna doesn't matter to me that much".

Madonna scholars appeared on talk shows and were featured in national and international newspapers and magazines, according to Fouz-Hernández (2004). Schwichtenberg argued that "writing 'about' Madonna and her cultural significance had produced connections with others outside academe that dissolved the boundaries between public and private, academic and popular, theory and practice". By contrast, John Harris of the British music magazine Sounds criticized what he regarded as pseudo-intellectual rock analysis, cited Madonna, her small intellectual industry, and the scholars. He also referred to a BBC Omnibus special featuring some of these scholars, remarking that "the crap quotient went through the roof".

=== Criticisms ===
"Madonna has been drafted into the staggeringly implausible role of spokeswoman of the values and professional interests of university instructors."

— Daniel Harris, from The Nation (Make My Rainy Day- June 8, 1992).

Madonna scholars faced criticism from both academia and the mainstream media, with some describing them as a "marginal group". Ouellette traces the peak of this criticism to the publication of The Madonna Connection (1993), noting that such scholars became a fashionable target for "concern, condescension, and scorn from progressive quarters". Some authors suggested that the field was no really about Madonna, but was primarily motivated by professional factors within the academia, particularly a desire among scholars to "prove their social relevance". Ouellette argued that these scholars were not so much interested in Madonna herself, and Spanish sociologist Enrique Gil Calvo of the Complutense University of Madrid similarly stated "what scholars want is to take advantage of Madonna's fame".

Madonna scholars were subjected to discussions and criticisms centered on potential fanatic and ideological bias. Psychologist Abigail J. Stewart has questioned why some academics focus primarily on "Madonna's triumphs and not at her pain", further commenting that they have constructed Madonna as a "solo generator of her image", arguing the postmodernist approaches have contributed at least as much as her biographers to her self-generated myth. In contrast, Guilbert argues that some Madonnologists instead seek to appropriate Madonna's work to serve ideological purposes and criticize her for failing to promote specific causes.

One critic argued "these professors make Madonna the academic equivalent of Shakespeare". Anne Hull wrote: "A handful of renegade scholars—students and professors—are studying Madonna. While their colleagues explore gender conflicts in Florentine history or Aristotelian metaphysics, they search for higher meaning in Madonna". Harris also expressed that "her academic admirers spend a great deal of time studying how she embodies the fantasies of other people; they devote remarkably little time, however, to discussing how she embodies their own". In 2003, Stephen Brown from University of Ulster who studied Madonna as a marketing genius, commented that "when you read some of the stuff that academics have written about her, then you're inclined to conclude that certain scholars should get out more".

=== Views from Madonna scholars ===
Some Madonna scholars reacted to the controversies surrounding them. In 1993, Laurie Schulze of the University of Denver, interpreted they were target of gender bias in academia (various were female), arguing that some of the criticisms directed at the scholars resembled those aimed at Madonna herself. In a 1999 article published in The Velvet Light Trap, Schulze further examined the controversy and the label of the "Madonna's academic wannabes" by left-leaning popular press, as per her publication. E. Ann Kaplan, an early scholar of the scholarship, expressed surprise at the backlash and interpreted it as part of a broader reaction against feminism. Chip Wells, whose thesis received media attention, reacted to the criticisms from Inside Edition, which recorded him saying: "I've read Aristotle, Plato, Descartes. And I'm not finding anything in them I'm not finding in Madonna". He commented, "it's not hard to make us look dumb". Assistant professor Lisa Henderson, stated "one can be a fan and a scholar, they enhance each other".

== Reception ==
=== Point of controversy ===
"[...] the Minerva of modernity, Madonna Studies, is a sign of the times, a symptomatic figure not only of cultural studies in all its celebratory, cultural-populist excess but of a critical discourse responsive to postmodern culture in all its politically complext mutability"

— Robert Miklitsch, associate professor of English at Ohio University talking about "Madonna studies" (1997).

Described as a controversial field by the National Geographic Society in 2018, Spanish sociologist María Ángeles Durán has noted that Madonna has been the subject of numerous and diverse studies, but provoking controversy of opinions. Charles T. Banner-Haley, a professor of history at Colgate University, similarly observed that Madonna's influence in academia has "caused a division among scholars that has often gone from the sublime to the silly". David Roediger described: "The idea of studying the popularity of Madonna has been grist for the mills of many critics of trends in scholarship on American culture".

Criticisms to the field extended to journalists, as noted the Répertoire International de Littérature Musicale. In 1991, Knight Ridder published an article titled "Madonna Even Controversial for Scholars", where they cited commentaries made by teachers and media personalities. According to Miklitsch, for cultural critics, the Madonna studies represented "the first and last word of barbarism", for the left, and cultural for the right. He described the scholarship as "political-cultural" phenomenon. Other critics labeled these studies as "the ultimate act of cultural imperialism".

=== Criticisms ===
From educational perspectives, critics described such courses as a "a waste of time and money" for both professors and students. In 2000, the BBC News reported that the Madonna studies were cited among examples of degree courses that add little or nothing to students' employment prospects. In 2003, British author Emma Brockes referred that some of the most dubious sounding degree courses have come out of the best universities, including a Madonna-devoted course pioneered by Harvard in the early 1990s.

Critics described Madonna as "unworthy of academic study" and that she "adds nothing to the advancement of knowledge". Robert Walser referred that some students reacted skeptically to the studies on Madonna, because "they haven't thought about in certain ways" and "they've trained not to image that there could be anything important going in popular culture, especially in popular culture produced by women". In 1990, Roger Kimball referred to Madonna's presence in classrooms with nothing short of "defrauding students of a liberal-arts education".

Given the fact that Madonna's work only occupied consciousness for a mere years during the rise of this branch (she debuted in 1983), Elizabeth Tippens of Rolling Stone asked in 1990, "Do we wait another fifty years before we dare to deconstruct Madonna? To ask what she is teaching us about ourselves and our culture?". CBS News president Fred W. Friendly referred that "writing a major paper is supposed to be an intellectual achievement—a serious matter. Madonna is a media freak. How the media made her—I could see studying that". Camille Paglia, who devoted studies on Madonna, commented "we do not need a 'whole course' in Madonna". In late 1990s, Australian feminist historian Barbara Caine referred to the Madonna studies as dated, while Robert Clay, a University of Florida English professor called them an "Old Hat".

According to Ouellette, the Madonna studies also received criticisms because tends "to be jargon laden and prone to over-interpretation". Mandy Merck in Perversions: Deviant Readings (1993), added others opposed to these studies describing them as "a state of intellectual anarchy that sanctions willfully perverse misreadings". Paglia criticized its "pretentious terminology", and cited terms such as "intertextual", "significations", "transgressive", "subversive" or "self-representation". She argued that "this would be comical, except for its ill effect on students and an increasingly corrupt career system". Robert Christgau observed that much academic writing on Madonna "feels translated", noting also a tendency to "overanalyze" and "overstuff" her music videos in contrast to her pop songs. The authors of Media and Cultural Theory (2010), stated that, from a musicological perspective, Madonna studies devoted little attention to musical texts, and instead focused on performance and music videos. Author Andrew Blake offers a musicological review, nothing broadly that cultural studies have a "problem" with music itself.

=== Responses ===
Some publications and scholars, particularly those working in the Madonna studies, offered their responses. Charles Sykes from Milwaukee Magazine stated "there's no subject too ridiculous to be a subject of research in academics". Theodore Clevenger, dean of FSU's Department of Communication, referred "This type of research is routine [...] From an academic point of view, it doesn't seem peculiar to me".In Feeling Italian: The Art of Ethnicity in America (2005), Thomas Ferraro described the field as "quite academic in focus, language, and ideology".

Historian Marilyn B. Young commented that "pop culture has long been studied in universities" and "Madonna's impact is serious". Jesse Nash, an anthropology professor at Loyola University, suggested that a figure like Madonna is "key to understanding the times in which they live and, by contrast, other eras", adding also that a whole generation were forming "opinions based on her". Schwichtenberg justified studies on Madonna, saying that she is a figure important to "subcultural groups". According to Orlando Sentinel, some regarded her as "worthy of inquiry [today] as Charles Dickens was in the 18th century". Lisa Henderson, an assistant professor claimed that "a dissertation on Shakespeare might have been as laughable 300 years ago as a dissertation on Madonna might be today". In their views, Gary Burns and Elizabeth Kizer, in Madonna: Like a Dichotomy (1990) commented that students in communications classes find "useful to study Madonna" because she is "a fascinating and prolific cultural figure". In his Madonna devoted class, economist Robert M. Grant referred to the familiarity with Madonna that make possible "for everyone to contribute to the discussion". On the other hand, in 1993, Ouellette suggested if critics had not been "so hostile from the start", they might have been fairer in noting that essays collected for instance, in The Madonna Connection, were "nowhere near uniform celebrations of Madonna as a feminist or even populist idol".

=== Madonna's thoughts ===
In 1994, Jon Pareles of The New York Times asked Madonna's thoughts about the academic discipline, while she responded, "I laugh. It's amusing. It's flattering because obviously I'm on a lot of people's minds. But I read about all of these things, and I read what I meant by things, and I just think, all of this comes from my subconscious or my unconscious, I don't even think about it". In an interview with Vanity Fair according to Gary Goshgarian, she gave a similar answer: "It's flattering to me that people take the time to analyze me and that I've so infiltrated their psyches that they have to intellectualize my very being. I'd rather be on their minds than off".

== Impact ==
=== Comparisons and influence ===
According to associate professor Diane Pecknold, Madonna studies "heralded and hastened the development of American cultural studies". Dutch media scholar Jaap Kooijman, commented that before the Madonna studies, "most scholarly attention was paid to genres and artists that were not considered 'pop'", but she brought pop to the foreground. In The Cut (2023), Brandon Sanchez also attributed an impact to the Madonna studies.

The Madonna studies were also used as a point of reference for comparison or critique of other academic trends and courses. Danish professor Erik Steinskog, used the field to defend the courses proposed for Beyoncé. Michael Dango compared the Madonna-ology with the ongoing courses of Taylor Swift in 2024. Historian professor David Roediger, noticed that in 1997, The New York Times Magazine ridiculed the whiteness studies calling it as the "silly successor" of the porn studies and Madonna studies.

According to American writer Julia Keller: "Madonna Studies 101 [is the] derisive nickname sometimes applied to cultural studies". In the early 2000s, Michael Bérubé commented "as long as cultural studies is taken to be identical to Madonna Studies, the critiques of cultural studies follow an altogether predictable path". Bérubé continued to be critical of the cultural studies more broadly, writing for The Chronicle of Higher Education in 2009, that since it importation from Europe to the United States, the field "has basically turned into a branch of pop-culture criticism". Stuart Hall, one of the most prominent authors in the cultural studies, commented: "I really cannot read another cultural-studies analysis of Madonna or The Sopranos".

Broadly, in Vamps & Tramps: New Essays (2011), Paglia referred to the "current academic writing on Madonna" and also on American popular culture in general as "deplorably low quality". It is marked by "inaccuracy, bathos, overinterpretation, overpoliticization and grotesquely inappropriate jargon borrowed from pseudotechnical semiotics and moribund French theory". Authors in Evaluating Creativity: Making and Learning by Young People (2000), commented that "whatever one's position on the Madonna debate, she stands as an image for a more general anxiety in the study of culture, and this respect the overall effect of postmodernism has been to unsettle criteria for evaluation in the arts in two ways: the neo-conservative backlash and cultural relativism".

=== On Madonna ===
The scholarship also made an impact on Madonna's literature. Daniel Harris of The Nation described as early as 1992 that "there is a Madonna for virtually every theoretical stripe". Commentators like Colombian writer José Yunis, El País's Lola Galán, Chilean literary critic Óscar Contardo and Caroline von Lowtzow from Süddeutsche Zeitung made similar observations. The lattermost adding that this even prompted a parody of these multiple interpretations: a "Postmodernism Generator".

According to the Encyclopedia of Women in Today's World (2011) the studies heralded Madonna as a "symbol, image, and brand". Authors of Religion and Popular Culture: Rescripting the Sacred (2008), believes that despite the mocking of the Madonna studies wave, "the period produced some important and groundbreaking work in cultural studies that focused on the music, videos [and] films" of her career. In Boricua Pop (2004), Frances Negrón-Muntaner reflected: "Imagine for a second that you are Madonna... Imagine, that there are theory books about you, and that you are the main theme of dissertations and academic essays. Imagine that feminists discuss whether you are a heroine or a demon".

==== Scrutiny ====
"With Madonna, the extensive tie-in between media scholars [...] has produced an exaggerated metacritical level."

— The Madonna Connection (1993)

The wealth of academic scrutiny of Madonna was remarked by commentators, including authors in Gender and Popular Culture (2013). Author David Chaney described it as an "enormous academic and popular literature of explanation and comment", while José F. Blanco described Madonna as "overexposed in academic research" for The Journal of Popular Culture in 2015. Others, including Australian historians Robert Aldrich and Garry Wotherspoon called Madonna a "performer of inimitable ubiquity" as she "has saturated the pages of academic journals" in the 1990s. Alina Simone, author of Madonnaland (2016), commented while she was working in her book: "I maintained hope of finding some tiny stone left unturned in the giant gravel pit of Madonna studies", but she encountered "there is no dearth of material about Madonna, but an overwhelming excess". Broadly, professor Santiago Fouz-Hernández, author of Madonna's Drowned Worlds (2004), argues that the abundance of critical work on Madonna reflects broader methodological developments and trends in academia, noting that the study of popular culture evolved significantly since David Riesman described it in 1960 as "a relatively new field in American social science".

In Madonna: A Biography (2007), Mary Cross described Madonna as an "exalted star on the unlikely stage of academia". In the early 1990s, educator David Buckingham referred to it as "a meteoric rise to academic canonisation". Professor Gregory Ulmer of the University of Florida labeled her as "the most studied pop figure in universities". Elizabeth Tippens from Rolling Stone commented in 1992, that "no female pop-music figure has ever infiltrated the halls of academia as Madonna has". Andreas Häger from Åbo Akademi University citing Schwichtenberg notes: "Hardly any other popular artist has received as much attention from the scientific community as Madonna".

In Materialisations of a Woman Writer (2006), Swedish author Maria Wikse from Stockholm University commented "Madonna is no longer in the academic limelight", but stated that "Madonna Studies remains an established field within Cultural Studies". Andrew Morton wrote in his book Madonna of 2001: "All those college lecturers endlessly debating her impact on racial and gender relations in post-modern society, are still, after twenty years, desperately seeking Madonna".

Other authors detailed that theories about Madonna subsided at the turn of the 21st century, with Caroline von Lowtzow suggesting in 2008, "a degree of saturation seems to have been reached". In this regard, Loughborough University's Jim McGuigan described that in the cultural studies the case of Madonna was so "overworked" that it has reached tedium, as happened in old schools with the historical problem on the Causes of World War I. According to investigative journalist Ethan Brown in 2000, the Madonna studies "has obscured what made its subject so appealing in the first place (Madonna)" and blamed Camilla Paglia to university semiotics departments.

== See also ==
- Bibliography of works on Madonna
- Academese
- Academic writing

== Book sources ==
- Chaney, David (2002). The Cultural Turn: Scene Setting Essays on Contemporary Cultural History. Routledge. ISBN 1134850891.
- Church Gibson, Pamela (2013). Fashion and Celebrity Culture. Berg. ISBN 978-0857852311.
- Forbes, Bruce David (2005). Religion and Popular Culture in America. University of California Press. ISBN 0520246896.
- Negrón-Muntaner, Frances (2004). Boricua Pop: Puerto Ricans and the Latinization of American Culture. New York University Press. ISBN 978-0-8147-5818-2.
- Goshgarian, Gary (1993). The Contemporary Reader. HarperCollins. ISBN 0673522229.
- Hall, Dennis R.; Hall, Susan G. (2006). American Icons. Greenwood Publishing Group. ISBN 0313027676.
- Jeffreys, Sheila (2005). Beauty and Misogyny: Harmful Cultural Practices in the West. Routledge. ISBN 1134264437.
- Roediger, David R. (2010). Black on White: Black Writers on What It Means to Be White. Knopf Doubleday Publishing Group. ISBN 978-0307482297.
