= Piza =

Piza may refer to:

- Antoni Pizà (born 1962), Spanish musicologist
- Evaristo Piza (born 1972), Brazilian footballer and coach
- Luz María Pizá Núñez (born 1950), Mexican painter
- Rodolfo Piza Rocafort (born 1958), Costa Rican politician and lawyer
- Piza Michinoku, Japanese wrestler

== See also ==
- Pisa, a city in Tuscany, Italy
- Pizza, a food of Italian origin
