= Elizabeth Grosz =

Australian feminist theorist (born 1952)

- Born: Elizabeth Anne Grosz; 1952 (age 73–74)
- Awards: Gleebooks Prize for Critical Writing (1995)

Education
- Education: University of Sydney (BA; PhD, 1980)
- Thesis: Psychoanalysis and social construction of subjectivity (1980)

Philosophical work
- Era: Contemporary philosophy
- Region: Western philosophy
- School: Continental philosophy, feminist philosophy
- Institutions: Duke University
- Main interests: Feminist philosophy, psychoanalytic theory, deconstruction, philosophy of art, the philosophy of Gilles Deleuze, Darwinism and sexual selection
- Notable works: Volatile Bodies (1994)

Elizabeth Anne Grosz (/ɡroʊs/; born 1952) is an Australian philosopher, feminist theorist, and professor working in the U.S. She is Jean Fox O'Barr Women's Studies Distinguished Professor Emerita at Duke University in Durham, North Carolina, U.S.

== Early life and education ==
Elizabeth A. Grosz was born in 1952 in Sydney, Australia.

She studied for a Bachelor of Arts (Hons) degree at the University of Sydney, where in 1980, she received her PhD from the Department of General Philosophy.

== Career ==
Grosz lectured at the Department of General Philosophy at the University of Sydney from 1978 to 1991. She moved to Monash University in 1992 as director of the newly created Institute of Critical and Cultural Studies, where she was also associate professor and professor in critical theory and philosophy.

During the 1980s and 1990s she was visiting professor at University of California, Santa Cruz, University of California, Davis, Johns Hopkins University, the University of Richmond, George Washington University, and the University of California, Irvine.

From 1999 to 2001, she was professor of Comparative Literature and English at the State University of New York at Buffalo. She taught at Rutgers University in the Department of Women's and Gender Studies from 2002 until becoming professor of Women's Studies and Literature at Duke University in Durham, North Carolina in 2012.

Since 2019 and as of February 2024 Grosz is Jean Fox O'Barr Women's Studies Distinguished Professor Emerita and Professor Emerita of Program in Gender, Sexuality and Feminist Studies at Duke University.

== Writing ==
Grosz has written on 20th-century French philosophers Jacques Lacan, Jacques Derrida, Michel Foucault, Luce Irigaray and Gilles Deleuze, as well as on gender, sexuality, temporality, and Darwinian evolutionary theory.

Her works include:

- Sexual Subversions: Three French Feminists (1989)
- Jacques Lacan: A Feminist Introduction (1990)
- Volatile Bodies: Toward a Corporeal Feminism (1994)
- Space, Time and Perversion: Essays on the Politics of Bodies (1995)
- Architecture from the Outside: Essays on Virtual and Real Space (2001)
- The Nick of Time: Politics, evolution, and the untimely (2004)
- Time Travels: Feminism, nature, power (2005)
- Chaos, Territory, Art: Deleuze and the Framing of the Earth (2008)
- Becoming Undone: Darwinian Reflections on Life, Politics and Art (2011)
- The Incorporeal: Ontology, Ethics, and the Limits of Materialism (2017)
