= Fjellestad =

Fjellestad is a surname. Notable people with the surname include:

- Danuta Fjellestad (born 1952), Swedish professor of American Literary studies
- Hans Fjellestad (born 1968), American pianist, music composer and documentary filmmaker
