= Signs (journal) =

Feminist academic journal

- Discipline: Women's studies, Feminist theory, Queer theory, Gender studies
- Language: English
- Edited by: Suzanna Danuta Walters

Publication details
- History: 1975–present
- Publisher: University of Chicago Press (United States)
- Frequency: Quarterly
- Impact factor: 1.9 (2022)

Standard abbreviations
- Bluebook: Signs
- ISO 4: Signs

Indexing
- ISSN: 0097-9740 (print); 1545-6943 (web)
- LCCN: 75649469
- JSTOR: 00979740
- OCLC no.: 223703061

Links
- Journal homepage; Online access; Online archive

Signs: Journal of Women in Culture and Society is a peer-reviewed feminist academic journal. It was established in 1975 by Jean W. Sacks, Head of the Journals Division, with Catharine R. Stimpson as its first editor-in-Chief, and is published quarterly by the University of Chicago Press. Signs publishes essays examining the lives of women, men, and non-binary people around the globe from both historical and contemporary perspectives, as well as theoretical and critical articles addressing processes of gendering, sexualization, and racialization.

== History and significance ==
The founding of Signs in 1975 was part of the early development of the field of women's studies, born of the women's liberation movement of the late 1960s and 1970s. The journal had two founding purposes, as stated in the inaugural editorial: (1) "to publish the new scholarship about women" in the U.S. and around the globe, and (2) "to be interdisciplinary." The goal was for readers of the journal to "grasp a sense of the totality of women's lives and the realities of which they have been a part." The meaning behind the name Signs is that signs "represent" and "point": the original editors wanted the journal to "represent the originality and rigor" of women's studies and to "point" to new directions for feminist scholarship.

Former editor-in-chief Ruth-Ellen Boetcher Joeres said in an article in the Yale Journal of Criticism that Signs, from its inception, was meant to be "something different, even insurgent... an agent for change," because it emerged from the "grassroots" feminist movement. Joeres explored the "paradox" of how a journal can be both an "agent for change" and regarded as "respectable in the academy," and concluded with the hope that Signs could retain its activist roots and transform the academy.

In the effort to avoid the tendency of the academy to "codify" and limit scholarship, Signs rotates institutional homes roughly every five years. It is currently based at Northeastern University, with Suzanna Danuta Walters, Director of Women's, Gender, and Sexuality Studies and Professor of Sociology, serving as editor-in-chief. In her inaugural editorial, Walters laid out five "core concerns" for Signs: (1) for the field of women's studies to "substantively reckon" with gender and sexuality studies and queer studies; (2) to focus on "racial and ethnic difference"; (3) to re-emphasize "inter- or transdisciplinarity"; (4) to not lose sight of "the big questions about gender and sexuality" by getting too narrow in scope; and (5) to expand the journal's "digital presence."

The history of Signs is explored extensively in Kelly Coogan-Gehr's 2011 book The Geopolitics of the Cold War and Narratives of Inclusion: Excavating a Feminist Archive. Coogan-Gehr uses Signs as a case study to complicate what she calls the "stock narrative of feminist field formation". She argues that dominant histories of the development of academic feminism, in focusing solely on the women's movement and other radical movements of the 1960s, fail to take into account the role of "changes the Cold War produced in higher education." In the book, she calls Signs a "premier academic feminist journal".

== Feminist Public Intellectuals Project (FPIP) ==
In 2015, Signs launched the Feminist Public Intellectuals Project, which seeks to engage feminist theorizing with pressing political and social problems via three open-access, online-first initiatives: Short Takes: Provocations on Public Feminism, Currents: Feminist Key Concepts and Controversies, and Ask a Feminist. Given the fragmentation of feminist activism and the persistent negative freighting of the term "feminist", the Feminist Public Intellectuals Project seeks to reimagine what role a journal can play in provoking activism.

Short Takes features commentaries by feminist activists and public intellectuals on recent books that "have shaped popular conversations about feminist issues," alongside a response by the author. Featured books include Roxane Gay's Bad Feminist, Rebecca Traister's All the Single Ladies, and Andi Zeisler's We Were Feminists Once.

Currents publishes essays that put forth "a nuanced and edgy take on a key issue circulating in the feminist definitional landscape." Issues addressed include "identity politics", "trigger warnings", "celebrity feminism", and "affirmative consent".

Ask a Feminist is an interview series that seeks to create "conversation between and among feminist scholars, media activists, and community leaders," to bridge the divide between scholarship and activism. Recent features include "Angela P. Harris on Gender and Gun Violence" and "Cathy J. Cohen on Black Lives Matter, Feminism, and Contemporary Activism".

== Catharine R. Stimpson Prize ==
Signs awards the Catharine R. Stimpson Prize for Outstanding Feminist Scholarship, named for the founding editor-in-chief of Signs, biennially to the best paper from an international competition of "emerging" feminist scholars (meaning "fewer than seven years since receipt of the terminal degree"). The submissions are judged by an international jury of prominent feminist academics. Winners of the award include Czech historian Anna Hájková. Winners receive a $1,000 honorarium and have their papers published in Signs.

The 2017 co-winners of the Stimpson Prize were Cameron Awkward-Rich, for his essay "Trans, Feminism: Or, Reading like a Depressed Transsexual", and Meghan Healy-Clancy, for her essay "The Family Politics of the Federation of South African Women: A History of Public Motherhood in Women's Antiracist Activism".

== Editors-in-chief, emeritae and current ==
- Catharine R. Stimpson (Barnard College), founding editor-in-chief, 1975-1980
- Barbara C. Gelpi (Stanford University), 1980-1985
- Jean Fox O'Barr (Duke University), 1985-1990
- Ruth-Ellen Boetcher Joeres and Barbara Laslett (University of Minnesota), 1990-1995
- Carolyn Allen and Judith A. Howard (University of Washington), 1995-2000
- Sandra Harding and Kathryn Norberg (University of California, Los Angeles), 2000-2005
- Mary Hawkesworth (Rutgers University), 2005-2015
- Suzanna Danuta Walters (Northeastern University), 2015–present

== Notable contributors to Signs ==
- Lila Abu-Lughod
- Sara Ahmed
- Raewyn Connell
- Kimberlé Crenshaw
- Audre Lorde
- Catharine MacKinnon
- Chandra Talpade Mohanty
- Adrienne Rich
- Joan Wallach Scott
- Elaine Showalter
- Rajeswari Sunder Rajan
- Patricia J. Williams
- Iris Marion Young

== Abstracting and indexing ==
The journal is abstracted and indexed in:

- Academic Search Premier
- Arts and Humanities Citation Index
- ASSIA: Applied Social Sciences Index and Abstracts
- Contemporary Women's Issues
- MLA Bibliography
- PsycINFO
- Sociological Abstracts
- VioLit
- Women's Studies International

According to the Journal Citation Reports, the journal had a 2017 impact factor of 1.078, ranking it 16th out of 42 journals in the category "Women's Studies." In 2022, the journal's impact factor rose to 1.9, which placed it 14th among 64 "Women's Studies" journals. As of May 2024, its five-year impact factor was 2.8.

== See also ==
- Cultural studies
- Feminist theory
- Queer theory
- Gender studies
- Women's studies
- List of women's studies journals
- Feminist Studies (journal)
- Feminist Review
- Frontiers (journal)
