= Virginia R. Domínguez =

American anthropologist

- Born: Virginia R. Domínguez; 1952; USA
- Education: Yale University (BA, MA, PhD)
- Scientific career
- Fields: Anthropology, Africana studies, African American Studies
- Workplaces: University of Illinois at Urbana–Champaign

Virginia Dominguez (born 1952) is a political and legal anthropologist. She is currently the Edward William and Jane Marr Gutgsell Professor of Anthropology at the University of Illinois at Urbana-Champaign.

== Early life ==
Virginia Dominguez was born in Havana, Cuba in 1952. After her family left Cuba in 1960, Dominguez attended elementary and middle school in New York; San Juan, Puerto Rico; Bergen County, New Jersey and high school in Montevideo, Uruguay. Her family's moves were connected to her father's work in international business. After graduating from high school in 1968 and prior to beginning college in 1969, she lived with her parents in Guadalajara, Mexico. In 1969, Dominguez was among the 230 women who entered Yale University as freshmen and members of Yale's first co-ed class. During college, Dominguez's parents lived in Beirut, Lebanon, where she joined them on breaks. Anthropologist Sidney Mintz played an important role in the development of Dominguez's intellectual interests as an undergraduate at Yale. She graduated from Yale with a B.A. (summa cum laude and Phi Beta Kappa) in 1973.

== Scholarship ==
Dominguez has written on race, social classification, identity, law, evidence and epistemology, and global and transnational processes. White by Definition is based on her dissertation research, and deals with race, identity and social classification in Creole Louisiana. In the 1980s, Dominguez began conducting research on issues surrounding Jewish-ness, identity, and classification in Israel. She published People as Subject, People as Object: Selfhood and Peoplehood in Contemporary Israel in 1989. In addition to her continued writing on race, identity and social categories, many of Dominguez's recent writings have demonstrated a concern with questions of evidence and epistemology in the field of anthropology and beyond.

== Career ==
Dominguez completed her M.Phil. (1975) and Ph.D. (1979) at Yale. From 1976 to ‘79 she was a Junior Fellow at Harvard. After finishing her Doctorate, she taught in the Department of Anthropology at Duke University from 1979 to ‘91. She also taught at the Hebrew University of Jerusalem from 1984 to ‘85. After leaving Duke, Dominguez taught at the University of California, Santa Cruz from 1991 to ‘93, the University of Iowa from 1993 to 2006, as well as at Eotvos Lorand University in Budapest in spring 2001. In 2007 she moved to the University of Illinois Urbana-Champaign, where she is currently the Edward William and Jane Marr Gutgsell Professor of Anthropology, as well as a member of the Jewish Studies, Middle Eastern Studies, and Caribbean Studies faculty. Dominguez has also been Directeur d'Etudes at the Ecole des Hautes Etudes en Sciences Sociales in Paris, a Simon Professor at the University of Manchester, and a Research Fellow at the East–West Center in Honolulu.

Dominguez has been awarded grants for her individual scholarship and collaborative projects by the Social Science Research Council (1981–1982); the Mellon Foundation; Fulbright (1984–1985); the Ford Foundation (1995–1998); the Rockefeller Foundation (2001; 1995–1999); and the U.S. Department of Education (1997–2001). In 1995, she was invited to give the prestigious Lewis Henry Morgan Lectures at the University of Rochester. She is author or editor of ten books and monographs, editor of twenty issues of the journal American Ethnologist, and author of ninety-five academic articles and book chapters.

Dominguez is Co-Founder, with Dr. Jane Desmond, of the International Forum for U.S. Studies (established in 1995), and Co-Editor of its book series, "Global Studies of the United States." She served as the Editor of American Ethnologist from 2002 to 2007, and has served on the Editorial Boards of twelve other academic journals. Dominguez was President of the American Anthropological Association from 2009 to 2011.

While AAA President, Dominguez ran a series of podcasts entitled “Inside the President’s Studio,” in which she interviewed anthropologists from across the field's diverse sub-fields and across the globe. Dominguez lead an effort to found Antropologos sem Fronteiras (Anthropologists without Borders), and in 2013 succeeded, in collaboration with the World Council of Anthropological Associations in her role as elected Chair of the council, to legally establish the organization in Brazil.

In 2022, Dominguez was awarded the Wilbur Cross Medal by the Yale Graduate School of Arts & Sciences as a distinguished alumnus.

== Selected publications ==
=== Books ===
- 1975 From Neighbor to Stranger: The Dilemma of Caribbean Peoples in the United States. New Haven: Antilles Research Program at Yale.
- 1981 The Caribbean and Its Implications for the United States. Co-authored with Jorge I. Dominguez. New York: Foreign Policy Association, Headline Series.
- 1986 White by Definition: Social Classification in Creole Louisiana. New Brunswick: Rutgers University Press. (1994—new paperback edition).
- 1987 Special Annual Issue of Cuban Studies on "Sex, Gender, and Revolution in Cuba." Guest coeditor, with Yolanda Prieto.
- 1989 People as Subject, People as Object: Selfhood and Peoplehood in Contemporary Israel. Madison: The University of Wisconsin Press.
- 1995 Special Issue of Identities on "(Multi)Culturalisms and the Baggage of 'Race'" (Guest Editor).
- 1995 Questioning Otherness: An Interdisciplinary Exchange. Iowa International Papers, Occasional Papers 30–37 (153 pages). Co-edited with Catherine M. Lewis.
- 1997 Evaluating Human Genetic Diversity. Washington, D.C.: National Academy Press. 91 pages. Co-author as member of 17 person Committee on Human Genome Diversity (of the National Research Council, U.S. National Academy of Sciences). Significant co-author, especially of Chapter 5 ("Human Rights and Human-Genetic Variation Research,” pp. 55–68).
- 1998 From Beijing to Port Moresby: The Politics of National Identity in Cultural Policies (edited with David Wu) NY: Gordon and Breach. Volume I, No. 4.

=== Articles ===
- 1977 "Social Classification in Creole Louisiana," American Ethnologist 4 (4): 589–602.
- 1984 "The Language of Left and Right in Israeli Politics,” Political Anthropology 4: 89–109.
- 1986 “The Marketing of Heritage,” American Ethnologist 13 (3):546–555. Invited Review Article.
- 1990 "Representing Value and the Value of Representation: A Different Look at Money," Cultural Anthropology 5 (1):16–44.
- 1992 "Invoking Culture: The Messy Side of 'Cultural Politics'," SAQ (The South Atlantic Quarterly) 91:1.
- 1993 "A Taste for 'the Other': Intellectual Complicity in Racializing Practices,"Current Anthropology 35(4):333–348.
- 1995 "Invoking Racism in the Public Sphere," Identities: Global Studies in Culture and Power I (4): 325–346.
- 1996 "Resituating American Studies in a Critical Internationalism," American Quarterly 48 (Sept.):475–490. Co-authored with Jane C. Desmond.
- 1996 "Disciplining Anthropology." In Disciplinarity and Dissent in Cultural Studies. Cary Nelson and Dilip Gaonkar, eds. pp. 37–61. New York: Routledge.
- 1998 "Exporting U.S. Concepts of Race: Are There Limits to the U.S. Model?” Social Research 65(2):369–399 (summer).
- 1998 “Asserting (Trans)Nationalism and the Social Conditions of Its Possibility,” Communal/Plural: Journal of Transnational and Crosscultural Studies (Australia) 6(2):139–156.
- 1998 “Conversation about Global Equality and Affirmation Action,” Washington University Law Review 75(4).
- 2000 "For a Politics of Love and Rescue," Cultural Anthropology 15(3):361–393 (Aug.)
- 2001 "UnAmerican Americans? Stretching the Boundaries of American Studies." In Rediscovering America: American Studies in the New Century. Kousar Azam, ed. pp. 120–134. New Delhi: South Asian Publishers.
- 2005 "Seeing and Not Seeing: Complicity in Surprise," SSRC Social Science Research Council Web Forum : "Understanding Katrina: Perspectives from the Social Sciences,” http://understandingkatrina.ssrc.org/
- 2007 “When the Enemy is Unclear: US Censuses and Photographs of Cuba, Puerto Rico, and the Philippines from the Beginning of the 20th Century,” Comparative American Studies (a U.K.-based international journal published by Sage Publications) 5(2):173–203.
- 2007 “Nemi poco chiari, amici poco chiari” (“Unclear Enemies, Unclear Friends”), Acoma: Rivista Internazionale di Studi Nordamericani (The International Journal of American Studies) 33:53–65 (original written in English and translated into Italian for publication).
- 2008 “When Belonging Inspires – Death, Hope Distance,” (Review Essay) Identities: Global Studies in Culture and Power 15(3):369–389.
- 2009 “Evidence and Power, Sweet and Sour.” In Empirical Futures: Critical Engagements with the Work of Sidney W. Mintz, Stephan Palmie, Aisha Khan, and George Baca, eds. Chapel Hill: University of North Carolina Press.
- 2009/10 “Wiggle Room and Writing,” Iowa Journal for Cultural Studies.
- 2012 "Comfort Zones and their Dangers: Who are We? Qui Sommes-Nous?” The 2011 AAA Presidential Address. American Anthropologist (Sept. issue).
- 2012 “Unexpected Ties: Insight. Love, Exhaustion.” ---as part of an edited book conceived by, and submitted in summer 2010 by, Alma Gottlieb and titled The Restless Anthropologist: New Fieldsites, New Visions. Chicago: University of Chicago Press.
- 2013 “Falling in Love with a Criminal? On Immersion and Self-Restraint.” Invited and chosen for, a book titled Ethnographic Encounters in Israel: Poetics and Ethics of Fieldwork in Israel, edited by Fran Markowitz. Bloomington, Indiana: Indiana University Press.
