= E. Ann Kaplan =

American professor, author, and director

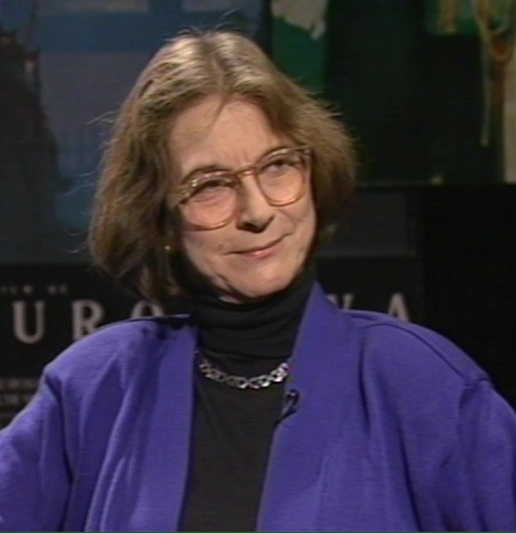
Kaplan on CUNY TV's Cinema Then, Cinema Now, 1991

E. Ann Kaplan is an American professor, author, and director. She currently teaches English at the Stony Brook State University of New York, and is the founder and director of The Humanities Institute at Stony Brook University. She coined the term future-tense trauma cinema for a subset of science fiction films that focus on human and natural causes of complete social collapse instead of displacing cultural anxieties into allegories. She is also one of the pioneers of the Madonna studies.

== Life ==
In 1958, Kaplan graduated from the University of Birmingham in England, in which she gained an English Language and Literature degree with Honours. In 1959, she finished her Postgraduate studies with a Diploma in English from the University of London; followed by obtaining her Ph.D. in Comparative Literature at Rutgers University, United States, writing about the topic of "Hawthorne and Romanticism: A Study of Hawthorne in the Context of the American and European Romantic Movements."in 1970. She currently is a distinguished professor of English and cultural Analysis and Theory as well as founding director of the Humanities Institute at Stony Brook University, established in 1987 to promote interdisciplinary research and cross-university collaboration. She is the past president of The Society for Cinema and Media Studies as well as a member of the Executive Modern Language Association discussion on Age Studies. Her research fields include Women's and Gender studies, Feminist film theory, Film Noir, Popular Culture and Postmodernism as well as Postcolonialism in film and media. Her latest research focused on Trauma- and Age Studies. Over the course of her career, she has published eight monographs, edited and co-edited fifteen anthologies as well as published over forty articles in academic journals. Her books have been translated into seven languages. Her research on women in film (a.o. Women in film: Both sides of the Camera, Women in Film Noir) are still in print. She is currently working on two future book projects, Future-Sense Trauma: Dystopian Imaginaries on Screen and The Unconscious of Age: Screening Older Women, with essays already written in 2010 and 2011, thus preceding the books. Her new book dealing with Future-Sense Trauma Cinema builds upon her earlier trauma research, with her contributions first lying in going back to the genre of Dystopia directly after the 9/11 attacks on the World Trade Center. Another contribution of her is the creation of new sub-criteria of the already existing Sci-Fi genre relevant to the current era in which terrorism is a constant threat.

== Future-tense trauma cinema ==
Animated by the spread of dystopian futurist imaginaries in a wide array of media outlets, in her case mostly in film, her book aims to analyze dystopian fantasies partially as "displacements from the past and present" as well as shapings of the future which then ultimately shape the present and past. Kaplan coined the term future-tense trauma cinema to describe a subgenre of science fiction which targets the human and natural causes of entire social disintegration, instead of more usual science fiction, forcing out "cultural anxieties" into symbolizations of aliens attacking the Earth from outer space. According to Kaplan, the elected movies can be broadly put into two tiers, namely "futurist dystopian political thriller" (e.g., Children of Men [2006]) and "post-traumatic futurist disaster film" (e.g.The Road [2009]).

Both of these subgenres have its images and arrangements, all relating back in many different courses to the utopian/dystopian swaying Kaplan shows to be influencing to the genre. The book shows the convoluted interaction of three levels of debates which in turn collectively focus the scope onto the cultural effort which futurist imaginaries put in. The first of which is the imagination of destroyed worlds on a social, political, and natural level, linked with the problem of how human interference with nature has dramatically altered it through man-made global warming; second, the contradiction between the delicate hope most of the genre movies endings and the obvious frailty of said hope; third, the scientific discourse reaching beyond the fictitious movies which claim that the human interference with the ecosystem have reached a point of no return.

== Awards ==
E. Ann Kaplan has received the following awards. The SUNY Chancellor's Award for Outstanding Scholarship and Creativity (2001), the Stony Brook Faculty Achievement Award (2004), the Distinguished Alumnae Award, Rutgers University (2005), the Distinguished Career Award, Society for Cinema and Media Studies (2009), and in 2012. She received an Honorary Degree from Josai International University, Tokyo, Japan, awarded in 2010.

Kaplan introduced the concept of imperial gaze, in which the observed find themselves defined in terms of the privileged observer's own set of value-preferences.

== Bibliography ==
- Women in Film: Both Sides of the Camera (1983)
- Rocking Around the Clock: Music Television, Post Modernism and Consumer Culture (1987)
- Postmodernism and Its Discontents: Theories, Practices (1988)
- Women in Film Noir Looking for the Other: Feminism
- Motherhood and Representation (1992)
- Looking for the Other : Feminism, Film and the Imperial Gaze (1997)
- Feminism and Film (2000)
- Trauma and Cinema: Cross-Cultural Explorations (co-edited with Ban Wang, 2004)
- Trauma Culture: The Politics of Terror and Loss in Media and Literature (2005)
- Trauma and Cinema - Cross-Cultural Explorations (2010)
- Climate Trauma: Foreseeing the Future in Dystopian Film and Fiction (2015)

== See also ==
- Male gaze
