= Mary Hawkesworth =

American political scientist (born 1952)

Mary Hawkesworth (born June 26, 1952) is Distinguished Professor of Political Science and Women's and Gender Studies at Rutgers University in New Jersey. She is a political scientist trained in feminist theory and has conducted extensive research in women and politics, gender, and contemporary feminist activism. Hawkesworth was previously the Editor-in-Chief of Signs: Journal of Women in Culture and Society, an internationally recognized journal in feminist scholarship.

== Selected publications ==
=== Books ===
- Gender and Political Theory: Feminist Reckonings, Polity Press, 2019.
- Globalization and Feminist Activism, 2nd Edition, Rowman and Littlefield, 2018.
- The Douglass Century: The Transformation of Women's Education at Rutgers, Rutgers University Press, 2018. (Co-authored with Kayo Denda and Fernanda Perrone).
- Embodied Power: Demystifying Disembodied Politics, Routledge, 2016.
- Political Worlds of Women: Activism, Advocacy, and Governance in the 21st Century, Westview, 2012.
- Globalization and Feminist Activism, Rowman and Littlefield, 2006.
- Feminist Inquiry: From Political Conviction to Methodological Innovation, Rutgers University Press, 2006.
- Women, Democracy and Globalization in North America, Palgrave, 2006. (Co-authored with Jane Bayes, Patricia Begné, Laura Gonzalez, Lois Harder, and Laura MacDonald)
- Beyond Oppression: Feminist Theory and Political Strategy, New York: Continuum Press, 1990.
- Theoretical Issues in Policy Analysis, Albany: State University of New York Press, 1988.

=== Edited works ===
- Oxford Handbook of Feminist Theory, Oxford University Press, 2016. (Edited with Lisa Disch).
- Gender and Power: Toward Equality and Democratic Governance, Palgrave MacMillan, 2015. (Edited with Mino Vianello).
- Feminist Practices: A Digital Course Reader, University of Chicago Press, 2013.
- War and Terror: Feminist Perspectives, University of Chicago Press, 2008. (Edited with Karen Alexander).
- Routledge Encyclopedia of Government and Politics, 2nd Revised Edition, 2 vols., London: Routledge, 2004. (Edited with Maurice Kogan)
- Gender, Globalization and Democratization, Boulder, Co., Rowman and Littlefield, 2001. (Edited with Rita Mae Kelly, Jane Bayes and Brigitte Young) Translated by Alina Pilea and Nadia Farcaş into Romanian, Gen, Globalizare Şi Democratizare, Bucharest, Editura POLIROM, 2004.
- Feminism and Public Policy. A Special Double Issue of Policy Sciences 27(2–3): 1994.
- Encyclopedia of Government and Politics, 2 vols., London: Routledge, 1992. (Edited with Maurice Kogan).

== Awards and honors ==
Her article, “Congressional Enactments of Race-Gender: Toward a Theory of Raced-Gendered Institutions,” American Political Science Review 97(4):529-550 was awarded the Heinz Eulau Prize for Best Paper Published in APSR in 2003.
