= Jean Fox O'Barr =

American feminist teacher, scholar

Jean Fox O'Barr (born 1942) is an American feminist teacher, scholar, and administrator whose pioneering work helped establish women's studies as a program of academic study and support for women in higher education.

== Biography ==
O'Barr received her undergraduate degree from Indiana University in 1964 and her master's degree (1965) and PhD (1970) in political science from Northwestern University. She also earned a certificate in African Studies from Northwestern in 1970 based on her graduate work in Tanzania. O'Barr moved to North Carolina in 1969 and began teaching courses on Women and Politics at Duke and University of North Carolina at Chapel Hill.

O’Barr is the founding director of Duke University Women's Studies Program and led the program for almost 20 years (1983–2001). In 2000, she was named Distinguished University Service Professor at Duke University, the first woman to be named in school history. She was appointed the Director of Continuing Education at Duke in 1971. For 12 years she directed a counseling and short course program that eventually included the Duke Institute in Retirement, the forerunner of OLLI. O'Barr has won numerous awards for teaching and mentoring. In 2010, she was awarded with one of Duke's highest awards, the University Medal for Distinguished Meritorious Service.

O’Barr pioneered in building relationships with university alumnae and fostering their philanthropic work. Her home on Anderson Street was a lively center of feminist activities for students and alumnae for two decades. O’Barr played a key role in the founding of three additional programs, Duke Women’s Center, the Baldwin Scholars program and the Sallie Bingham Center in the Duke Libraries. After stepping down as Director of Women’s Studies, she taught through the Program in Education until her retirement in 2011. She currently lives in the Durham area.

O'Barr has written nearly 100 articles and books, including Transforming Knowledge: Public Talks on Women’s Studies 1976-2011 (2013), Feminism in Action: Building Community and Institutions through Women's Studies (1995), Women Imagine Change: A Global Anthology of Women's Resistance from 600 B.C.E. to Present (1997; with Eugenia DeLamotte and Natania Meeke), and Africa in the Disciplines: Contributions of the Study of Africa to the Humanities and Social Sciences (1993; with Robert H. Yates and Valentin Y. Mudimbe). As editor of SIGNS she oversaw the publication of six special editions collections of journal articles.

Change magazine named her among One Hundred Outstanding Young Leaders in Education in 1978, and O'Barr was selected for the Ford and Exxon Education Foundation’s study of 25 influential female leaders of the women’s movement.

== Selected works ==
Articles

- J.F. O'Barr. "The Movement to Establish Women's Studies." Encyclopedia of Social Movements 2 (2004): pages 415–421.
- J.F. O'Barr. "My Master List for the Millenium: Commissioned essay." SIGNS: Journal of Women in Society and Culture (special issue) 25.4 (Summer, 2000): pages 1205–1208. (Reprinted in Judith Howard and Carolyn Allen, eds. Feminisms at a Millenium (Chicago: University of Chicago) 2001, pages 202–204.)
- J.F. O'Barr and Kathryn Firmin-Sellers. "African Women in Politics." African Women South of the Sahara all new chapter, revised edition (January, 1995).
- J.F. O'Barr. "Making the Invisible Visible: African Women in Politics and Policy." African Studies Review 18 (1975): pages 19–27.
- J.F. O'Barr. "Report on Changes in Tanzanian Rural Society and Their Relevance for Development Planning." Rural Africana 13 (1971): pages 43–49.

Books

- J.F. O'Barr. Transforming Knowledge: Public Talks on Women’s Studies 1976–2011. 2013.
- J.F. O'Barr. Chapter “What Year Is It?" pages 213–222 in The Evolution of Women’s Studies: Reflections on Triumphs, Controversies and Change, Palgrave, 2008.
- J.F. O'Barr. Chapter "Naming, Sharing, Speaking: Teaching in Midlife" pages 221–230 in Phyllis R. Freeman and Jan Zlotnik Schmidt Wise Women: Reflections of Teachers at Midlife, Routledge, 2000.
- J.F. O'Barr with Eugenia DeLamotte and Natania Meeker. Women Imagine Change: A Global Anthology of Women's Resistance from 600 BCE to Present. New York: Routledge, 1997.
- J.F. O'Barr, with Nancy Hewitt and Nanvy Rosebaugh, eds.. Talking Gender: Public Images, Personal Journeys, and Political Critiques. Chapel Hill, North Carolina: University of North Carolina, 1996.
- J.F. O'Barr. Feminism in Action: Building Institutions and Community Through Women's Studies. Chapel Hill, North Carolina: University of North Carolina, 1994.
- J.F. O'Barr with Robert H. Yates and Valentin Y. Mudimbe, eds. Africa and the Disciplines: Contributions of the Study of Africa to the Humanities and Social Sciences. Chicago: University of Chicago, 1993.
