= Luz María Pizá Núñez =

Mexican painter (born 1950)

Luz María Pizá Núñez (born 1950) is a Mexican painter whose work has been recognized with membership in Mexico's Salón de la Plástica Mexicana. During her career, she has participated in numerous collective exhibitions, with three important individual exhibitions: En la Tierra, en la Luna, en el Sol y en otras parte at the Escuela Nacional de Artes Plásticas (1976), Labertintos del Espíritu at the Salón de la Plástica Mexicana (1995) and Resonancia Interior, also at the Salón de la Plástica Mexicana. In 2008, she was recognized by CONAPRED for her work with the project Mujer, Discapacidad y Arte.
