= Gary Braver =

American writer

Gary Goshgarian, better known by his pen name Gary Braver, is the author of nine thrillers and mysteries.

Goshgarian is an assistant professor of English at Northeastern University in Boston. He has taught fiction-writing workshops throughout the United States and Europe. He is the author of five college writing textbooks with Pearson Education.

== Early life ==
Goshgarian was born in Hartford, CT. He earned a degree in physics from Worcester Polytechnic Institute. WPI awarded him the Robert H. Goddard Award for Outstanding Professional Achievement in 2014.

Goshgarian decided he wanted to write when he finished college, and went on to the University of Connecticut where he received an MA in English, followed by a Ph.D. in English from the University of Wisconsin–Madison.

== Writing career ==
Goshgarian wrote three novels under his own name before writing the next six under his pseudonym, Gary Braver. "Braver" is a translation of the name of Goshgarian's paternal grandfather (Garabed Markarian).

Several of his novels have a biomedical slant including Elixir, Gray Matter, and Flashback, which won the Massachusetts Honor Book Award for Fiction in 2006. Other novels have archaeological themes, including Atlantis Fire and The Stone Circle.

His book Choose Me, a murder mystery co-authored with Tess Gerritsen, was published in July 2021.
