= Danuta Fjellestad =

Danuta Fjellestad (born 1952) is a professor of American Literary studies at The English Department of Uppsala University, Sweden. She was appointed the professor's chair in 2007 and has since then been teaching and conducting research on postmodern and post-postmodern literature, with an interest in visuality studies as-well-as technologies in, and as a part of, literature. As an author, she is widely held in libraries worldwide.

== Early life and education ==
Fjellestad was born in Poland in 1952 as Danuta Maria Zadworna. She started her career and interest in American Literature while in her native country before moving to Sweden to pursue a Ph.D in the subject. She graduated from Stockholm University in 1986 with the publication of Alice's adventures in wonderland and Gravity's rainbow: A study in duplex fiction. The Ph.D defense as well as every other publication up until the millennial shift were published with the dual surname Zadworna-Fjellestad. After that, and to this day, she publishes with her married name, Danuta Fjellestad.

== Career ==
Fjellestad has held the position of Visiting Scholar at the Center for Twentieth-Century Studies, University of Wisconsin-Milwaukee (1986, 1989), Columbia University (1996), Bucknell University (2000-2001), Franke Institute for the Humanities, University of Chicago (2008). She has been asked to provide input and worked as an expert for VR, the Research Council of Norway, Riksbankens Jubileumsfond, and STINT.

Besides her Professorship at Uppsala University, she is also part of the faculty at the [Futures of American Studies Institute] at Dartmouth College. In 2010 Fjellestad was voted into the board at Veteskapsrådet and after the mandate of three years she was re-elected as he vice chancellor of VR, which is a position she holds in 2014.

== Selected publications ==
- "Mocking Photographic Truth the Case of Ha!" Image & Narrative 2013.
- "Toward a Concept of Post-Postmodernism or: Lady Gaga’s Reconfigurations of Madonna.” (with M. Engberg) Reconstruction: Studies in Contemporary Culture 2012. http://reconstruction.eserver.org/Issues/124/Fjellestad-Engberg.shtml
- “The Pictorial Turn in the Contemporary Novel.” English Past and Present. Ed. Wolfgang Viereck. Frankfurt am Mein: Peter Lang, 2012. 127–136.
- “Resisting Extinction: The Pictorial in Contemporary American Literature.” Writing Technologies 3.1 (2010): 11–24.
- Authority Matters: Rethinking the Theory and Practice of Authorship. Co-editor; co-author of the introduction. Amsterdam: Rodopi, 2008.
- “A Traveling Intellectual: Lost and Found in Translation.” The Postmodern Return: Theory—Travel Writing—Autobiography. Ed. Klaus Stierstorfer. Heidelberg: Heidelberg UP, 2005.
