= Suzanna Danuta Walters =

American sociologist and feminist scholar

Academic background
- Education: CUNY Graduate Center
- Thesis: Lives together/worlds apart: Mothers and daughters in popular culture (1990)
- Doctoral advisor: Stanley Aronowitz

Academic work
- Institutions: Northeastern University
- Main interests: Sociology, gender studies

Suzanna Danuta Walters is the director of the Women's, Gender, and Sexuality Studies Program and professor of sociology at Northeastern University, Boston. She is also the editor-in-chief of Signs: Journal of Women in Culture and Society and the author of several books, including The Tolerance Trap: How God, Genes, and Good Intentions are Sabotaging Gay Equality. She wrote an op-ed titled "Why can't we hate men?" in The Washington Post.

== Education ==
Walters attended Mount Holyoke College in 1983 and gained her Ph.D. from the Graduate Center of the City University of New York in 1990.

== Bibliography ==
=== Books ===
- Danuta Walters, Suzanna (1990). Lives together/worlds apart: mothers and daughters in popular culture (Ph.D. thesis). City University of New York. OCLC 23706659.
- Danuta Walters, Suzanna (1992). Lives together/worlds apart: mothers and daughters in popular culture. Berkeley: University of California Press. ISBN 9780520078512.
- Danuta Walters, Suzanna (1993). New york criminal law handbook: 1994. Place of publication not identified: Gould Publications. ISBN 9789993213499.
- Danuta Walters, Suzanna (1995). Material girls: making sense of feminist cultural theory. Berkeley: University of California Press. ISBN 9780520089785.
- Danuta Walters, Suzanna (2001). All the rage: the story of gay visibility in America. Chicago: University of Chicago Press. ISBN 9780226872315.
- Danuta Walters, Suzanna; Kimmel, Michael. Intersections: transdisciplinary perspectives on genders and sexualities. New York: New York University Press. OCLC 800925019.
- Danuta Walters, Suzanna (2014). The tolerance trap: how God, genes, and good intentions are sabotaging gay equality. New York: New York University Press. ISBN 9780814770573.

=== Book chapters ===
- Danuta Walters, Suzanna (2001). "Caged heat: the (r)evolution of women-in-prison films". In McCaughey, Martha; King, Neal (eds.). Reel knockouts violent women in the movies. Austin, Texas: University of Texas Press. pp. 106–123. ISBN 9780292752511.

=== Journal articles ===
- Danuta Walters, Suzanna (January 1985). "Caught in the web: a critique of spiritual feminism". Berkeley Journal of Sociology. 30: 15–40. JSTOR 41035342.
- Danuta Walters, Suzanna (Autumn–Winter 1989). "As her hand crept slowly up her thigh: Ann Bannon and the politics of pulp". Social Text. 23 (23): 83–101. doi:10.2307/466422. JSTOR 466422.
- Danuta Walters, Suzanna (Summer 1996). "From here to queer: radical feminism, postmodernism, and the lesbian menace (or, why can't a woman be more like a fag?)". Signs: Journal of Women in Culture and Society. 21 (4): 830–869. doi:10.1086/495123. JSTOR 3175026. S2CID 142009001.
- Danuta Walters, Suzanna (December 2012). "The kids are all right but the lesbians aren't: queer kinship in US culture". Sexualities. 15 (8): 917–933. doi:10.1177/1363460712459311. S2CID 145645565.
- Danuta Walters, Suzanna (Spring 2015). "Inaugural editorial: thinking and doing feminism". Signs: Journal of Women in Culture and Society. 40 (3): 539–544. doi:10.1086/680025. JSTOR 680025. S2CID 146463651. Text.

=== Other media ===
- Danuta Walters, Suzanna (8 June 2018). "Why can't we hate men?". The Washington Post | Opinion.
