= Jane Desmond =

American academic

Jane C. Desmond is a published author and the co-founder and director of the International Forum for U.S. Studies. She is a professor of Anthropology and Gender and Women's Studies at the University of Illinois at Urbana-Champaign.

== Education ==
Desmond earned her Bachelor of Arts in Music and Dance from Brown University in 1973. In 1975, she received a Master of Fine Arts with a concentration in dance from Sarah Lawrence College. It was ten years later that Desmond completed a graduate study in media theory, production, and criticism at the University of North Carolina at Chapel Hill. She then began her graduate education in American Studies at Yale University earning her M.Phil in 1991. Desmond earned a doctorate in American Studies with a background in performance arts, the fine arts and transnational study in 1993.

== Career ==
Beginning in 1975, Desmond's career in academia has spanned across many institutions and faculties. At Cornell University she was a lecturer in dance (1975-1978) as well as an assistant professor and co-director of the dance performance program (1978-1980). Soon after she began at Duke University as an artist-in-resident in dance (1982-1993) and later as the director of the Duke in New York arts program (1990-1992). In her time at Duke she was appointed full-time faculty. In 1993 she started work at the University of Iowa, as an associate professor of American Studies and Women's Studies (1993-1999), then as a tenured associate professor of American Studies (1996-2000), next an associate professor of International Studies (2003-2006), and lastly an associate Dean of International Programs (2004-2006). Her international teaching experience includes her time as an Otto Salgo Chair in American Studies at Eötvös Loránd University in Budapest, Hungary (2000), and a guest teacher in the American Studies Department at La Sapienza University in Rome, Italy (2016, 2018).

Desmond is the co-founder and director with Virginia Dominguez of The International Forum for U.S. Studies, the founding resident director of the Summer Institute in Animal Studies at the Center for Advanced Study, and a professor of Anthropology and Gender and Women's Studies at the University of Illinois (UIUC). At UIUC, affiliated faculty include the Department of Dance, the College of Fine Arts, and the College of Veterinary Medicine.

== Grants, honours and awards ==
Desmond was appointed a faculty associate at the UIUC Center for Advanced Study, directing the Human-Animal Studies at Illinois Initiative from 2020 to 2021. The University of Illinois Urbana-Champaign has also awarded her the Arnold O. Beckman Award for Research (2018), granted her a tenured faculty fellowship and associate appointment at the UIUC Centre for Advanced Study (2016), appointed her as an annual faculty-associate in residence (2010-2011), and named her the Humanities Research Institute Faculty Scholar (2009-2010).

At the University of Illinois, Desmond was awarded the Arts and Humanities Individual Research Award (2004) and the Interdisciplinary Course Development Award (2002). She was also named their Global Scholar (2000-2002).

Other notable achievements include The National Op-Ed Project Public Voices Fellow (2019-2020), the University of Edinburgh Centre for Advanced Study Fellowship (2019), her appointment as the Eminent World Scholar as a visiting professor at Beijing Foreign Studies University as part of the American Studies program (2009), being named president of the International American Studies Association (2007-2011) and her CIC Academic Leadership Program Fellowship (2005-2006).

Her notable grants include the Hewlett Foundation, The Ford Foundation, and The Rockefeller Foundation.

== Major works ==
- Desmond, J., 2019. Vivacious Remains: An Afterword on Taxidermy's Forms, Fictions, Facticity, and Futures. Configurations, 27(2), pp. 257–266.
- Desmond, J.C., 2019. Zones of Production in Possible Worlds: Dance's Precarious Placement, an Afterword. Dance Research Journal, 51(1), pp. 96–101.
- Desmond, J.C., 2018. Leisurely death and dying?: Body, place, and the limits to leisure-a prologue. In Leisure and Death: An Anthropological Tour of Risk, Death, and Dying (pp. ix-xviii). University Press of Colorado.
- Desmond, J., 2017. “Make ‘America’Smart Again”: A Response to Trump’s First 100 Days. Comparative American Studies, 15(1-2), pp. 4–6.
- Desmond, J.C., 2017. Reading “America” Across and Against the Grain of Public Discourse. In Global Perspectives on the United States: Pro-Americanism, Anti-Americanism, and the Discourses Between (pp. 1–3). University of Illinois Press.
- Desmond, J.C., 2016. Displaying death and animating Life. University of Chicago Press.
