= Antoni Pizà =

Spanish musicologist

Antoni Pizà, born in Felanitx, Mallorca, Spain, in 1962, is a musicologist. After receiving a PhD at the Graduate Center of the City University of New York in 1994, he taught music history at Hofstra University in Long Island, New York. He also taught at the City College of New York, the John Jay College of Criminal Justice, and at the Conservatorio Superior de Música de las Islas Baleares (Conservatory of Music and Dance, Palma). He is currently the director of the Foundation for Iberian Music and a member of the doctoral faculty in music at the Graduate Center of CUNY. Since the 2000s, he has curated a series of musical events at the Graduate Center featuring well-known musicians and authors, including Charles Rosen, Philip Glass, Claire Chase, David Harrington, Roger Scruton, Greil Marcus, Richard Taruskin, Paul Griffiths, and others.

== Published works ==
- Pizà, Antoni (2023). Listening to the World: A Brief Survey of World Music. New York, New York, USA: Pressbooks.
- Pizà, Antoni; Goldberg, K. Meira, eds. (2022). The Body Questions: Celebrating Flamenco's Tangled Roots. Newcastle upon Tyne, UK: Cambridge Scholars Publishing. ISBN 9781527576926.
- —; Martínez, María Luisa, eds. (2022). Tomás Bretón: Quinteto en sol mayor para piano y cuerda. Madrid, Spain: Instituto Complutense de Ciencias Musicales.
- —; Martínez, María Luisa, eds. (2022). Gioachino Rossini: La Veuve andalouse. Kassel, Germany: Reichenberger.
- —, ed. (2022). The Way of the Moderns: Six Perspectives on Modernism in Music. Turnhout, Belgium: Brepols.
- —; Goldberg, K. Meira; Clark, Walter Aaron, eds. (2019). Transatlantic Malagueñas and Zapateados in Music, Song and Dance. Newcastle upon Tyne, UK: Cambridge Scholars Publishing. ISBN 9781527532205.
- —; Vicens, Francesc, eds. (2019). Música de Jazz: Conferències de 1935. Palma (Mallorca): Lleonard Muntaner. ISBN 9788417153793.
- —; Goldberg, K. Meira, eds. (2016). The Global Reach of the Fandango in Music, Song and Dance: Spaniards, Indians, Africans and Gypsies. Newcastle upon Tyne, UK: Cambridge Scholars Publishing. ISBN 9781443899635.
- — (2012). La dansa de l'arquitecte. Muro: Ensiola. ISBN 9788493914875.
- — (2012). En la república del ruido: Crónicas musicales de Nueva York. Palma: Documenta. ISBN 9788415432180.
- — (2010). Nits simfòniques. Muro: Ensiola. ISBN 9788493712983.
- — (2007). William J. Summers; Craig H. Russell; Antoni Gili (eds.). J.B. Sancho: Pioneer Composer of California. Palma de Mallorca: Universitat de les Illes Balears. ISBN 9788476323427.
- — (2006). Alan Lomax: Mirades Miradas Glances. Barcelona: Lunwerg / Fundacio Sa Nostra. ISBN 8497852710.
- — (2003). El doble silenci: Reflexions sobre música i músics. Palma de Mallorca: Edicions Documenta Balear. ISBN 8495694859.
- — (2002). Antoni Literes: Introducció a la seva obra (in Spanish). Palma de Mallorca: Edicions Documenta Balear. ISBN 8495694506.
- —; Amengual, Bartomeu (2001). Bravo Joan Pons!: L'univers del baríton a Nova York. Palma de Mallorca: Documenta Balear. ISBN 8495694239. Prologue by Luciano Pavarotti.
- — (2000). Francesc Guerau i el seu temps. Palma de Mallorca: Govern de les Illes Balears, Conselleria d'Educació i Cultura, Direcció General de Cultura, Institut d'Estudis Baleàrics. ISBN 8489868506.
- — (1996). El music Joan Aulí. Felanitx, Mallorca: Centre Cultural, Ajuntament de Felanitx.
- — (1994). The Tradition of Autobiography in Music (Thesis). Graduate Center at the City University of New York.
