= Maker education =

Maker education (a term coined by Dale Dougherty in 2013) closely associated with STEM learning, is an approach to problem-based and project-based learning that relies upon hands-on, often collaborative, learning experiences as a method for solving authentic problems. People who participate in making often call themselves "makers" of the maker movement and develop their projects in makerspaces, or development studios which emphasize prototyping and the repurposing of found objects in service of creating new inventions or innovations. Culturally, makerspaces, both inside and outside of schools, are associated with collaboration and the free flow of ideas. In schools, maker education stresses the importance of learner-driven experience, interdisciplinary learning, peer-to-peer teaching, iteration, and the notion of "failing forward", i.e. the idea that mistake-based learning is crucial to the learning process and eventual success of a project.

== Influences ==
Maker education is an offshoot of the maker movement, which Time magazine described as "the umbrella term for independent innovators, designers and tinkerers. A convergence of computer hackers and traditional artisans, the niche is established enough to have its own magazine, Make, as well as hands-on Maker Faires that are catnip for DIYers who used to toil in solitude". Dale Dougherty, founder of the Maker Faire and Make magazine, stated in his 2011 TED Talk that "We are all makers. We are born makers. We don't just live, but we make." In the same TED Talk, Dougherty also called for making to be embraced in education, as students are the new generation of makers. Another central contributor to the maker movement, Chris Anderson, who was once the editor-in-chief of Wired magazine and is now the CEO of 3D Robotics, wrote a manifesto of the maker movement in 2012, called "Makers". His third book, Makers: The New Industrial Revolution (2012), emphasizes the role that making has to play in the renaissance of American manufacturing. Mark Hatch, formerly the CEO of TechShop, also published "The Maker Movement Manifesto". In addition to these contributions, seminal texts include, Invent To Learn: Making, Tinkering, and Engineering in the Classroom by Sylvia Libow Martinez, and The Art of Tinkering, by Karen Wilkinson and Mike Petrich, founders of The Tinkering Studio at the Exploratorium.

In the United States, hands-on learning through making has roots in the nineteenth century, as a result of the influence of educators such as Calvin M. Woodward, who established the Manual Training School of Washington University on June 6, 1879. Unlike later vocational education that would take hold in 1917 through the Smith-Hughes Act that had the aim of reducing the United States reliance on foreign trade, the impetus for the Manual Training School was to provide students with training in making and craftsmanship that had "no immediate vocational goal". Today's maker education highlights students' potential to "change the world" and "let their imaginations run wild" while also emphasizing building students' entrepreneurship skills and ability to earn money by selling their inventions.

That Arts and Crafts movement of the late nineteenth century is sometimes also referenced in relationship with the maker movement. The Arts and Crafts movement, which originated in Britain before taking hold in Europe and North America, was anti-industrial, critical of machinery and factory production, advocating instead for a return to traditional craftsmanship.

== Development and expansion ==
Since 2005, maker education has gained momentum in schools across the United States and around the world. Proponents of the maker movement cite the potential for making to bring more women to STEM fields and close the gender gap. Other potential benefits and goals for making include creating greater educational equity among students in public schools, and the possibility for making to be a driver in educational and societal change. Other educators and innovators have developed offshoot curriculum and technologies related to the intersection of critical thinking and making, called critical making.

In school models, such as the Lighthouse Community Charter, a charter school in Oakland, California, Aaron Van der Woorf, the robotics teacher leads the students in Maker Ed. At the Park School, in collaboration with Harvard's Project Zero, students hold a mini maker faire in school that also acts as a fundraiser for the school. Some districts have also adopted maker education district-wide, such as the district of Elizabeth Forward, just south of Pittsburgh, which partnered with Carnegie Mellon to provide professional development for teachers through working with students on Maker Ed. Principals in Albemarle County schools cite Superintendent Pam Moran as instrumental in bringing maker education to their school district.

School Maker Faires feature a display of maker education themed projects, and number over 100 per year. The U.S. contains the majority of the annual School Maker Faires, but they also occur across all continents, although they are often organized by U.S. organizations such as the Nanshan School Maker Faire in China organized by SteamHead. School events are sometimes not open to public admission, but the official Maker Faire website lists all past and upcoming shows and oftentimes schools encourage the general public to spectate and interact with student exhibitions.

In addition to bringing maker education to schools, scholars like Paulo Blikstein of Stanford University and Dennis Krannich of the University Bremen, in Germany, state that, "Digital fabrication and 'making,' and the positive social movement around them, could be an unprecedented opportunity for educators to advance a progressive educational agenda in which project-based, interest-driven, student-centered learning are at the center stage of students' educational experiences.". Penketh High School in Warrington became the first state school in the United Kingdom to establish a dedicated makerspace embedded into the curriculum in 2017, led by physics teacher Caroline Keep. Keep's earlier work with Mark Feltham at Liverpool John Moores University from 2013–14, developing one of the first makerspaces in UK higher education through the HEdWorks Project, had laid the groundwork for this approach. Keep and Feltham also co-founded Liverpool MakeFest in 2015 alongside Denise Jones of Liverpool Libraries, which grew into a major national maker education event designed to widen the access for educators to makers. It celebrated its 10th anniversary in 2025."

The Obama administration has also strongly supported the growing maker movement as an integral part of STEM education, which it hopes will increase American students ability to compete globally in the areas of science, engineering, and math. At the White House, President Obama hosted the first ever White House Maker Faire in June, 2014, adopting the idea that Americans are a "Nation of Makers". On the Nation of Makers webpage, Americans are encouraged to join the movement, asserting that "empowering students and adults to create, innovate, tinker, and make their ideas and solutions into reality is at the heart of the Maker Movement". Since the first-ever White House Maker Faire, the Obama administration has "continued to support opportunities for students to learn about STEM through making, expand the resources available for maker entrepreneurs, and foster the development of advanced manufacturing in the U.S." In summer 2015, the President announced the National Week of Making, June 17–23, to support the Nation of Makers. In 2016, President Obama renewed his commitment to maker education by continuing the National Week of Making. The National Maker Faire will include participation from the Department of Agriculture, the Department of Energy, the Department of the Navy (Navy), the Institute of Museum and Library Services, the National Aeronautics and Space Administration (NASA), the National Endowment for the Arts, and the National Institute of Standards and Technology (NIST). At the time of this announcement, the President also detailed the progress that had been made on the Nation of Makers. He announced,

- Eight Federal agencies are announcing new grants, education initiatives, training, knowledge networks, and other supports to help create more makers and assist more entrepreneurs to take prototypes to scale with new ventures.
- More than 1,400 K–12 schools, representing almost 1 million students from all 50 states, are committing to dedicating a space for making, designating a champion for making, and having a public showcase of student projects.
- More than 100 additional commitments including the distribution of 1 million foldable microscopes to children around the world by Foldscope Instruments; the investment in 100 new makerspaces by Google as part of the Making Spaces program; and new steps to support making at 77 universities and colleges through Make Schools Alliance.

In addition to these developments, on June 17, 2016, the White House issued a press release, detailing the next steps the United States government will take to support the development and expansion of maker education.

In 2015 the China Premier, Li Keqiang, decreed that makerspaces would be a part of China's economic development plan. This was followed by the government funding of hundreds of makerspaces across China. In the years that followed, many public and private schools opened school makerspaces where students could build and innovate, propelled by government sponsored makerspaces and international school makerspaces such as the Shenzhen American International School makerspace, makerSAIS, opened by SteamHead in 2014.

== Critique ==
Though maker education has been embraced by thousands of schools and school districts across the United States and abroad, there has also emerged criticism of the movement.

Among the critics is Evgeny Morozov, a Belarusian writer and researcher, whose work focuses on the impact, both social and political, of technology. In his article published in The New Yorker, entitled, "Making It: Pick up a spot welder and join the revolution", Morozov criticizes Chris Anderson for "confusing the history of the Web with the history of capitalism and ends by speculating about the future of the maker movement, which, on closer examination, is actually speculation on the future of capitalism". He also criticizes companies and organizations that were once committed to open source software for becoming acquired by for-profit companies and embroiled in copyright and trademark lawsuits. Morozov also criticizes the maker movement's major contributors financial relationship with DARPA, which made a $10 million grant to support maker education for high school students, and $3.5 million to TechShop to establish new makerspaces.

While Morozov is one of the more vocal critics of maker education, he is not the only one. Debbie Chachra, associate professor at Olin College of Engineering, in her article in the January 23, 2015 issue of The Atlantic, entitled, "Why I Am Not a Maker", centers her criticism on "the social history of who makes things—and who doesn't". Chachra describes the history of the "makers" of products as men, rather than those who cared for "hearth and home", that is, historically, women. She calls for recognition of "the work of the educators, those that analyze and characterize and critique, everyone who fixes things, all the other people who do valuable work with and for others—above all, the caregivers—whose work isn't about something you can put in a box and sell". In "A more lovingly made world", by McKenzie Wark of The New School, Wark writes that the problem with maker culture is that makers don't actually make things, they assemble them. While this experience is satisfying and fun (and Wark does acknowledge the way in which his children are not hemmed in by gender expectations while playing at the Maker Faire), it doesn't teach the underlying principles required for the actual making of functional objects. It also does not, though Chris Anderson and Mark Hatch evoke Marx in their Maker manifestos, map accurately onto an understanding of labor, and certainly not the life of the laborer.

Shirin Vossoughi and Paula K. Hooper of Northwestern University, and Meg Escude of Exploratorium, offer an in-depth look at the ways in which maker education reinforces educational inequality. They begin by offering Haitian writer, Edwidge Danticat's commentary on making: "If you can't afford clothes, but you can make them--make them. You have to work with what you have, especially if you don't 'have a lot of money. You use creativity, and you use imagination."

A Focus on Equity: However, researchers, such as Calabrese Barton and Tan, have argued that youth make in ways that promote new just social futures. The object of making is not the artifact itself, but rather social justice. In their 4-year longitudinal study of youth makers they illustrated how making with and for the community opened opportunity for youth to project their communities' rich cultural knowledge and wisdom onto their making while also troubling and negotiating the historicized injustices they experience.
