= Audience theory =

Set of theories in media studies

Audience theory offers explanations of how people encounter media, how they use it, and how it affects them. Although the concept of an audience predates modern media, most audience theory is concerned with people’s relationship to various forms of media. There is no single theory of audience, but a range of explanatory frameworks. These can be rooted in the social sciences, rhetoric, literary theory, cultural studies, communication studies and network science depending on the phenomena they seek to explain. Audience theories can also be pitched at different levels of analysis ranging from individuals to large masses or networks of people.

James Webster suggested that audience studies could be organized into three overlapping areas of interest. One conceives of audiences as the site of various outcomes. This runs the gamut from a large literature on media influence to various forms of rhetorical and literary theory. A second conceptualizes audiences as agents who act upon media. This includes the literature on selective processes, media use and some aspects of cultural studies. The third see the audiences as a mass with its own dynamics apart from the individuals who constitute the mass. This perspective is often rooted in economics, marketing, and some traditions in sociology. Each approach to audience theory is discussed below.

== Audience as outcome ==
Many audience theorists are concerned with what media do to people. There is a long tradition in the social sciences of investigating “media effects.” Early examples include the Payne Fund Studies, which assessed how movies affected young people, and Harold Lasswell’s analysis of WWI propaganda. Some have criticized early work for lacking analytical rigor and encouraging a belief in powerful effects.

Subsequent work in the social sciences employed a variety of methods to assess the media’s power to change attitudes and behaviors such as voting and violence. Sociologists Elihu Katz and Paul Lazarsfeld introduced the concept of a two-step flow in communication, which suggested that media influence was moderated by opinion leaders. By the late 1950s, most researchers concluded that media effects were limited by psychological processes like selective exposure, social networks, and the commercial nature of media. This new consensus was dubbed the “dominant paradigm” of media sociology and it was criticized for being too reductionist and understating the true power of media.

While the tenets of that limited effects perspective retain much of their appeal, later theories have highlighted various ways in which media operate on audiences. These audience outcomes include:

- Agenda-setting: Asserts that media don’t tell people what to think (e.g., attitude change) but what to think about. Hence, media have the power to make things salient, setting the public agenda.
- Spiral of silence: Stipulates that people fear social isolation and look toward media to assess popular opinion. Hence, media portrayals (accurate or not) can lead people to remain silent if they believe their opinion is unpopular.
- Framing: Argues that media present a selective view of reality, privileging certain frames like problem definitions or moral judgments. Hence, media have the power to create interpretations of social reality.
- Knowledge-gap: Stipulates that as the media environment becomes more information rich, higher social-economic groups acquire information at a higher rate than others. Hence, media can polarize society into better and less well informed segments.
- Cultivation theory: Argues that television programs create a pervasive, but systematically distorted picture of social reality, leading heavy viewers to unthinkingly accept that reality. Hence, television has the power to cultivate distorted perceptions of reality.
- Third-person effects: Asserts that individuals believe that they are relatively impervious to media influence, while believing others are susceptible. Hence, they believe media have effects (on others) and behave accordingly.

Humanists have also been concerned with how media operate on audiences. With a specific focus on rhetoric, some, such as Walter Ong, have suggested that the audience is a construct made up by the rhetoric and the rhetorical situation the text is addressing. Similarly, some forms of literary criticism such as Screen theory, argue that cinematic texts actually create spectators by sewing them into subject positions. In effect, audience members become unwitting accomplices in the production of meanings as orchestrated by the text. Hence media can promote widespread ideological outcomes such as false consciousness and hegemony.

== Audience as agent ==
Emphasizing the agency of audiences takes a different approach to audience theory. Simply put, rather than asking what media do to people, these theories ask what people do to media. Such approaches, which are sometimes referred to as active audience theories, have been the province of the humanities and social sciences.

The Centre for Contemporary Cultural Studies, was founded at the University of Birmingham, England in the 1960s by Stuart Hall and Richard Hoggart. Hall was instrumental in promoting what he called the “encoding/decoding” model of communication (described below). This argued that audiences had the ability to read texts in ways that were not intended by the producer of the text. Subsequent work at the Centre provided empirical support for the model. Amongst these was The Nationwide Project by David Morley and Charlotte Brunsdon. Humanistic theories of audience agency are often grounded in theoretical perspectives such as structuralism, feminism, and Marxism. Notable examples include:

- Encoding/Decoding: Which stipulates that organizations produce texts with encoded meanings, but that individuals have the ability to understand (decode) those texts in accordance with their own beliefs, producing dominant, negotiated and oppositional readings.
- Reception theory: An application of reader response theory that argues the meaning of a text is not inherent within the text itself, but the audience must elicit meaning based on their individual cultural background and life experiences.

Social scientific interest in audiences as agents is, in part, a consequence of research on media effects. Two lynch pins of the limited effects perspective, selective processes and the two-step flow of communication, describe how the actions of audience members mitigate media influence. Hence, one cannot understand what media do to people without understanding how people use media. Still other strains of social science investigate media choice as something worthy of study in its own right. Examples include:

- Selective exposure: Assumes that people seek out media that confirm their actions and beliefs and avoid messages that produce cognitive dissonance. Selective exposure to partisan media is thought to contribute to social polarization.
- Selective perception: Another selective process in which individuals interpret information they encounter so that it conforms with their beliefs. It is akin to decoding and contributes to confirmation bias.
- Uses and gratifications theory: Argues that people have needs they seek to gratify by actively consuming media toward that end. It assumes that audience members are awareness of their motivations for using media.
- Models of program choice: An application of welfare economics that assumes people have well-defined program preferences and that they choose programs in accordance with those preferences. These micro-level assumptions are intended to predict aggregate audience formations.

== Audience as mass ==
A third emphasis in audience theory explains the forces that shape audiences. Understanding mass audience behavior has been a concern of media owners and advertisers since the dawn of mass media. By the early twentieth century, broadcasters were using programming strategies to better manage audiences. By mid-century, economists introduced theoretical models of program choice (see above). By the 1960s, marketing practitioners and academics began testing statistical models of mass audience behavior.

Today, there are two main ways to conceptualize the audience as a mass. These correspond to the principal forms of media: linear media like broadcasting and network television, and more recently nonlinear or on demand media supported by digital networks. The former conceives of an audience as mass as it was first described by Herbert Blumer. Essentially, the audience is a collection of individuals who are anonymous to one another, act independently, and are united by a common object of attention. The latter variation conceives of audiences as networks, in which individual audience members may be visible to one another and are capable of acting in concert. Work on the audience as a mass makes little use of the individual traits discussed above (e.g., attitudes, need, preferences) and relies instead on structural factors and the law of large numbers to reveal patterns of behavior. Examples include:

- Laws of viewing: Argues that television audiences exhibit law-like regularities which allow analysts to predict audience formation. These empirical regularities include the “duplication of viewing law” and the “law of double jeopardy.”
- Social network analysis (SNA): Offers a method for investigating the structure of social networks, which consist of nodes (individuals or websites) and links (relationships or ties). SNA reveals emergent properties in digital media such as information cascades and power law or "long tail" distributions.
- Audience networks: Applies SNA to audience behavior by casting media outlets as nodes and defining tie strength based on audience duplication between nodes. Audience networks highlight the centrality of mainstream outlets and draw into question the existence of media enclaves or echo chambers.

One might imagine that explanations of mass audience behavior could be based on the micro-level factors featured in theories of audience agency. But these have a limited ability to explain large-scale patterns of audience behavior such as audience flow, audience fragmentation, or how media “go viral.” To explain those behaviors, theorists are more likely to rely on structural factors such as networks, hyperlinks, platforms, algorithms, audience availabilities and cultural proximity.

== See also ==
- Attention economy
- Audience effect
- Audience measurement
- Audience memory curve
- Digital divide
- Digital media
- Ethnography of communication
- Filter bubble
- Frankfurt school
- Ideology
- Genre
- Mass society
- Media consumption
- Media psychology
- Public opinion
- Taste
