= Audience fragmentation =

Concept in mass media

Audience fragmentation describes the extent to which audiences are distributed across media offerings. Traditional outlets, such as broadcast networks, have long feared that technological and regulatory changes would increase competition and erode their audiences. Social scientists have been concerned about the loss of a common cultural forum and breakout of extremist media. Hence, many representations of fragmentation have focused on media outlets as the unit of analysis and reported the status of their audiences. But fragmentation can also be conceptualized at the level of individuals and audiences, revealing different features of the phenomenon. Webster and Ksiazek have argued there are three types of fragmentation: media-centric, user-centric, and audience-centric.

== Media-centric fragmentation ==
The diffusion of audiences across outlets has been most pronounced in electronic media. Initially, a limited number of broadcast channels, in both commercial and state-owned systems, dominated public attention. But as cable television and online media became more prevalent, each new arrival claimed a sliver of the audience. The widespread availability of on-demand digital media has further fragmented audiences.

Media-centric representations use discrete media offerings (e.g. movies, channels, websites, etc.) as the units of analysis, and associate each with some measure of audience size. These data are typically reported as either a time series or a long tail distribution.

A time series can show how the audience for an outlet or category of outlets has changed over time. For example, in 1985 the three major US networks (i.e., ABC, CBS & NBC) accounted for almost 70% of all prime-time television viewing. By the early twentieth-first century, their combined share of audience dipped below 30%. Such time series are usually done by arranging discrete cross-sectional data in chronological order.

A long tail representation takes data from a point in time (e.g., a month, season or year) and arranges the offerings by audience size from largest to smallest. For example, websites can be organized by their monthly unique visitors. Long tail distributions are akin to power law and Pareto distributions. These graphic representations can be reduced to statistics such as Gini coefficients and Herfindahl–Hirschman Indices. All forms of media consumption invariably show that, even with abundant choices, a relatively small number of offerings tend to dominate the audience, indicating that audience fragmentation does not increase in direct proportion to competition. Persistent audience concentration may be attributable to structural disparities in distribution systems, preferential attachment, recommender systems, social desirability and quality.

Although media-centric studies of fragmentation are common, they have two limitations. First studies are typically confined to a single medium. Second, we cannot see how people move across offerings within a medium or from one medium to the next. Hence, we cannot tell if the audience for an unpopular website is composed of a few loyalists who confine themselves to that niche, of if they also use popular mainstream outlets.

== User-centric fragmentation ==
A different perspective on fragmentation emerges when individual media users are the unit of analysis. Instead of asking how audiences are distributed across offerings, this approach asks how each individual's use of media is distributed across available options. It is fragmentation conceptualized at the micro-level and behaviors can range from people who consume a wide variety of offerings to those whose media use is concentrated on a small number of outlets.

The Nielsen Company has for many years reported that as the number of television channels available to households goes up, the number of channels watched by each adult typically plateaus at around 20. ComScore, an internet measurement company, has reported that in the U.S. the use of mobile apps is concentrated in the top 10, and all but two of these are owned by Google and Facebook. Such data suggest that even with essentially infinite choice, individuals use a small number of "go-to" outlets on a day-to-day basis.

Academic studies of this sort are generally labeled research on "repertoires." The earliest work focused on television channel repertoires and reported results consistent with measurement services. More recent work spans different media and describes people's media repertoires. These studies suggest the users cope with abundance by limiting their consumption to a relatively small number of preferred outlets. The content offered by these outlets is increasingly curated by editors, social networks and algorithms.

User-centric studies can help us understand how individuals make use of multiple media offerings, but they do not easily scale-up to address larger questions of how the public allocates its attention in the aggregate.

== Audience-centric fragmentation ==
Audience-centric studies stand somewhere in between media and user-centric research. The audience for any given outlet is characterized by the extent to which it uses another outlet. For example, to what degree do the users of website A also visit website B. The level of cross-visitation is measured by "audience duplication." Hence, pairs of outlets become the units of analysis, and audience size is measured by the level of duplication. Pairings can be within a medium (e.g. website to website) or they can cross media (e.g., website to TV channel).

Multiple regression has been used to explain audience duplication as a function of the characteristics of pairs. For instance, audience flow between programs is enhanced by scheduling two programs of a type in sequence. Audience-centric approaches to studying fragmentation lend themselves to social network metrics and have been conceptualized as "audience networks."

Audience-centric studies have demonstrated that popular outlets enjoy high levels of duplication with many smaller outlets, and that the audience for small outlets are not composed of loyalists who spend all their time in that niche, but rather they move freely across outlets.

== Consequences of fragmentation ==
Audience fragmentation has many potential consequences. The proliferation of choice seems to have produced an "attention economy" in which a limited supply of human attention becomes a relatively scarce and valuable commodity. Certainly, the growth of media offerings has caused audiences to be more widely distributed than ever before. High levels of attendance to older, incumbent media can no longer be taken as a given. Some analysts expect that people will move away from mass culture and spend their time cloistered in better tailored media enclaves, with consequent disruptions to business, culture and politics. But the effects of fragmentation are not always so straightforward.

Chris Anderson popularized the notion that fragmentation would diminish the prevalence of hits as cultural consumption migrated out on the long tail towards more specialized offerings. The implication of this expectation was that businesses would find it profitable to sell "less of more." Empirical studies of media use, however, suggest that consumption remains highly concentrated on hits, despite the availability of alternatives. In fact, the "blockbuster" strategy remains a mainstay of culture industries.

Increasing levels of audience fragmentation are often taken as a sign of increasing social polarization. But, as noted above, the media-centric representations which are the most common, do not provide adequate documentation of echo chambers. There is evidence that the increased availability of entertainment has diminished the audience for broadcast news and may have increased polarization in knowledge of public affairs. Ideological polarization in news consumption has been widely expected as people are better able to selectively expose themselves to agreeable points of view. The evidence of such "red media – blue media" differences in consumption is less convincing. Rather, it appears that users of ideologically extreme outlets are also users of mainstream news. The prospect that recommender systems may fragment audiences into "filter bubbles" without their knowledge remains a possibility.

== See also ==
- Concentration of media ownership
