= James G. Webster =

American professor and audience researcher

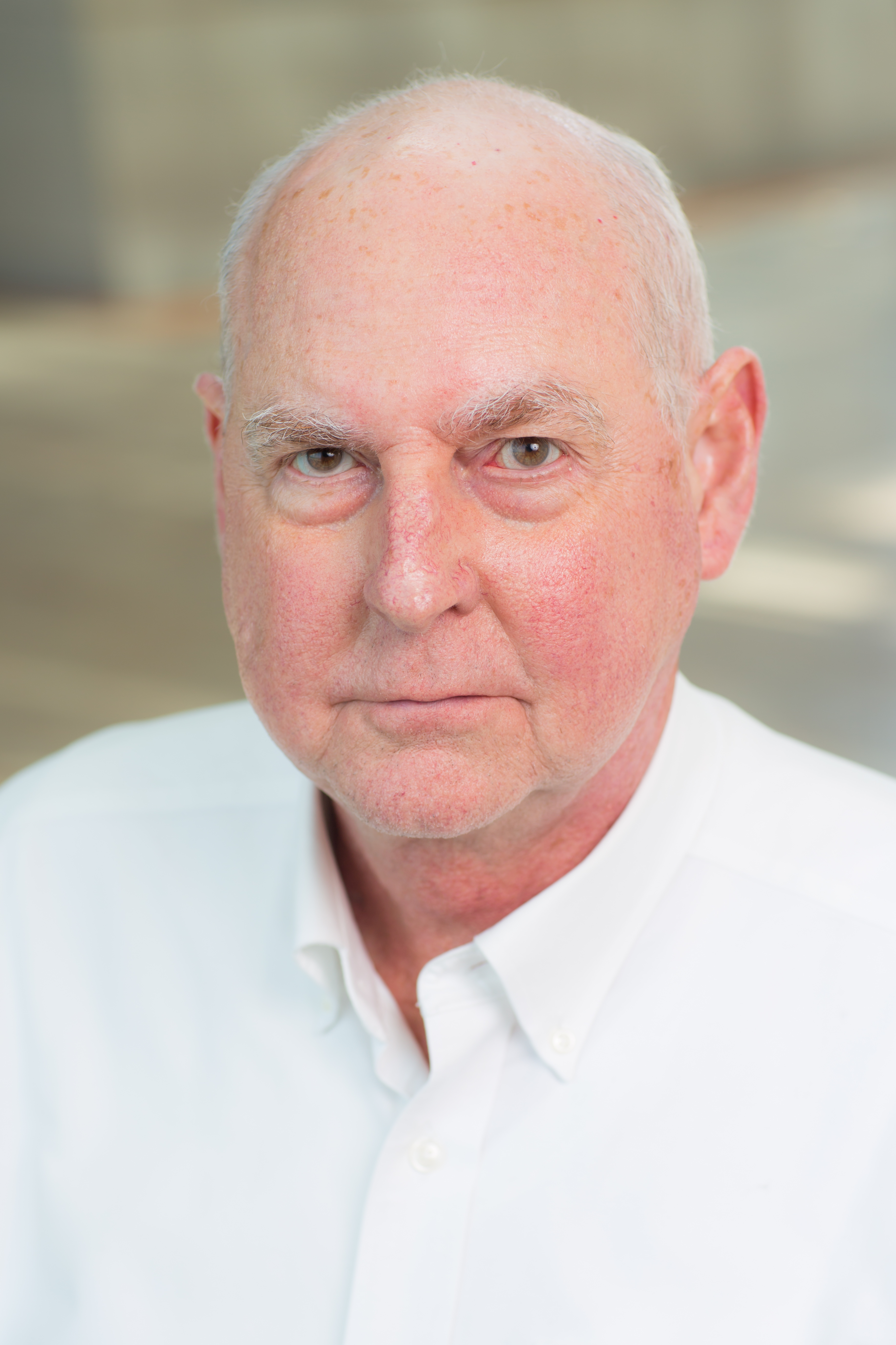
James G. Webster

James G. Webster (born 1951) is a professor and audience researcher at Northwestern University. Webster's publications have documented patterns of audience behavior, sometimes challenging widely held misconceptions. He has also made foundational contributions to audience theory and the methods of audience analysis.

== Career ==
He earned a B.A. from Trinity College (Connecticut). After two years as an audience analyst at Children’s Television Workshop (CTW), he went to Indiana University Bloomington where he earned his Ph.D. There, he studied with Keith Mielke, who would later become Senior Vice President of Research at CTW, Jack Wakshlag, who would later become Chief Research Officer at Turner Broadcasting, and Dolf Zillmann, a pioneer in media psychology. He joined the faculty at Northwestern University in 1986. Webster served as the Senior Associate Dean of the Northwestern University School of Communication for 15 years. During that time, he was instrumental in creating the University’s interdisciplinary doctoral program in Media, Technology and Society. He directed over a dozen doctoral dissertations, and in 2014 received the School’s Clarence Simon Award for outstanding teaching and mentoring. In 2015 he was awarded the Lifetime Achievement in Scholarship Award from the Broadcast Education Association. In 2020, he was designated Professor Emeritus at Northwestern. The following year, he was named a Fellow of the International Communication Association.

== Research & publication ==
Webster’s publications have been widely cited. His books appear in Chinese, Korean and Indian editions. He has lectured at universities around the world including the London School of Economics, the University of Amsterdam, the University of Copenhagen, the University of Zurich, and the Communication University of China. His work includes empirical studies of audience behavior, interventions in audience theory, and novel approaches to analyzing data.

=== Audience behavior ===
Webster’s empirical work typically uses secondary analyses of large datasets to document law-like regularities in audience behavior. Early studies identified the determinants of television audience flow. His 1997 book, The Mass Audience, describes patterns of audience behavior based on analyses of television ratings data. Webster has also produced widely cited research on audience fragmentation which has demonstrated that “beneath the veneer” of fragmentation, audiences move readily among popular and unpopular offerings.

Webster’s findings have often challenged commonly held beliefs. For example, The Long Tail, a popular book written by Chris Anderson, argued that hit-driven culture would devolve into niches and become “massively parallel." Webster has found that cultural consumption remains concentrated on a relatively small number of mainstream outlets, with much audience duplication among all outlets. He argued that the persistence of popular offerings and high levels of duplication were producing a “massively overlapping culture.” Two of Webster’s students published an analysis of global internet use suggesting that the Great Firewall was not responsible for isolating Chinese web users. In 2015, the International Communication Association, named it the best article of the year. In collaboration with those same colleagues, Webster adapted the concept of flow to digital media, to argue that unseen architectures of choice “nudge” the flow of attention on the internet.

=== Audience theory ===
Media researchers commonly believe that audience behavior is best explained by micro-level factors such as individual preferences. In a 1983 article, “A theory of television program choice,” Webster claimed that preferences were expressed within the structure of available program options and that these structures were important determinants of audience behavior. By the early twentieth-first century the widespread use of digital media, which seemed to empower people, rejuvenated the idea that individual preferences drove audience behavior. In “The duality of media,” Webster adapted structuration theory to argue that macro-level structural factors were still critical in shaping patterns of public attention to digital media. In 2012, the "duality" article won the Denis McQuail Award for best article advancing communication theory. The fullest expression of his theory of audience behavior is in The Marketplace of Attention, which won the 2015 Robert G. Picard Book Award.

=== Audience analysis ===
Webster has also written extensively about measurement and the analysis of audience data. Ratings Analysis, first published in 1991, is in its fourth edition and is a standard text on audience measurement and analytics. Starting in 2010, Webster and his students began using social network analysis to study audience behavior. Their approach, which uses data on audience duplication to build “audience networks", has been adopted by others to study news consumption and international audience formation.
