= Shanghai Science Association for Young Talents =

Shanghai Science Association for Young Talents (SSAYT) is a non-government organization for Shanghai adolescents in their scientific and technological development, supported by CASTIC, approved by Shanghai Civil Affairs Bureau and governed by SASTIC. SSAYT has grown up to a professional and mutual scientific education institute via three plans, Science Seeds Plan, Science Buddy Plan as well as Science Gardener Plan, making full use of abundant science education resources from more than 200 societies, associations and institutions, modeling a novel system which operated by market with leadership of government. Undertaking part of public functions from government, SSAYT raised cooperation with more than 30 societies and institutes and organizations abroad, improved under references from their advanced management experiences.

SSAYT has flourished to an association with 9 district branches, 21 school branches and one society branch so that to nurture science and technology innovation talents of students members ranging from interest membership, creation membership, research membership. talent membership and senior membership. Member students of SSAYT reached an awarded-rate as high as 90% in all kinds of contests home and abroad. At the meantime, SSAYT organized a variety of public-good events and activities with schools, educational institutes, science museums, enterprises from different districts and different cities annually.

In order to foster students’ comprehensive abilities in scientific research, SSAYT executes three plans, Science Seeds Plan, Science Buddy Plan as well as Science Gardener Plan.

== Science Seeds Plan ==
Science Seeds Plan is launched to focus on the cultivation of innovative talents. It offers students courses that are developed under the guidance of STEM education along with in the form of PBL (project-based learning) to promote interdisciplinary study and to nurture talents with innovation ability. These courses cover the shortage of which most primary schools and middle schools lack. Meanwhile, SSAYT implements a membership system, which offers students classified and specialized tutoring to meet different interests, needs as well as personal comprehensive abilities of students. They are interest, intern, research, senior and talent membership.

== Science Buddy Plan ==
A long and steady development of a country lies in the culture of science and technology innovation ability for young talents. Therefore, SSAYT carries out Science Buddy Plan to undertake governmental social responsibilities of science popularization and public goods promotion. It contains a variety of science popularization events, public science education events and theme-oriented study, speeches, outdoor activities.

== Science Gardener Plan ==
In addition, SSAYT executes Science Gardener Plan, which is designed to hold workshops, seminars and trainings for teachers. It aims to build an effective and outstanding platform for the communication among them and for the exhibition of their achievements in science and teaching. More profoundly, the implementation of the plan makes benefits for adolescent science education.

== Activities ==
Based on the three plans, SSAYT now has united national and international science education resources from schools, scientific institutes, corporations and other social powers into its own development via on-line science education such as its own website of Shanghai Adolescents’ Science and Technology Innovation (www.shssp.org) and on-line platform, Shanghai STEM cloud center, as well as off-line activities, hands-on outreaches and contests home and abroad for adolescents so that to upgrade their scientific research abilities. As a result, members of SSAYT perform excellently not only in Shanghai regional contest but also in national and international contests. The award rate is as high as 90% in all kinds of contests.

Nowadays, Chinese government has been shrinking administration ranges to make more space for social power development. It boosts development of social organizations to cultivate science and technology innovation ability for young talents in basic units in various regions. As a result, SSAYT is committed to be a pioneer in the work of science education for Shanghai as well as Chinese adolescents.
