= Salem Radio Network =

American radio network

- Type: Radio network
- Country: United States

Ownership
- Owner: Salem Media Group

History
- Launch date: 2009

Coverage
- Availability: National, through regional affiliates

Links
- Website: www.srnonline.com

Salem Radio Network is a United States–based radio network that specializes in syndicated Christian political talk, music, and conservative secular news/talk programming. It is a division of the Salem Media Group.

== Network information ==
Salem Radio Network was launched in 2009, and operates on mostly four radio formats: Christian talk and teaching (transmitted on AM in some areas and on FM in others), Contemporary Christian music (transmitted mostly on FM stations), conservative News/Talk format (transmitted on AM stations), and Christian Teaching (transmitted on AM stations).

Contemporary Christian Music is transmitted full-time on most stations, but in areas where Salem has a limited number of stations it is transmitted only part-time in morning and afternoon drive times on weekdays and weekend afternoons. Where Salem only has one FM station (WAVA-FM in Washington, D.C., and WORD-FM in Pittsburgh), CCM is transmitted on weekends, with talk and teaching on weekdays. Most CCM stations play music full-time and do not sell blocks of time to religious organizations except sometimes on Sunday mornings. Educational Media Foundation entered into an agreement to purchase this network at the end of 2024, taking effect upon closure of the deal in 2025.

Christian Talk, comprising talk shows where listeners call in and participate in the show, is transmitted during weekdays in some areas, and only in drive times in others. The rest of the day is filled with blocks of time ranging from a few minutes to an hour sold to churches and Christian organizations.

Conservative Talk, branded in most markets as "The Answer" since 2014, transmits full-time on a commercial basis. These stations only sell advertisement time, not blocks of time like Christian Talk counterparts–though brokered programming may be offered on weekends, as secular stations often do. Some of these stations have religious programs on Sunday mornings.

The teaching format relies on selling blocks of time to organizations full-time. These stations offer diverse religious features such as church services, political and religious interview features, Christian family life programs, and children's shows. Music–exclusively Christian–is only transmitted by a few of these stations at times during the weekend.

== Programming ==
The company's Salem Radio Network subsidiary produces several talk radio shows and a 24-hour news service that are distributed to hundreds of radio affiliates around the country.

=== Weekdays ===
- O'Connor & Company (6 to 9 a.m. ET)
- Mike Gallagher (9 a.m. to 12 p.m.)
- Alex Marlow (12 to 1 p.m.)
- Scott Jennings (1 to 3 p.m.)
- Hugh Hewitt (3 to 6 p.m.)
- Larry Elder (6 to 9 p.m.)
- Cal Thomas (short-form commentary)
- Dennis Prager (recovering from fall)
- Jerry Stewart's One Moment in America (short-form commentary)

=== Weekends ===
- Townhall.com Weekend Journal and Townhall.com Week in Review
- Bill Gaither's Homecoming
- Kinder Outdoors
- Armed American Radio
- The Forever Young Radio Show
- The World and Everything in It
- Steve Brown Etc.
- The Christian Outlook
- EggMan Ronnie James (multiple shows) (limited syndication)

The satellite feed for Salem's general market programming can be heard on the CRN Digital Talk Radio Networks, on CRN3.

=== List of local Christian talk radio shows ===
List of Salem Media local Christian Talk Radio Shows
Location	Station	Name	Hosts	Website
Atlanta	WNIV 970 and WDWD 590	Faith Talk Live	Dan Ratcliffe and Rick Probst	faithtalk970.com
Chicago	WYLL 1160	The Common Good	Brian From and Aubrey Sampson	1160hope.com
Columbus	WRFD 880 & FM 104.5	Bob Burney Live	Bob Burney	thewordcolumbus.com
Denver	KRKS-FM 94.7	Cross Walk	Gino Geraci	947fmtheword.com
Detroit	WLQV 1500 & FM 92.7	Run To Win	Darryl Wood	faithtalkdetroit.com
Los Angeles and San Diego	KKLA-FM 99.5, KPRZ 1210 & FM 106.1	Southern California Live		kprz.com
Minneapolis	KKMS 980	Cross Walk	Lee Michaels	am980themission.com
New York City	WMCA 570 & FM 102.3	Kevin McCullough Radio	Kevin McCullough	am570themission.com
Oxnard	KDAR-FM 98.3	Community Connection	David Cruz and Brian Toohey	fmtheword.com
Philadelphia	WFIL 560	The Tim DemossS how	Tim DeMoss	wfil.com
Phoenix	KPXQ 1360	The Form Show	Marc Lucas	faithtalk1360.com
Phoenix	KPXQ 1360	Messy Marriages	Marc Lucas	faithtalk1360.com
Pittsburgh	WORD-FM 101.5	The Ride Home	John Hall and Kathy Emmons	wordfm.com
Portland	KPDQ-FM 93.9	The Georgene Rice Show	Georgene Rice	kpdq.com
Portland	KPDQ 800 & KPDQ-FM 93.9	Difference Makers	Mike Lee	truetalk800.com
San Francisco	KFAX 1100	Life Line With Craig Robert	Craig Roberts	kfax.com
Seattle	KGNW 820 & FM 104.1	Live From Seattle	Tim Gaydos	thewordseattle.com
Tampa	WTBN 570 & WTWD 910, WLSS 930	The Bill Bunkley Show	Bill Bunkley	letstalkfaith.com
Washington, D.C.	WAVA-FM 105.1	The Don Kroah Show	Don Kroah	wava.com

=== List of contemporary Christian music stations ===
The Salem Radio Network contemporary Christian music (CCM) stations are referred to as TheFISH. In 2025, Educational Media Foundation purchased the stations, along with the TheFISH intellectual properties, with intent to assimilate them into their own competing Air1 and K-Love networks.

Salem Media News Talk station
Station	FM Frequency	City
WTOH-HD2	95.9	Columbus

=== List of Christian teaching radio programs ===
The following is a list of Salem Radio Christian teaching radio programs:

- Allen Jackson Ministries
- A New Beginning
- Christian Advocates Serving Evangelism
- Destined for Victory
- Discovering the Jewish Jesus
- Dr. James Dobson's Family Talk
- Family Life Ministries
- Focus on the Family
- Gospel in Life
- Grace to You
- Harvest Ministries
- Haven Ministries
- Hope for the Heart
- In Touch Ministries
- Insight for Living
- Jay Sekulow
- Key Life
- Know the Truth
- Leading the Way
- Living on the Edge
- Love Worth Finding
- Ministry in the Marketplace
- New Life Ministries
- Pastor Rick's Daily Hope
- Pathway to Victory
- PowerPoint Ministries
- Real Life Radio
- Sekulow
- Shalom Ministries International
- Somebody Loves You Radio
- The Alliance of Confessing Evangelicals
- The FLOT Line
- The Grace Message
- The Lutheran Hour
- The Narrow Path
- The Urban Alternative
- The Voice of the Martyrs
- Thru the Bible
- Truth for Life
- Turning Point for God
- Unlimited Grace
- Winning Walk Family
- World Missionary Evangelism
- Worship & the Word

=== List of conservative talk radio programs ===
List of Salem Radio Local Conservative Talk Radio Programs
City	Show	Host	Station	Website
Chicago	Chicago's Morning Answer	Dan Proft	WIND 560	560theanswer.com
Chicago	The Shaun Thompson Show	Shaun Thompson	WIND 560	989theanswer.com
Cleveland	Always Right with Bob Frantz	Bob Frantz	WHK 1420 & FM 102.5	989theanswer.com
Columbus	The Bruce Hooley Show	Bruce Hooley	WHK 1420 & FM 102.5	989theanswer.com
Dallas	The Mark Davis Show	Mark Davis	KSKY 660	660amtheanswer.com
Denver	The George Brauchler Show	George Brauchler	KNUS 710	710knus.com
Denver	The Peter Boyles Show	Peter Boyles	KNUS 710	710knus.com
Denver	The Steffan Tubbs Show	Steffan Tubbs	KNUS 710	710knus.com
Detroit	6 O'clock Talk with Darryl Wood	Darryl Wood	WDTK 1400 & FM 101.5	patriotdetroit.com
Greenville	The Morning Answer	Joey Hudson	WGTK-FM 94.5	945theanswer.com
Honolulu	The Mike Buck Show	Mike Buck	KHNR 690 & FM 94.3	theanswerhawaii.com
Houston	The Sam Malone Show	Sam Malone	KHNR 690 & FM 94.3	am1070theanswer.com
Little Rock	The Dave Elswick Show	Dave Elswick	KDXE-FM 101.1	1011fmtheanswer.com
Los Angeles	The Morning Answer	Jennifer Horn & Grant Stinchfield	KRLA 870 & KTIE 590	am590theanswer.com
New York	Radio Night Live with Kevin McCullough	Kevin McCullough	WNYM 970	am970theanswer.com
New York	The Joe Piscopo Show	Joe Piscopo	WNYM 970	am970theanswer.com
Philadelphia	Philadelphia's Morning Answer	Chris Stigall	WNTP 990	990theanswer.com
Phoenix	The Seth Liebsohn Show	Seth Leibsohn	KKNT 960	960thepatriot.com
Pittsburgh	The John Steigerwald Show	John Steigerwald	WPGP 1250 & FM 92.5	theanswerpgh.com
Sacramento	The Phil Cowan Show	Phil Cowan	KTKZ 1380	am1380theanswer.com
San Bernardino	Inland Empire Answer	Don Dix	KTIE 590	theanswersandiego.com
San Diego	The Andrea Kaye Show	Andrea Kaye	KCBQ 1170 & FM 96.1	theanswersandiego.com
San Diego	The Pro America Report	Ed Martin	KCBQ 1170 & FM 96.1	theanswersandiego.com

== Network properties ==
=== Over-the-air networks ===
==== Salem Music Network ====
Salem Music Network is a division of SRN which operates three networks for the use of over-the-air stations. These feeds are mostly for stations in small and mid-size markets or HD Radio sub-channel use. The networks are distributed through both audio over IP and satellite.

Unlike other major radio networks, SRN's broadcast clock does not include a top-of-the-hour newscast, though four local insertion opportunities and a station identification spot are provided.

Network	Format	Reference
Singing News Radio (Formerly Solid Gospel)	Southern Gospel Music	
The Word in Praise	Traditional Worship Music	
The Answer (General Market Talk)	Conservative Talk	
FamilyTalk	Christian Talk	

= Available through terrestrial radio affiliates.
= Available exclusively via SiriusXM.

== See also ==
- Lee Habeeb
- Phil Boyce
