= Voice-tracking =

Process of prerecording radio announcer segments in a disc jockey shift

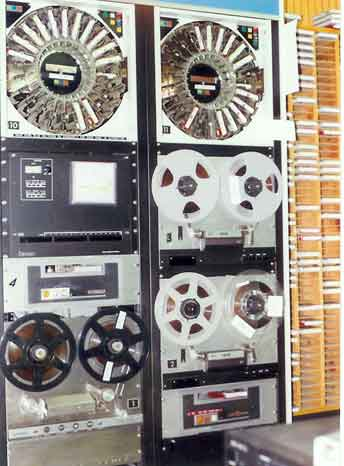
An old-fashioned automation system capable of voice-tracking. Contemporary systems are entirely computer-based.

Voice-tracking, also called cyber jocking and referred to sometimes colloquially as a robojock, is a technique employed by some radio stations in radio broadcasting to produce the illusion of a live disc jockey or announcer sitting in the radio studios of the station when one is not actually present. It is one of the notable effects of radio homogenization.

== Background ==
Voice-tracking refers to the process of a disc jockey prerecording their on-air "patter". It is then combined with songs, commercials, and other elements in order to produce a product sounding like a live air shift. Voice-tracking has become common on many music radio stations, particularly during evening, overnight, weekend, and holiday time periods. Most radio station owners consider it an economical alternative to employing live disc jockeys around the clock.

The process goes back decades and was very common on FM stations in the 1970s. At that time, elements were recorded on reel-to-reel magnetic tapes and broadcast cartridges and played by specialized professional audio equipment. It has become more controversial recently as computer technology permits the process to be more flexible and less expensive, allowing for fewer station employees and an effective illusion of live, local programming. With the repeal of the Federal Communications Commission's Main Studio Rule in 2017, these studios have begun to be shut down, and a station can be centralcast from a radio group's headquarters thousands of miles away with the only localization occurring with weather forecasts, local news (if even broadcast) and local advertising.

Most contemporary broadcast automation systems at music stations effectively function as high-tech jukeboxes. Pieces of audio footage are digitized as computer files and saved on one or more hard drives, or stored off-site through a company's cloud computing system. Station personnel create "program logs" which list exactly what is supposed to be on the air and in what order. The computer follows the instructions set out in the playlist.

== Variations ==
In some cases, voice-tracking is done to give station employees the flexibility to carry out other responsibilities. For example, a DJ may also have managerial duties as a program director or general manager. Voice-tracking allows that person to record a three-hour air shift in considerably less time, freeing them up to do office work. Alternatively, a popular live weekday morning host can record voice tracks throughout the week for a Saturday show, allowing them to be on the air six days a week without extra physical presence each Saturday.

Companies housing more than one station can use the technique to stretch out their air staff. For example, the live midday disc jockey on a country station can then record voice tracks for the overnight shift of the sister rock station (often using a different name).

Some "cyber jocks" provide voice-tracking services for several different radio syndication stations (and in several radio formats), sometimes affiliates located hundreds of miles away from each other that are all part of a radio network.

One notorious form of voice-tracking involves using out-of-market talent. In this form, the station contracts with a disc jockey in another city (often employed by the same corporation, but sometimes as a freelancer). The outsider will add local color using information provided by the station and news stories gleaned from newspapers available on the Internet. The recorded voice tracks are then sent to the station. DJs of this style often make a point of trying to sound as local as possible, sometimes going so far as falsely claiming to have visited a local landmark or attended a station's promotional event. However, sometimes the DJ has actually been to the location, or monitored the event online and can speak with knowledge about it without making a claim to having been there that day, although it may be implied.

One type of use is to provide smaller-market radio stations with a polished, "big city" sound using experienced disc jockeys from larger cities who can produce content quicker than younger or less-experienced (often local) talent.

Others may prefer to use smaller market talent (who are paid less than their counterparts in major markets) to voice-track on their larger stations, thus eliminating the need for higher-paid air talent in the larger markets. See the "controversy" section below for more.

A common example of voice-tracking technology is a DJ recording their voice over the end of one track and into the beginning of another. These tracks (with the voice transition covering the end of one and the start of the next) are then played on air to give the listener the effect of a live show. This and other similar work can often be done remotely with the cyber jock able to plug directly into the station's automated system. Time checks are often interspersed to further the perception of a live show.

These and similar techniques, like prerecorded time checks, greatly add to perception that a show is being broadcast live. When used correctly the average listener and even professionals may not be able to tell the difference between a live and a prerecorded show.

== Formatics ==
Different radio stations want their DJs to speak only at certain times, so cyber jocks have to be made aware of each station's rules and broadcast clock. What follows is an example.

At example station ZZZZ, the DJs have to follow certain rules within its clock. These are called formatics. Armed with the knowledge of these rules, the clock, and with the station's music log, the cyber jock can recreate what the finished radio program should sound like.

- DJs have to backsell (or give the title and artist of a song played previously) three songs before playing the commercials at 22 minutes past the hour
- DJs have to read or play a pre-recorded weather forecast at 44 minutes past the hour
- DJs have to play the station's legally required identification near the top of the hour
- DJs are allowed to speak only over the song's instrumental portion at the beginning

As an example, see the following graphic:

As song one begins to fade out the next song begins. In this case, the DJ does not start talking until the second song starts, and they stop at the point that the song's vocals start. This interval is called an intro, ramp, or post. This is the most common method. If the cyber jock knows the song that their voice will be played over, they know how much time they have until they have to stop talking to avoid talking over the vocals of the song. If they time their speech correctly, they will do just that. DJs call this "Pegging the Post" or "hitting the post".

If the station employs other methods of doing this, the cyber jock should be familiar with them, and can alter their speech and timing to accommodate them or use software to adjust the speed of their natural voice to fit the ramp and hit the post. Cyber jocks can also listen to tapes of other people on the station to get an idea of the overall sound the station is working toward.

== Controversy ==
Voice-tracking has been a hotly contested issue within radio circles. Opponents of the concept argue that voice-tracking makes radio stations lose their sense of locality, especially when a station employs a disc jockey who has never set foot in that station's town and does not understand local culture and happenings. An example is locations with unusual names or pronunciations; if an out-of-market disc jockey cannot pronounce the name of a fairly common location in the market (for instance, a common barometer in the Milwaukee market is the proper pronunciation of the suburban community of Oconomowoc), it is considered a dead giveaway that the jockey is voice-tracked from elsewhere. Because of this, out-of-market DJs will often avoid making references to local information to avoid any possible faux pas. Some DJs will be trained to pronounce location names or will be briefed on local news and events in the area they are serving. There is also concern about voice-tracking taking away job opportunities and providing fewer opportunities for aspiring disc jockeys.

Supporters of voice-tracking argue that a professional presentation on the air by an outsider is preferable to using a local DJ who may not provide a similar level of quality or standards. Outside radio circles, regular listeners may prefer the newer sound, may not tell that there is not a live disc jockey, and may not care about voice-tracking once informed about it. Additionally, the cost savings gleaned from judicious use of voice-tracking could potentially help keep a struggling station afloat, therefore saving the jobs of those at the station and ensuring the area still has the local radio station at all.

Since voice-tracking is designed to work without human intervention, stations using the process may have no one in the building at all outside of business hours. However, a station manager can often log into the station's main computer system from home (or other remote location) in certain instances, such as if a song track is not working properly. Malfunctions in the automation equipment or programming after hours, resulting in dead air or a continuous repeating loop, can go on for hours before being corrected by management.

Another concern is how to alert the public in the event of emergencies, such as natural disaster alerts, shelter-in-place notices, or evacuation warnings. In these cases, other automated systems come into play. Emergency Alert System equipment is programmed to automatically break into whatever is playing and deliver information to the listener, usually using audio from a local government weather radio service. Often if severe weather conditions are known, a live person is on-call to stay at the station and transmit details about the situation. For other stations, a news sharing agreement with a television station allows them to carry the audio of a television station during a breaking news or weather situation, allowing warning of the events without the costs of hiring extra staff.
