= Free (Anderson book) =

2009 economics book by Chris Anderson

Free: The Future of a Radical Price
- Hardcover edition
- Author: Chris Anderson
- Language: English
- Subject: Pricing, e-commerce
- Genre: Non-fiction
- Publisher: Hyperion
- Publication date: July 7, 2009
- Publication place: United States
- Pages: 288 pp.
- ISBN: 978-1401322908
- Preceded by: The Long Tail
- Followed by: Makers

Free: The Future of a Radical Price is the second book written by Chris Anderson, editor-in-chief of Wired magazine. The book was published on July 7, 2009, by Hyperion. Free is Anderson's follow-up to his book The Long Tail, published in 2006.

== Overview ==
Free follows a thread from the previous work. It examines the rise of pricing models which give products and services to customers for free, often as a strategy for attracting users and up-selling some of them to a premium level. That class of model has become widely referred to as "freemium" and has become very popular for a variety of digital products and services.

== Release ==
Free was released in the United States on July 7, 2009, though the night before, on his blog, Chris Anderson posted a browser readable version of the book and the unabridged audiobook version. Anderson generated controversy for plagiarizing content from the online encyclopedia Wikipedia in Free. Anderson responded to the claim on his The Long Tail blog, stating that there were disagreements between him and the publisher over accurate citation of Wikipedia due to the changing nature of its content, leading him to integrate footnotes into the text. Also on his blog, he took full responsibility for the mistakes and noted that the digital editions of Free were corrected. The notes and sources were later provided as a download on his blog.

== Reception ==
Despite the controversy, the $29.99 hard copy version of Free debuted at #12 on the New York Times Best Seller List. It was also available as a free download for a limited time, and 200,000 to 300,000 digital versions were downloaded in the first two weeks. The unabridged audiobook remains free, while the abridged version costs $7.49.

In a review in The New Yorker, Canadian journalist Malcolm Gladwell roundly criticized the book's premise. Anderson responded online on his blog at Wired.com and on PBS's Charlie Rose show. The book was also reviewed in the New York Times and the Wall Street Journal.

== See also ==
- Cost the limit of price
