= Lilian Katz =

Early childhood education academic

Lilian Gonshaw Katz (born 1932) is a professor emerita of early childhood education at the University of Illinois at Urbana–Champaign, where she is also principal investigator for the Illinois Early Learning Project, and a contributor to the Early Childhood and Parenting Collaborative. She founded two journals: Early Childhood Research Quarterly for which she served as editor-in-chief during its first six years, and Early Childhood Research & Practice the first on-line peer-reviewed early-childhood journal for which she remains editor-in-chief. Her scholarly work focused on the developmental stages of a teacher, child social development, and she has been a proponent of the project-based learning approach to childhood education, believing children learn best in informal and interactive situations.

She was born and raised in England, moving to the United States in 1947. She graduated from Wilson High School in Los Angeles in 1950 (voted "Most Likely to Succeed"), briefly attended Whittier College until 1952, married and gave birth to three children, returned to college in 1962 at San Francisco State College, received her BA in 1964, and then earned a PhD in child development from Stanford University in 1968. That same year, she took on the position of assistant professor of early childhood education at the University of Illinois at Urbana–Champaign, where she remained throughout her academic career. She was the recipient of two Fulbright awards (India and New Zealand) and in 1997 she served as Nehru Professor at the University of Baroda in India. Katz was awarded an honorary Doctor of Letters (Litt.D.) degree from Whittier College in 1993.

Katz is a past president of the National Association for the Education of Young Children and former director of the ERIC Clearinghouse on Elementary & Early Childhood Education. She has published Talks with Teachers of Young Children (1995), a collection of her essays. In 2001 the second edition of her Engaging Children's Minds: The Project Approach (with S. C. Chard) was published. She is currently chair of the editorial board of the International Journal of the Early Years published in the United Kingdom. The Clearinghouse on Early Education and Parenting (CEEP) organized a symposium in her honor in 2000.

== See also ==
- Reggio Emilia approach

== Bibliography ==
- Helm, J. H., & Katz, L. G. (2001). Young investigators: The project approach in the early years. New York: Teachers College Press. (ERIC Document No. ED448856)
- Katz, L. G. (1977). Ethical issues in working with young children. Champaign, IL: ERIC Clearinghouse on Elementary and Early Childhood Education. (ERIC Document No. ED144681)
- Katz, L. G. (1995). Talks with teachers of young children: A collection. Norwood, NJ: Ablex. (ERIC Document No. ED380232)
- Katz, L. G., & Chard, S. C. (1989). Engaging children's minds: The project approach. Norwood, NJ: Ablex. (ERIC Document No. ED407074)
- Katz, L. G., & Chard, S. C. (2000). Engaging children's minds: The project approach (2nd ed.). Stamford, CT: JAI Press. (ED456892)
