= Social polarization =

Segregation of society into different social groups

Social polarization is the segregation within a society that emerges when factors such as income inequality, real-estate fluctuations and economic displacement result in the differentiation of social groups from high-income to low-income. It is a state and/or a tendency denoting the growth of groups at the extremities of the social hierarchy and the parallel shrinking of groups around its middle.

An early body of research on social polarization was conducted by R.E. Pahl on the Isle of Sheppey, in which he provided a comparison between a pre-capitalist society and capitalist society.

More recently, a number of research projects have been increasingly addressing the issues of social polarization within the developed economies. When social polarization occurs in addition to economic restructuring, particularly in cities, economic inequality along social class and racial lines is exacerbated. Such separation can be best observed in the urban environment, "where [communities] of extreme wealth and social power are interspersed with places of deprivation, exclusion, and decline."

In addition to how spatial compositions are managed in cities, the technologies used in regards to social relations can also contribute to social polarization (see § Role of media).

Increased spatial segregation of socioeconomic groups correlates strongly with social polarization as well as social exclusion and societal fragmentation.

== Creative class ==
Aspects of this concept can also be associated with the phenomena of the creative class and how these members have created their own dominant status within society. Globalization and its associated "creative destruction" has contributed to great prosperity and growth for elites in many cities. Conversely, the process of creative destruction is intrinsically spatially uneven, so some urban neighborhoods "at the receiving end" of globalization are harmed by it.

== Urban poverty ==
Several theoretical models can be strung together to explain the basics that create social polarization, and the subsequent deprivation that occurs when there is extreme societal deprivation between those of high-wealth and low-wealth. They are:

- a Culture of Poverty
- a Cycle of Poverty
- Government Failure—particularly when public policy institutions divided into departments (education, housing, etc.) are ineffective when it comes to dealing with the interdisciplinary problems of the poor
- an Inequitable Distribution of Resources/Opportunities
- Class Conflict, and
- the concept of an "Underclass".

When these phenomena are combined in urban areas, it can fuel social polarization. Urban decay is a visual manifestation of social polarization, while riots, civil commotion and general social disintegration can be symptomatic of this concept as well.

However, it can also lead to an informal economy in many urban areas.

== Role of media ==
Digital media, and particularly social media, could potentially play a role in encouraging social polarization. This is because social media sites like Facebook can help cluster friends and acquaintances into homophilous circles, and social news sites like Digg can facilitate a consumption of news that is biased by its user's choices. In the extreme, a lack of "a common public sphere" could lead to isolated, polarized groups which could even be hostile towards one another. For example, during the Arab Spring uprisings, it was observed that social media furthered the social stratification already present in several Arab states.

Likewise, traditional media coverage may inadvertently foster social polarization in social networks—particularly, online social networks—by causing people to alter their social ties. Simulation models and social media data show that people tend to lose social ties to friends of the opposite political ideology when news coverage differs greatly between news sources of opposite political lean, i.e., a polarized information ecosystem. This can occur even if people do not know their friends' political leanings, as people are reacting to the behavior of friends in relation to the news: your friends' behavior can seem out of sync if they are tuned into different news outlets than you and are thus consuming very different news coverage. Thus, polarized news coverage may cause people to unknowingly sort their social networks along political lines, thereby fostering social polarization.

However, cyberbalkanization, the phenomenon where media audiences fragment into "enclaves" where they only consume content they concur with—and thus theoretically promoting social polarization—may not have as much influence as believed. Utilizing Nielsen television and Internet audience data, James G. Webster found that ideological segmentation among media users was unlikely, as "even consumers of obscure niche media devoted most of their attention to more broadly appealing fare."

Yet Webster does admit that his research does not measure the particular nature of the subject matter consumed, or how strongly it affected the media viewers' perceptions of society.

Polarization observed in a particular social media site need not necessarily be a result of events and discussions that happen on that platform. Observed trends of polarization in online social media may therefore emerge from activities of users in other online platforms or offline activities. As an instance from a 2019 study, messages propagating anti-climate change beliefs on Twitter were collectively found to carry no credibility. Hence it is highly unlikely that such messages which are not credible can increase polarization of climate change opinions on Twitter.

== See also ==
- Balkanization
- Corporate social responsibility (CSR)
- Creating Shared Value (CSV)
- Culture war
- Economic democracy
- Pakistanism
- Protracted social conflict
- Political polarization
- Sectarian violence
- Social enterprise
- Social exclusion
