= Audience memory curve =

The audience memory curve summarizes research on what an ordinary presentation audience is most likely to remember from the presenter's messages. The audience memory curve is important when planning effective corporate communication.

The audience memory curve is a principle that relates to the amount of information a person is able to retain and remember from a presentation depending on the time that the information is presented. “Researchers have found that people have a ‘memory curve’ which enables them to recall what is presented or spoken in the beginning or end of the presentation and not much of what is presented or spoken in the middle of the presentation”. Although an audience may attempt to listen to all of the data, examples, facts, and opinions in a presentation, the reality of the situation is that they can only take in and recall a small portion of what is said. The audience's attention tends to be high when a presentation begins, but as it continues, the audience's attentions may wander. Some people may tune in and out, others may daydream or become distracted. However, when a presenter nears the end of their speech with a phrase such as ‘to wrap up’ or ‘in conclusion’, most audience members tune back in and listen intently attempting to find out what they had missed along the way. The audience memory curve principle is especially important when it comes to communication techniques. Understanding how this principle works is necessary to delivering a memorable and successful presentation.

== Ebbinghaus forgetting curve ==
When discussing the principle of the audience memory curve, it is worth noting the more well-known Ebbinghaus forgetting curve. This curve describes the decreased ability of the brain to retain memory over time. Ebbinghaus found the forgetting curve to be exponential in nature. “Memory retention is 100% at the time of learning any particular piece of information. However, it drops rapidly to 40% within the first few days “. Understanding Ebbinghaus’ forgetting curve is important when discussing the audience memory curve because Ebbinghaus also described the various factors that can affect the rate of forgetting, which is useful when discussing ways to combat decreasing interest of an audience during a presentation. These factors include the meaningfulness of the information, the way it is represented, and physiological factors, such as stress and sleep.

== Strategy ==
In communication strategy, it is important to use direct approach in the beginning of a presentation. This is where the audience remembers most of the ideas presented. Use and deliver ideas in descending importance order. Leave the second most important message to last. If indirect approach is used then the ending of the presentation should conclude the main idea as a solution.

There are a variety of techniques to battle the waning attention of an audience. According to Dr. Carmen Simon, the first step in giving an effective presentation is gaining the audience's attention. True attention requires overcoming habituation. According to Simon, habituation is “when you get used to stimulus and start paying less and less attention to it”. Overcoming habituation relies on stimulus internal variation, which Simon refers to as “a fancy way of saying ‘the degree of change over time’” McGee). We tend to pay more attention to things that change, and ignore things that stay the same. Applying this information to a presentation means using more ‘cuts’ in the presentation. In other words, switching up the type of content and presentation style. Another way of overcoming habituation and gathering attention is the neurotransmitter dopamine. Dopamine deals with pleasure and reward. “’When dopamine is present, your audience may be more likely to exert some effort in your favor,’ Simon said, ‘even if it is just paying attention to you’”. The key to releasing dopamine is the anticipation of pleasure. Anticipation can be incorporated into a presentation in several ways including promising a reward to the audience or stating that you will need audience participation at some point.

The audience memory curve is an important principle to understand in order to better communicate and present information to an audience. Understanding how people retain and connect with information will help a presented to take control of what an audience takes away from their presentation and is a huge skill to have as a presenter.

== See also ==
- Audience theory
