= Makers: The New Industrial Revolution =

2012 book by Chris Anderson

- Hardcover edition
- Author: Chris Anderson
- Language: English
- Subject: New industrial revolution
- Genre: Non-fiction
- Publisher: Crown Business
- Publication date: October 2, 2012
- Publication place: United States
- Media type: Print, e-book, audiobook
- Pages: 272
- ISBN: 978-0307720955
- Preceded by: Free
- Followed by: TBA

Makers: The New Industrial Revolution is the third book written by Chris Anderson, Editor in chief of Wired magazine. The book was published on October 2, 2012, by Crown Business. He is also the author of The Long Tail, published in 2006. Makers focuses on a new industrial revolution as modern entrepreneurs, using open source design and 3-D printing, bring manufacturing to the desktop.

The book is largely based on his 2010 article, "In the Next Industrial Revolution, Atoms Are the New Bits". The ideas he portrayed, such as crowdsourcing of ideas, utilization of available lower-cost design and manufacturing tools, and reviewing options to outsource capital-intensive manufacturing were highlighted in the February 2010 Harvard Business Review article, "From Do It Yourself to Do It Together".

== Overview ==
We’re now entering the third industrial revolution, Anderson said. The first one, which began with the spinning jenny in 1776, doubled the human life span and set population soaring. From the demographic perspective, "it’s as if nothing happened before the Industrial Revolution."

The next revolution was digital. Formerly industrial processes like printing were democratized with desktop publishing. The "cognitive surplus" of formerly passive consumers was released into an endless variety of personal creativity. Then distribution was democratized by the Web, which is "scale agnostic and credentials agnostic." Anyone can potentially reach 7 billion people.

The third revolution is digital manufacturing, which combines the gains of the first two revolutions. Factory robots, which anyone can hire, have become general purpose and extremely fast. They allow "lights-out manufacturing," that goes all night and all weekend.

"This will reverse the arrow of globalization," Anderson said. "The centuries of quest for cheaper labor is over. Labor arbitrage no longer drives trade." The advantages of speed and flexibility give the advantage to "locavore" manufacturing because "Closer is faster." Innovation is released from the dead weight of large-batch commitments. Designers now can sit next to the robots building their designs and make adjustments in real time.

— Stewart Brand, longnow.org
