= SteamHead =

Maker-inspired educational nonprofit

- Formation: 2014
- Location: China
- Origin: Shenzhen, China
- Website: SteamHead makerspace

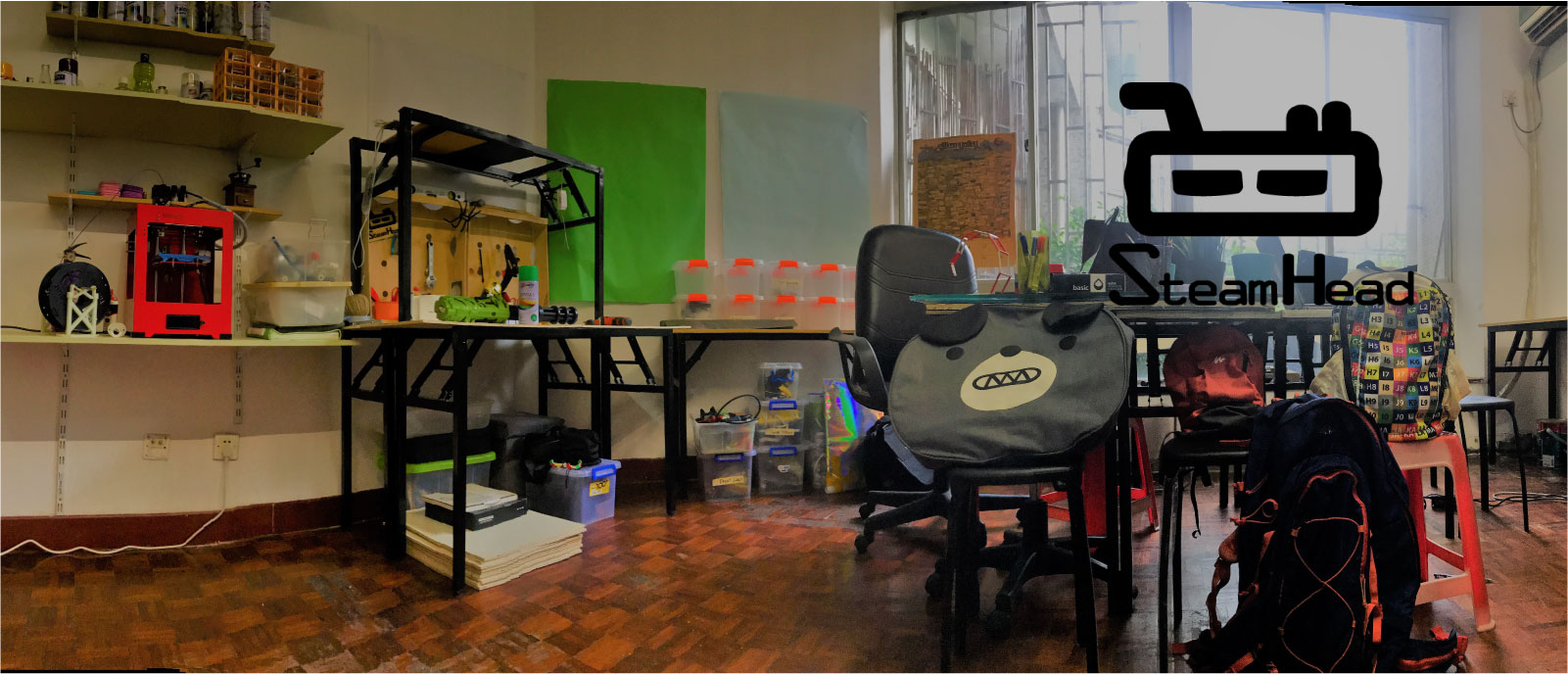
SteamHead's public work tables in Shenzhen, China.

SteamHead is a non-profit organization dedicated to promoting the role of design in education. Inspired by the Maker movement and S.T.E.A.M. education, SteamHead has a mandate to "empower communities through creativity." The organization is supported by sponsors such as the British Council, and local charities and schools in Shenzhen, China.

Founded in 2014 as "The MakerClub" in an apartment, SteamHead has since grown and now operates from offices in the United States and a makerspace in Shenzhen, China. Currently situated in a public space, SteamHead hosts meetings for the Shenzhen Maker Ed community.

== Description ==
SteamHead provides free space for the education community to exchange information, collaborate, and share ideas. It brings together cross-sections of teachers, students, parents, educational industry professionals, hackers, artists, DIY enthusiasts, and educational innovators.

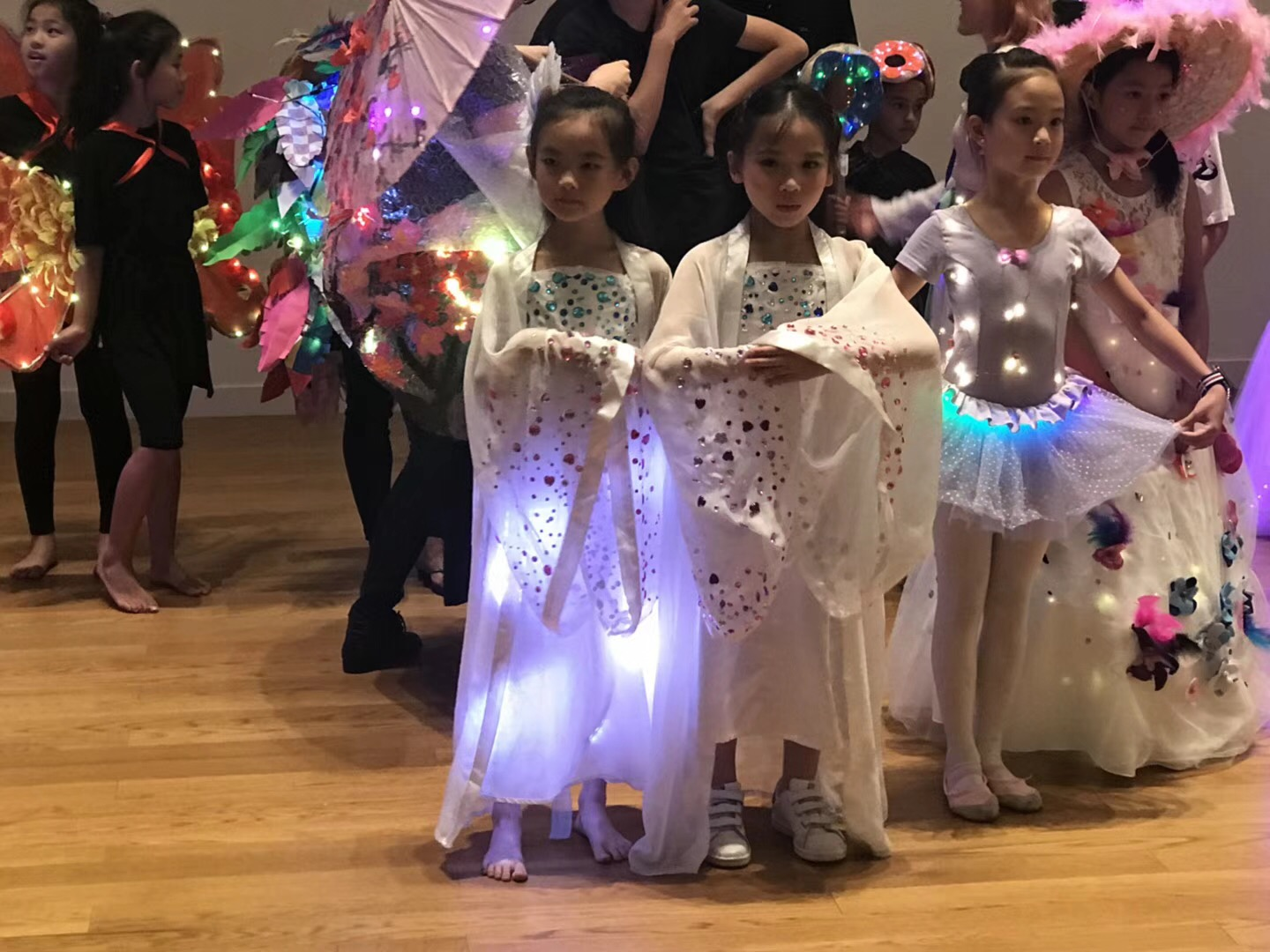
Students from Make Fashion showcasing their designs on the STEAM Runway.

== History ==
SteamHead was established by founding members Benjamin James Simpson, Carrie Leung, Luke Henderson, and Emma Cheung as a hub for educational research and development. As one of the first maker education spaces in Shenzhen, China, SteamHead traces its origins back to 2011, when it organized free language lessons for manufacturing workers in the Fujian and Guangdong provinces of China.

In 2014, the organization began offering science and technology lessons to migrant children in Shenzhen. By 2015, they had partnered with Litchee Lab to create educational programs and workshops. In 2017, SteamHead relocated and established a makerspace in Shenzhen, China.
