= Broadcast programming =

Scheduled radio and television broadcasts

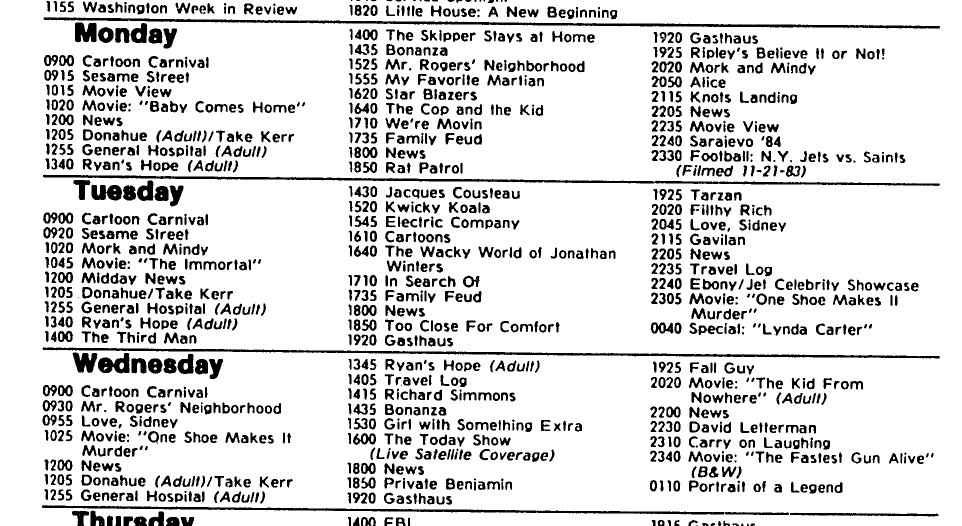
Extract from the American Forces Network TV schedule for December 1983

Broadcast programming is the practice of scheduling broadcast media shows, typically radio and television, in a daily, weekly, monthly, quarterly, or season-long schedule.

Modern broadcasters use broadcast automation to regularly change the scheduling of their shows to build an audience for a new show, retain that audience, or compete with other broadcasters' shows. Most broadcast television shows are presented weekly in prime time or daily in other dayparts, though there are many exceptions.

At a micro level, scheduling is the minute planning of the transmission; what to broadcast and when, ensuring an adequate or maximum utilization of airtime. Television scheduling strategies are employed to give shows the best possible chance of attracting and retaining an audience. They are used to deliver shows to audiences when they are most likely to want to watch them and deliver audiences to advertisers in the composition that makes their advertising most likely to be effective.

With the growth of digital platforms and services allowing non-linear, on-demand access to television content, this approach to broadcasting has since been referred to using the retronym linear (such as linear television and linear channels).

== History ==
With the beginning of scheduled television in 1936, television programming was initially only concerned with filling a few hours each evening – the hours now known as prime time. Over time, though, television began to be seen during the daytime and late at night, as well on the weekends. As air time increased, so did the demand for new material. With the exception of sports television, variety shows became much more important in prime time.

== Scheduling strategies ==
Walk into any of their offices in the networks' skyscraper headquarters on Sixth Avenue in New York (or any advertising agency office on Madison or Park Avenues) and there, prominently displayed either on the wall or beneath a glass desk-top, is the crucial chart mapping hour by hour the rival offerings of ABC, CBS and NBC during prime time. Everyone's thoughts and energies are on juggling the position of their network's programmes in that schedule to maximise the audience. Moves are planned with concentration worthy of an international chess master. Programming for the less lucrative daytime hours is handled by a separate vice-president with his own department.

— Timothy Green, 1972

=== Lead-ins and lead-outs ===
Broadcasters may schedule a program to air before or after a widely viewed tent-pole program, such as a popular series, a special, or a high-profile sporting event, in the hope that audience flow will encourage the audience to tune-in early or stay for the second program. The second program is usually one that the broadcaster wants to promote to a wider audience, such as a new or lower-profile series. Lead-outs are typically chosen to appeal to similar demographics as the program which preceded it, in an effort to retain as much of the audience as possible; for example, Spike TV's scheduling of the mixed martial arts reality series The Ultimate Fighter as a lead-out for the professional wrestling show Monday Night Raw resulted in a 36% increase in viewership in the time slot, with the program retaining 57% of Raw's audience among young adult males. The Super Bowl has a long history of high profile lead-out programming, due to it being regularly one of the highest-rated broadcasts in American television.

In some cases, a lead-in may be an episode of a series that has a tie-in or relevance to the lead-out, such as BBC One scheduling a Doctor Who episode parodying the Eurovision Song Contest as a lead-in for its live broadcast of the 2025 edition. In turn, the episode was also a lead-out for the 2025 FA Cup final; the hammocking of the episode between two live events proved to be risky, as the episode could have been preempted if the FA Cup match went to extra time. However, this did not prove to be the case, and the episode was the third-highest rated program of the night, behind only the FA Cup and Eurovision themselves.

Lead-outs can sometimes help to launch new programs and talent. NBC premiered Late Night in 1982 as a younger-skewing lead-out for its long-running late-night talk show The Tonight Show Starring Johnny Carson. The series helped launch the career of its host David Letterman, and influenced later entries in the genre. Late Night would continue as a franchise with hosts such as Conan O'Brien and Jimmy Fallon—both of whom would later go on to host The Tonight Show.

A weak lead-in can have an impact on the viewership of programs that follow; NBC's 2009 attempt to strip the talk show The Jay Leno Show (a spiritual successor to Leno's tenure of The Tonight Show after Conan O'Brien succeeded him) in a 10:00 p.m. ET/PT timeslot proved detrimental to the viewership of late local newscasts on its affiliates. NBC subsequently announced plans to shorten The Jay Leno Show to a half hour and move it to 11:35 p.m. ET/PT in late-February 2010, displacing The Tonight Show from its traditional timeslot. This proposal led to a public conflict between O'Brien and NBC, and ultimately resulted in his departure from the network, and the reinstatement of Jay Leno as host of The Tonight Show.

This is not always the case: in the 1993–94 season, Fox anticipated that its fantasy western The Adventures of Brisco County Jr. would be the tentpole of its Friday-night lineup. However, its lead-out—the supernatural drama The X-Files–proved to be significantly more successful, and would eventually run for nine seasons as one of Fox's flagship dramas. By contrast, viewership for Brisco County Jr. declined throughout the season, and the show was cancelled. Fox attempted to use other sci-fi shows as a lead-in for The X-Files (such as Sliders and VR.5), but these efforts were similarly unsuccessful.

A type of lead-out popularized by some series is an aftershow—a supplemental talk or magazine show devoted to the preceding program. Targeted towards fans of a series, they usually feature discussion and analysis of its most recent episode, interviews with cast members and celebrity fans of the series, behind-the-scenes features, as well as audience and viewer interactivity. In the United Kingdom, the format was popularized by companion shows for reality series such as Big Brother. In North America, these formats were popularized by networks such as MTV Canada (The After Show), and AMC (such as Talking Dead for The Walking Dead).

=== Blocks ===
Block programming is the practice of scheduling a group of complementary programs together. Blocks are typically built around specific genres (i.e. a block focusing specifically on sitcoms), target audiences, or other factors, with their programming often promoted collectively under blanket titles (such as ABC's "TGIF" lineup and NBC's "Must See TV").

=== Bridging ===
Bridging is the practice of discouraging the audience from changing channels during the "junctions" between specific programs. This can be done, primarily, by airing promos for the next program near the end of the preceding program, such as during its credits, or reducing the length of the junction between two programs as much as possible (hot switching). The host of the next program may similarly make a brief appearance near the end of the preceding program (sometimes interacting directly with the host) to provide a preview; in news broadcasting, this is typically referred to as a "throw" or "toss".

A bridge was used by ABC between Roseanne and the December 1992 series premiere of The Jackie Thomas Show, a new sitcom co-created by Roseanne and Tom Arnold of Roseanne fame. A scene of the Connor family watching its opening on TV seamlessly transitioned into the program itself, with no junction in between. ABC commissioned a minute-by-minute Nielsen ratings report, which showed that the majority of viewers from Roseanne had been retained during the premiere. In June 2007, CBS scheduled a prime time encore of the season finale of The Price is Right—the final episode hosted by long-time emcee Bob Barker—as a lead-in to its telecast of the 34th Daytime Emmy Awards (where Barker and Price respectively won the awards for Outstanding Game Show Host and Outstanding Game Show), with an additional bridge scene featuring Barker.

Owing to both programs' news comedy formats, the Comedy Central program The Daily Show used newscast-style toss segments to promote its new spin-off and lead-out, The Colbert Report, in which host Jon Stewart would engage in a comedic conversation with the latter's host, Stephen Colbert, via split-screen. On the December 18, 2014 episode of The Daily Show, this segment was used to seamlessly segue into the series finale of The Colbert Report. At its conclusion, the show transitioned back to Stewart (giving the impression that the entire Colbert Report episode was merely a segment of The Daily Show), who concluded his show with its traditional closing segment "Your Moment of Zen" (which featured an outtake from a previous toss segment) as normal.

In some cases, a channel may intentionally allow a program to overrun into the next half-hour timeslot rather than end exactly on the half-hour, in order to discourage viewers from "surfing" away at traditional junction periods (since they had missed the beginnings of programs on other channels already). This can, however, cause disruptions with recorders if they are not aware of the scheduling (typically, digital video recorders can be configured to automatically record for a set length of time before and after a schedule's given timeslot in program guide data to account for possible variances). For a period, TBS intentionally scheduled all of its programs at 5 and 35 minutes past the hour rather than exactly on the half hour (a practice it marketed as "Turner Time"), to attract viewers tuning away from other channels.

=== Crossovers ===
Crossovers can be organized between multiple programs, in which a single storyline is extended across episodes of two or more separate programs. Typically, these involve programs that form a single franchise or shared universe, such as the ABC dramas Grey's Anatomy and Station 19 (both created by Shonda Rhimes), CBS's NCIS franchise (which have done crossovers between each other, as well as with CBS's reboot of Hawaii Five-0), and NBC's Chicago franchise (which have done crossovers between each other, and with fellow Dick Wolf series Law & Order: Special Victims Unit).

=== Counterprogramming ===
Counterprogramming is the practice of deliberately scheduling programming to attract viewers away from another, major program. Counterprogramming efforts often involve scheduling a contrasting program of a different genre or demographic, targeting viewers who may not be interested in the major program (such as a sporting event, which typically draws a predominantly-male audience, against an awards show that attracts a predominantly-female audience). Despite frequently being among the top U.S. television broadcasts of all time, the Super Bowl has had a prominent history of being counterprogrammed in this manner. One of the most prominent examples of this practice was Fox's 1992 airing of a special live episode of In Living Color against the game's halftime show.

Programs can also be counterprogrammed by a direct competitor in the same time slot, often resulting in the two programs attempting to attract viewers away from each other through publicity stunts and other tactics. These tactics have most notably been seen in counterprogramming efforts surrounding professional wrestling: WWE was known for its conflicts with the rival Jim Crockett Promotions, and the latter's corporate successor World Championship Wrestling (WCW) in the 1980s and 1990s (such as the Monday Night Wars between WWF Monday Night Raw and WCW Monday Nitro), and has since engaged in similar conflicts in the 2020s with the upstart All Elite Wrestling (such as the Wednesday Night Wars between AEW Dynamite and WWE NXT, as well as patterns of WWE deliberately scheduling supercards and specials on the same day as major AEW pay-per-views).

In some cases, broadcasters may attempt to adjust their schedules in order to avert attempts at counterprogramming, such as getting a slightly earlier time slot (in the hope that once viewers have become committed to a show they will not switch channels), scheduling the competing program on a different night, or moving it to a different portion of the television season to avoid competition altogether.

=== Dayparting ===
Dayparting is the practice of dividing the day into several parts, during each of which a different type program is appropriate for that time is aired. Daytime television shows are most often geared toward a particular demographic, and what the target audience typically engages in at that time.

=== Stripping ===
Stripping is the practice of running a single series in a consistent, daily time slot throughout the week, usually on weekdays. Daytime programs such as talk shows, variety shows, court shows, game shows, and soap operas, are typically aired in a strip format. Outside of serial drama formats such as telenovelas where popular, strips are rarely used for first-run entertainment programming outside of limited events.

Syndicated reruns of network programs that originally aired on a weekly basis are often aired as strips. Shows that are syndicated in this way generally have to have run for several seasons (the rule of thumb is usually 100 episodes) in order to have enough episodes to run without significant repeats.

=== Marathons ===
A marathon is the scheduling of a continuous, long-term block of programming as an event, usually devoted to airings of a single program or film franchise. When conducted using television series, a marathon may either consist of episodes aired in sequential order, or focus on episodes with specific themes (such as a holiday, or appearances by a specific actor or character).

Marathons are often aired on holidays (such as Syfy's annual The Twilight Zone marathon on New Year's Day, and Game Show Network airing a "Y2Play" marathon of game show series finales on New Year's Eve in 1999, hosted by comedian and recurring Match Game panelist Charles Nelson Reilly), as counterprogramming for major events airing on other channels, to lead into new episodes of a series, or to commemorate milestones/events surrounding a specific series or franchise (such as an anniversary, the network's acquisition of rights to broadcast a certain series or franchise, or a marathon of a series' complete run prior to its series finale). Some marathons may focus on the roles of a specific entertainer; the death of Betty White resulted in several networks scheduling marathons of programming on or around January 17, 2022—which would have been White's 100th birthday—featuring her television appearances, such as Hallmark Channel airing a marathon of The Golden Girls, and both Buzzr and Game Show Network airing marathons of her game show appearances.

While longer marathons are typically reserved for major events, the popularization of binge-watching via streaming services in the 2010s led to many U.S. cable networks adopting marathon-like blocks of programs as their regular schedule. To compete with streaming services such as Netflix releasing entire seasons of programs at once rather than releasing them on a week-to-week basis, TBS premiered seasons of its police sitcom Angie Tribeca in a marathon format. Similarly, free ad-supported streaming television (FAST) services often feature linear channels that are narrowly focused towards specific programs or franchises.

=== Theming ===
A broadcaster may temporarily dedicate all or parts of its schedule over a period of time to a specific theme. A well-known instance of a themed lineup is Discovery Channel's annual "Shark Week". Themed schedules are a common practice around major holidays—such as Valentine's Day, Halloween, and Christmas—where channels may air episodes of programs, specials, and films that relate to the holiday. Channels may also air marathons of their signature programs and film rights to target viewers who are on vacation.

The U.S. basic cable networks Freeform (25 Days of Christmas, 31 Days of Halloween) and Hallmark Channel are known for broadcasting long-term holiday programming events. After experiencing success with its Countdown to Christmas event, Hallmark Channel adopted a practice of dividing its programming into similarly branded "seasons" year-round, which are accompanied by thematically appropriate original series and television films. This strategy was part of an effort to position the channel as "a year-round destination for celebrations", and is synergistic with Hallmark Cards' core greeting card and collectibles businesses.

Turner Classic Movies similarly airs multiple themed programming events throughout the year, including the "Star of the Month" and "Summer Under the Stars"—which both showcase the roles of a specific actor, and "31 Days of Oscar"—which showcases notable nominees and winners at the Academy Awards.

=== Time slot ===
A show's time slot or place in the schedule could be crucial to its success or failure; generally, earlier prime time slots have a stronger appeal towards family viewing and younger demographics, while later time slots generally appeal more towards older demographics. Some time slots, colloquially known as "graveyard slots" or "death slots", are prone to having smaller potential audiences (with one such example in the U.S. being Friday nights), or insurmountable competition from highly rated series.

Occasionally, some programs may be intentionally "burned off" as filler in death slots or other lesser-viewed time slots in order to fulfill commitments to unsuccessful series.

== See also ==
- Audience flow
- Broadcast clock
- Effects of time zones on North American broadcasting
- Electronic media
- Fall schedule
- Interstitial television show
- Radio Computing Services – automated scheduling for radio stations
- Rotation (broadcast programming)
- Timeshift channel
- TV Guide
- TV listings
- Terrestrial television
- Cable television
