= Deb Chachra =

American engineer and materials scientist

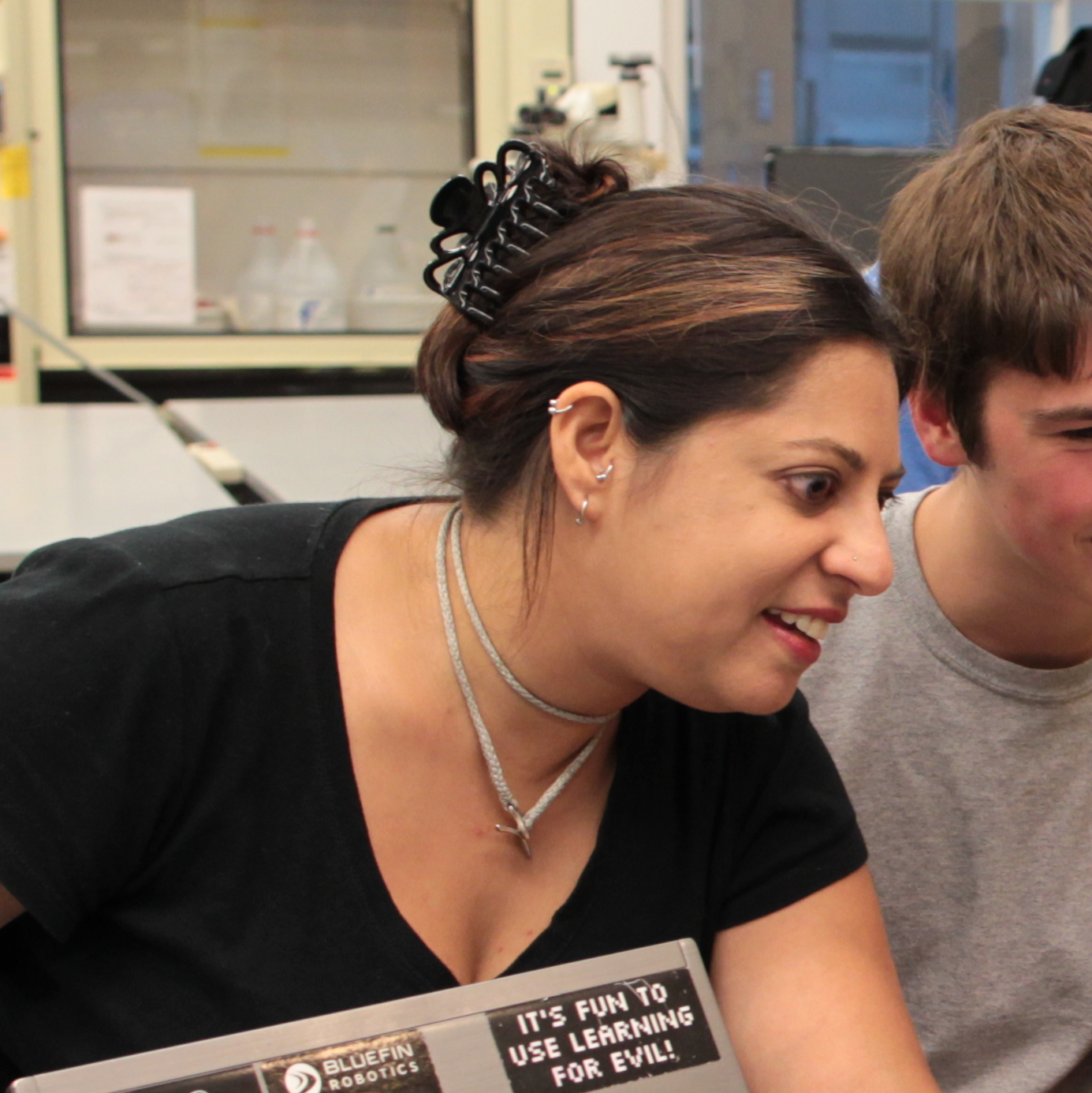
- Born: 1971 (age 54–55)
- Education: University of Toronto (BS, MA, PhD)
- Awards: NSF Career Award (2009)
- Scientific career
- Workplaces: Olin College; Massachusetts Institute of Technology
- Thesis: The influence of lifelong exposure to environmental fluoride on bone quality in humans (2001)
- Doctoral advisor: Marc Grynpas
- Website: debcha.org

Deb Chachra (born 1971) is a materials scientist and a professor at Olin College. She specialises in biological materials and infrastructure. She is interested in innovations in engineering education and was one of the founding members of the materials faculty at Olin.

Chachra is the author of How Infrastructure Works, a non-fiction book published in 2023.

== Education and early career ==
Chachra grew up in Scarborough, Ontario. Her parents were immigrants from New Delhi, India. She wanted to be an astronaut. She studied engineering at the University of Toronto where she completed her Bachelor of Science, Master of Arts and Doctor of Philosophy degrees. Her PhD on the influence of fluoride on bone quality was supervised by Marc Grynpas in the Department of Materials at The University of Toronto. She studied Colletes bees, which create a cellophane-like substance to protect their eggs within tunnels. The bees first create fibres of silk, followed by layers of plastics.

== Career and research ==
After her PhD, Chachra joined Massachusetts Institute of Technology as a postdoctoral researcher. She worked in Lorna Gibson's lab on how bone responds to ageing. She looked at the shelf-life of bioprosthetic heart valves.

Chachra has contributed to The Atlantic, Untapped, MIT Technology Review, and the comic Bitch Planet.

She is a trustee of the Awesome Foundation. Her newsletter Metafoundry was described by Wired magazine as being 'like being plugged Oculus-style into her brain while she meditates on science and culture'. She appeared on the PBS show If You Build It. She joined Olin College after her postdoc, working on fluoride and mineralised tissues. She was one of their founding faculty – the first class graduated in 2006.

=== Engineering education research ===
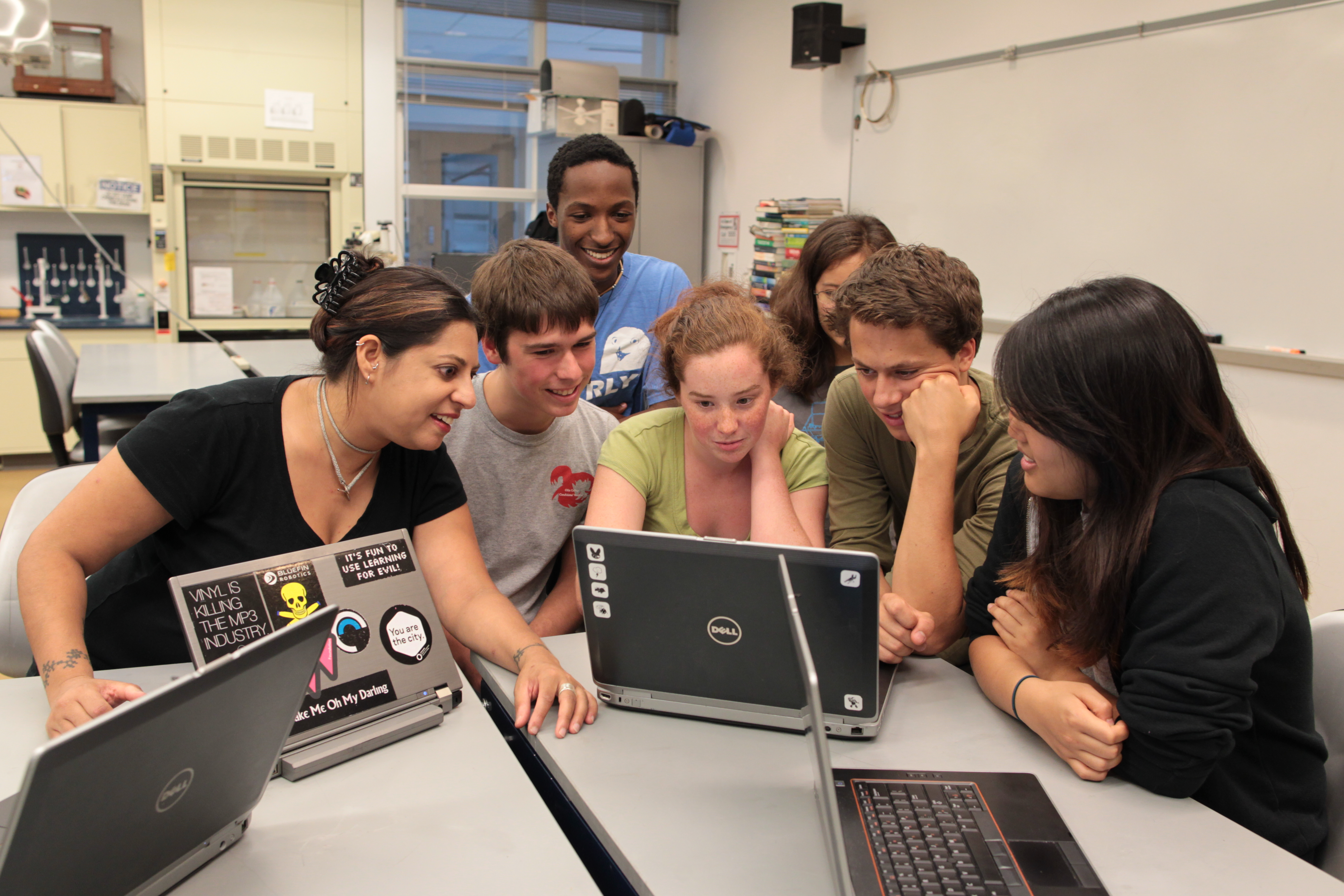
Prof Chachra's students at Olin College

Chachra studies the experience of student engineers. She does not like to be referred to as a "maker" because she believes the word is associated with a male dominated culture. She is part of Olin College's Collaboratory. She writes a column for American Society for Engineering Education's magazine Prism called Reinvention. At Olin College she is looking at how women and minority students engage with engineering education, designing interventions to improve retention and diversity. She works with engineers all over the world on the development of new education programs. She has investigated group- and project-based learning in engineering education. She explored ways to develop a bioengineering program with a small footprint. In 2013 she studied gender and computing, developing a "Gender and Engineering Exploration Kit". Chachra has challenged academic publishers to combat bias in the industry. She has written editorials for Nature about the experience of women engineers. She continues to return the University of Toronto, talking about the design of engineering education.

=== Awards and honors ===
Chachra received a National Science Foundation CAREER Award to work on engineering education. In 2009 she was awarded the American Society for Engineering Education William Elgin Wickenden Award.

== Works ==
- Chachra, Deb (2023-10-17). How Infrastructure Works. New York: Penguin. ISBN 978-0-593-08659-9.
