= Sylvia Libow Martinez =

American engineer

Sylvia Libow Martinez an American engineer whose book Invent To Learn: Making, Tinkering, and Engineering in the Classroom co-authored with Gary S. Stager has been acknowledged as the "bible" of the school Maker Movement. She, with this one book, is largely collected by libraries worldwide.

Sylvia Martinez received her bachelor's degree in electrical engineering from UCLA, and a master's degree in educational technology from Pepperdine. She began her career as an engineer for Magnavox Research Labs focusing on the development of high frequency receiver systems and navigation software for GPS satellites. After six years, she transitioned to educational software development where she presided over the design and development at several software publishers (Davidson & Associates, Knowledge Adventure, and Vivendi Universal) for over a decade. She then shifted to the non-profit world, where she held the position of President at Generation YES. She sought to champion young people in the use of modern technology to advance education and community. This cumulative work provides the groundwork for her co-authorship of the book Invent to Learn: Making, Tinkering, and Engineering in the Classroom. Her time is now spent advancing the Science, Technology, Engineering, and Math (STEM) and Maker Movement initiatives through speaking engagements and workshops and running the educational publishing company Constructing Modern Knowledge Press, and the jazz publishing company Cymbal Press.
