= Audience flow =

Type of media analysis for marketing

Audience flow describes how people move through media offerings in a temporal sequence. Stable patterns of audience flow were first identified in the early twentieth century when radio broadcasters noticed the tendency of audiences to stay tuned to one program after another. By the 1950s, television audiences were demonstrating similar patterns of flow. Not long thereafter, social scientists began to quantify patterns of television audience flow and its determinants. Audience flow continues to characterize linear media consumption. Newer forms of nonlinear media evidence analogous patterns of “attention flow.”

== Flow in linear media ==
Radio and network television arrange content in a linear sequence determined by the broadcaster. Commercial media, who sell audiences to advertisers, do what they can to attract and retain audiences. By the 1930s, audience measurement made radio listeners “visible” to stations and allowed them to assess which program sequences kept people listening. Television audiences were subject to the same type of surveillance and manipulation. These practices gave rise to well-established broadcast programming strategies.

By the 1960s, marketing researchers in England began a systematic program of research to document patterns of television viewing. They dubbed the tendency of audiences to watch one program after another on any given evening an “inheritance effect.” The tendency of audiences to watch a TV series from one week to the next was termed “repeat-viewing.” These, and other patterns of mass audience behavior, were remarkably stable. They were governed, in part, by underlying patterns of audience availability, and the structure of program offerings. They were not, as most bodies of audience theory would predict, much affected by program type loyalties.

== Flow in nonlinear media ==
The growth of digital networks made it possible to deliver media to people on demand. Such nonlinear systems seemed to empower users and suggested that audience flow might be a thing of the past. By 2008, industry analysts had begun to claim that since each person composed their own flow, the media had lost its ability to manage audience behavior. Such assessments are problematic for three reasons. First, audience flow in linear media is still evident. Second, many nonlinear platforms such as music or video streaming services use algorithms to serve up media sequentially, creating analogous patterns of flow. Third, beyond individual digital platforms, the internet itself has unseen architectures that nudge users in certain directions, creating online attention flows. As Wu et al. concluded “not unlike the linear media of radio and television, the new purveyors of online media strive to manage people's time and attention to suit themselves.”

== The consequences of flow ==
Audience flow is macro-level phenomena that can involve millions of people and should not be confused with mental flow states. As such it has the potential to have widespread behavioral, cultural and ideological consequences.

In the 1970s, cultural theorist Raymond Williams argued that sequencing content into “flow texts” defined television as a cultural form, and that its significance was in how it directed attention to issues such as sex and violence. Hence, television flow was implicated in “political manipulation” and “cultural degradation.” More recently, theorists have highlighted the potential of all media to create “curated flows” of content. Although these content flows may encourage certain patterns of exposure, they do not reveal which media offerings people actually encounter. Nor do they account for online choice architectures that span curating platforms such as news outlets and social media. The analysis of audience flow has the virtue of assessing potential effects against actual patterns of online consumption at scale.

== See also ==
- Sequence analysis in social sciences
