= Broadcast clock =

Graphic for radio or TV hourly schedule

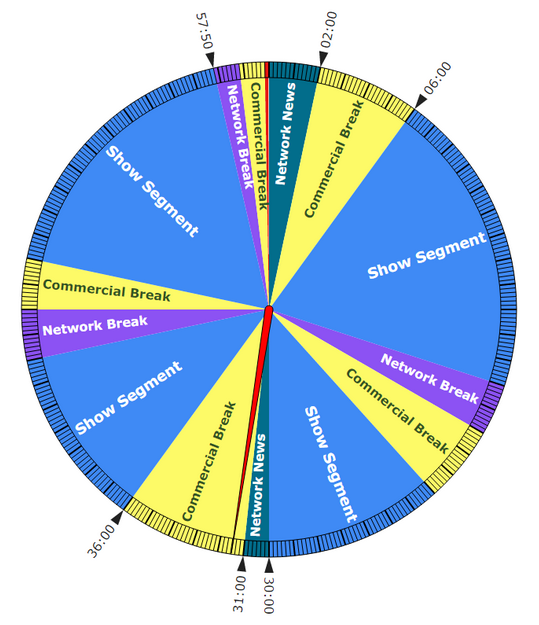
Sample broadcast clock

A broadcast clock, format clock, or clockwheel is a template that displays a radio or television's hourly format in a graphical representation of a clock. Broadcast programming, especially radio, often follows an hourly pattern where certain segments such as news and commercials are repeated every hour at specific times. A broadcast clock displays these segments graphically, which assists broadcasters in scheduling, thereby avoiding dead air and preventing random program selection by on-air staff.
