= Chris Anderson (writer) =

British-American author and entrepreneur

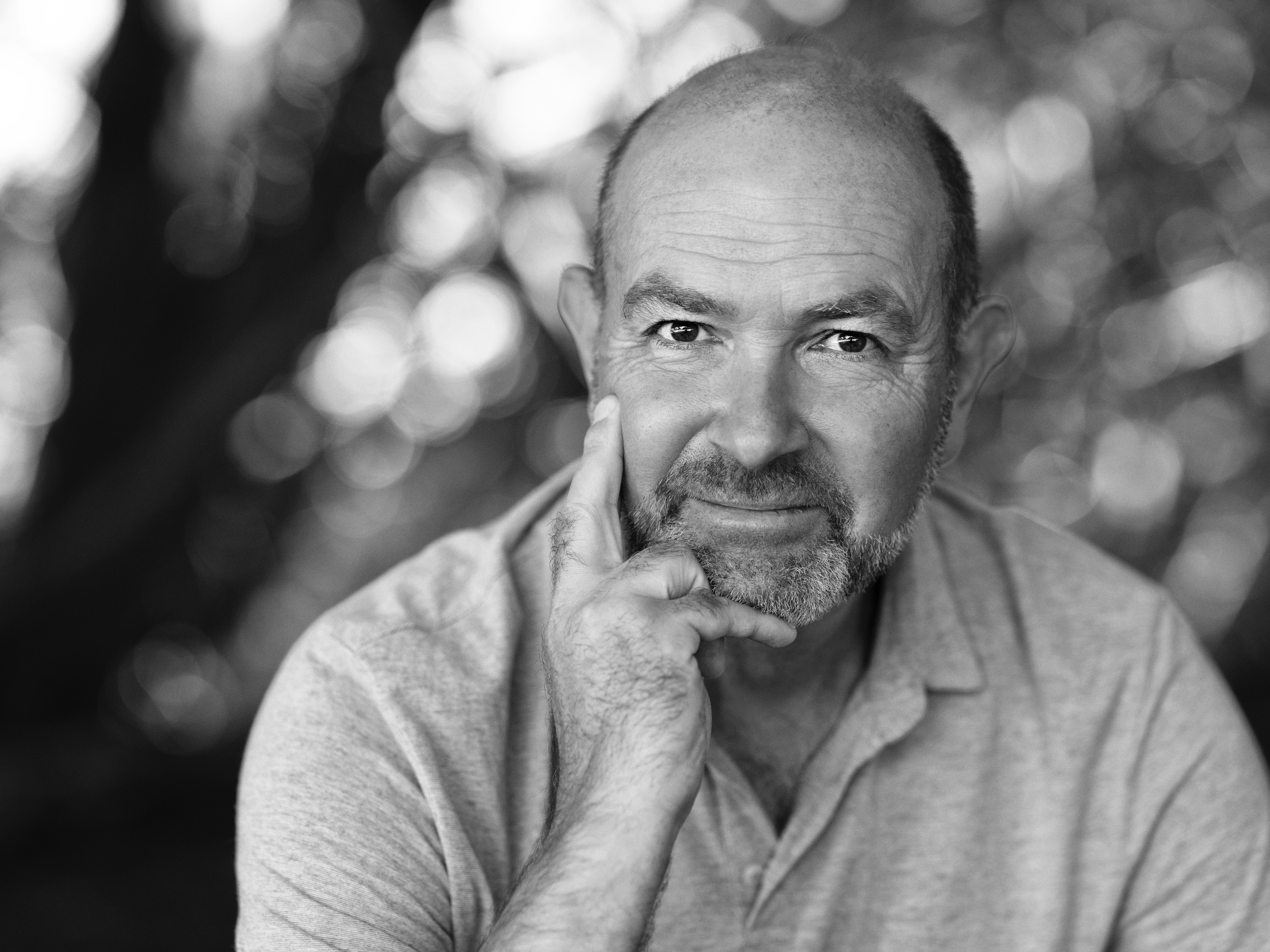
- Anderson in 2020
- Born: July 9, 1961 (age 65); London, England, UK
- Citizenship: United States; United Kingdom
- Education: George Washington University
- Occupations: CEO of 3D Robotics, author, entrepreneur
- Children: 5

Chris Anderson (born July 9, 1961) is an English-American author and entrepreneur. He was with The Economist for seven years before joining Wired magazine in 2001, where he was the editor-in-chief until 2012. He is known for his 2004 article entitled "The Long Tail", which he later expanded into the 2006 book, The Long Tail: Why the Future of Business Is Selling Less of More. He is the cofounder and current CEO of 3D Robotics, a drone manufacturing company.

== Life and work ==
=== Early life ===
Anderson was born in London. His family moved to the United States when he was five. He enrolled in a degree program in physics at George Washington University and went on to study quantum mechanics and science journalism at the University of California, Berkeley. He later did research at Los Alamos National Laboratory.

=== Career ===
He began his career with a six-year period as editor at the two scientific journals, Nature and Science. He then joined The Economist in 1994, where he remained for seven years, during which time he was stationed in London, Hong Kong and New York City in various positions, ranging from Technology Editor to US Business Editor. He took over as editor of Wired in 2001.

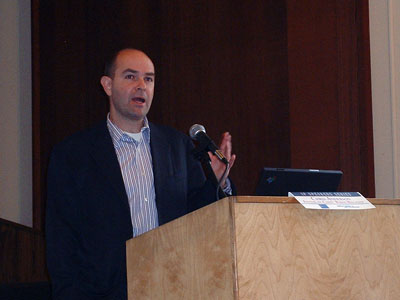
Anderson speaking in Boalt Hall at UC Berkeley

His 2004 article "The Long Tail" in Wired was expanded into a book in 2006, titled The Long Tail: Why the Future of Business Is Selling Less of More. It appeared on The New York Times Nonfiction Best Sellers list. The book argues that products in low demand or that have a low sales volume can collectively build a better market share than its rivals, or exceed the relatively few current bestsellers and blockbusters, provided the store or distribution channel is large enough. The book earned Anderson the 2007 Gerald Loeb Award for Business Book.

His next book, entitled Free: The Future of a Radical Price (2009), examines the advantages of a strategy where products and services are initially given to customers for free, and how businesses can profit more in the long run. Anderson was accused of plagiarizing content from English Wikipedia for his book. Anderson responded that he had disagreements with the criticism, and reasoned that the mention of citations were avoided due to the changing nature of content in English Wikipedia. However, the whole episode led him to integrate footnotes into the text, and the digital editions of Free were corrected with the revision. Free debuted as No. 12 on The New York Times Best Seller list. It was also available as a free download for a limited time, and an estimated 200,000 to 300,000 digital copies were downloaded in the first two weeks. The unabridged audiobook remains free.

Anderson's third book, Makers: The New Industrial Revolution (2012), was based on his 2010 article "Atoms Are the New Bits". The book describes how entrepreneurs are using open source design and 3D printing as a platform for driving resurgence of American manufacturing. The ideas he portrayed, such as crowdsourcing of ideas, utilization of available lower-cost design and manufacturing tools, and reviewing options to outsource capital-intensive manufacturing were highlighted in the February 2012 Harvard Business Review article "From Do It Yourself to Do It Together".

Around 2017, Anderson started DIYRobocars, a community that builds and races scaled-down autonomous cars utilizing computer vision and deep learning.

=== Ventures ===
In 2007, Anderson founded GeekDad, a do-it-yourself blog that later became part of Wired.com. He was the editor until the role was handed over to Ken Denmead, and he now serves as editor emeritus of GeekDad. The same year, Anderson founded Booktour.com, a free online service that connected authors on tour with audiences. In September 2011, Booktour.com folded.

In October 2007, Anderson, who has been described as an "aerial-reconnaissance enthusiast", flew a remote-controlled aircraft allegedly equipped with a camera over Lawrence Berkeley National Laboratory, causing security concerns when the aircraft crashed into a tree. The enthusiasm turned inspiration for co-founding 3D Robotics, a 2009 robotics manufacturing spin-off of the DIYdrones.com. 3D Robotics produces the Ardupilot series of autopilots, which are based on the Arduino platform.

In May 2007, Anderson was featured as one of the top 100 thinkers in Time magazine's annual list for 2007.

== Personal life ==
Anderson currently lives in Orinda, California, with his wife and five children. He met his wife while working at the scientific journal, Nature. He has dual U.S.-U.K. citizenship.

== Works ==
- Anderson, Chris (2006). The Long Tail: Why the Future of Business Is Selling Less of More. New York: Hyperion. ISBN 978-1-4013-0966-4.
- Anderson, Chris (2009). Free: The Future of a Radical Price. New York: Hyperion. ISBN 978-1-4013-2290-8.
- Anderson, Chris (2012). Makers: The New Industrial Revolution. New York: Crown Business. ISBN 978-0-3077-2095-5.
