= The Long Tail (book) =

2006 book by Chris Anderson

The Long Tail: Why the Future of Business Is Selling Less of More
- First edition cover
- Author: Chris Anderson
- Language: English
- Subject: Internet, retailing, e-commerce
- Genre: Non-fiction
- Publisher: Hyperion
- Publication date: July 11, 2006
- Publication place: United States
- Media type: Print, e-book
- Pages: 256 pp.
- ISBN: 1401302378
- Followed by: Free

The Long Tail: Why the Future of Business Is Selling Less of More is a book by Chris Anderson, editor in chief of Wired magazine. The book was initially published on July 11, 2006, by Hyperion. The book, Anderson's first, is an expansion of his 2004 article "The Long Tail" in the magazine. The book was listed in The New York Times Nonfiction Best Sellers list. It was shortlisted for the Financial Times and Goldman Sachs Business Book of the Year Award on 18 September 2006.

== Concept ==
The book argues that products in low demand or that have a low sales volume can collectively build a better market share than their rivals, or exceed the relatively few current bestsellers and blockbusters, provided the store or distribution channel is large enough. The term long tail has gained popularity as describing the retailing strategy of selling a large number of different items which each sell in relatively small quantities, usually in addition to selling large quantities of a small number of popular items. Chris Anderson popularized the concept in an October 2004 Wired magazine article, in which he mentioned Amazon.com, Apple and Yahoo! as examples of businesses applying this strategy.

== Criticism ==
The Long Tail began life in 2004 as an article for Wired after Mr. Anderson found himself blowing a pop quiz in the offices of a digital jukebox company called Ecast. He had badly underestimated what percentage of the 10,000 albums available on the company's Internet-connected jukeboxes had a track chosen at least once each quarter. The Ecast chief executive said that the figure was 98 percent. The average Wal-Mart, by contrast, carries 4,500 different CD's and the top 20 albums account for 90 percent of its music revenue. Mr. Anderson had hit on something. Remove the limitations of bricks-and-mortar retailers—like scarce shelf space, which leads companies to concentrate on the most popular products—and the infrequent sellers or undistributed merchandise suddenly start to acquire more value. ... This is not a new thought. The atomization of culture has been going on for years.

—Review by The New York Times
