= Dump months =

Months in which low-quality films are released

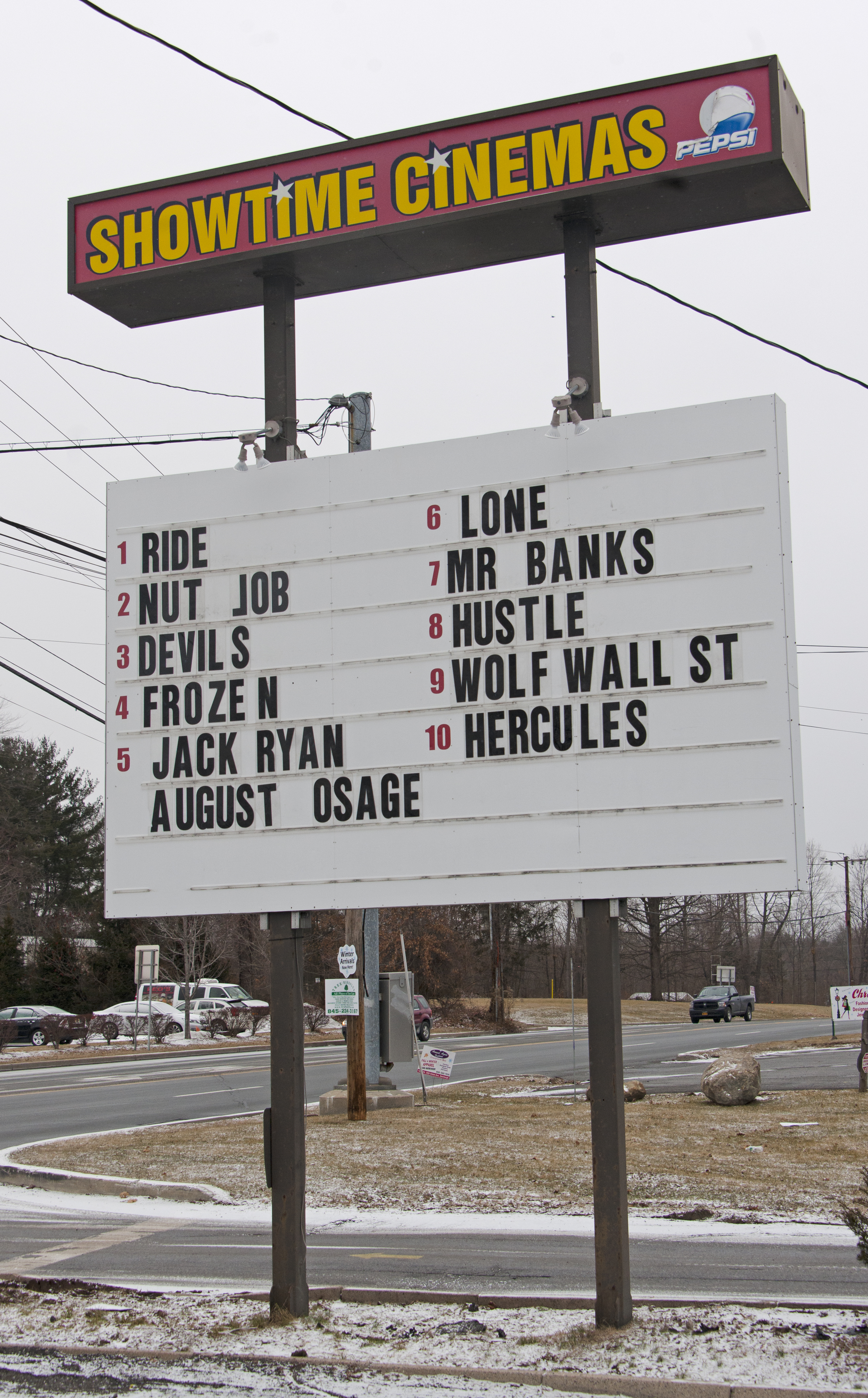
A marquee in January 2014 advertising an assortment of films typical for that time of year

Before the era of streaming television, the dump months were two periods of the year when there have been lowered commercial and critical expectations for most new theatrical releases from American filmmakers and distributors. During these periods domestic audiences are smaller than the rest of the year, so no tentpole movies are released. January and February are usually most commonly described this way, with August and September sometimes included. Releases during those times primarily include films that would have been released at other times of year had they performed better at test screenings, films with less prominent stars, genre films (particularly horror), movies that cannot be easily marketed and films intended for a teenage audience, which has fewer entertainment options outside the home.

Several factors combine to create the dump months, most of them circumstances particular to the United States and Canada, the primary market for most major Hollywood releases. Both periods immediately follow the times of year in which the distributors concentrate films they expect to be the biggest critical or commercial successes, periods of increased spending on entertainment generally. While this often means that moviegoers have less disposable income afterward, economics alone does not explain the dump months. The weather and competition from other forms of mass entertainment and professional sports also play a part; the winter dump months are further affected by the Academy Awards eligibility rules.

The dump months evolved over the course of the 20th century. Although during the studio era most major releases followed annual patterns similar to today's, several classics like The Kid, Shadow of a Doubt and The Treasure of the Sierra Madre were released during January. Since the decline of the studios, however, memorable films from the dump months have become rare exceptions. Notable examples of these for films released in January and February include The Silence of the Lambs, a well-reviewed box office smash that went on to win the 1991 Academy Award for Best Picture, Get Out in 2017, and Black Panther, which became the number one movie of 2018 and a multiple Academy Award winner. In the late 1980s, Dirty Dancing and Fatal Attraction became hits following releases in August and September respectively.

Films released during the dump months have not always been consigned to cinematic oblivion. Some, like Tremors and Office Space, have become cult classics. Starting with Cloverfield, some 21st-century dump-months releases have managed to exceed $100 million on box office receipts. The similar success of low-budget horror films like The Devil Inside and Mama in the early 2010s has prompted studios to release films in that genre at times of the year other than Halloween and the dump months.

== Etymology ==
The term "dump months" comes from the belief that studios use the time periods in question as a "dumping ground" for movies they are contractually obligated to release but believe to have limited commercial prospects at best. "The big studios would never in a million years use this phrase", Dade Hayes, coauthor of Open Wide: How Hollywood Box Office Became A National Obsession, told Newsday in August 2017. "[B]ut they do view [these times of year] as a dumping ground."

Critics and journalists have no such reservations. "The first months of the year are known as the 'dump months' in Hollywood," wrote Vegas Seven critic Una LaMarche in early 2013, a period characterized by "movies that studios dislike, and want to release with little fanfare." Likewise, Paul Shirey at JoBlo.com dismisses September as "one of the most worthless months at the box office."

Jay Carr, a film critic for The Boston Globe, deployed the term in a 1989 article for his newspaper, one of the earliest uses of the term in print. "Everybody knows that January and February are post-Christmas dump months for the studios, when they open the movies that weren't strong enough for Christmas and aren't strong enough for Easter", Carr wrote. Use of the term became more common in the early 2010s.

== Causes ==
While both dump-month periods immediately follow periods of greater movie attendance, when event movies expected to be critical or commercial successes are released, and periods of greater consumer spending generally there are also reasons specific to both periods that further dampen movie attendance to limit the expected box office returns to the extent that movies with strong potential will be scheduled for other times of year.

=== January–February ===
The main impediment to the release of highly anticipated or high-quality films in January and February is the calendar of the two major film awards, the Golden Globe Awards (January) and the Academy Awards, or "Oscars" (late February or early March), which overlap with those months. The winter weather also adds uncertainty to estimates of potential box office. Two holidays during the time provide some slight relief; however, they are offset by the distraction of Super Bowl weekend, which depresses spending on movies. The combined gross for all January releases 2002–2012 has averaged $387 million; for February it is $615 million. By comparison December, with its holiday releases, averages $1.2 billion.

It's easy to kill a movie.
Just move it to January.

— Mike Myers as Dr. Evil, mocking the government of North Korea for supposedly sponsoring the hacking attack on Sony Pictures in response to The Interview, on Saturday Night Live, December 19, 2014

Spending is low to begin with since many consumers are cutting back and repaying debts incurred during the preceding holiday season, (Note: In 2017 a Gallup poll found, prior to the holiday season, that Americans expected to spend, on average, $862 on gifts during that time of year. Of those polled, 34% expected to spend more than a thousand dollars.) as well as having less free time, Jeremy Kirk of Firstshowing.net, when asked to explain the dearth of good films in January, notes that moviegoers are returning to their work and school routines during the month. C. Robert Cargill of Ain't It Cool News adds that only those over 35, "who have savings accounts and weren't tapped out by Christmas," can afford to go to the movies regularly then. He attributes the early-year success of Taken and its sequels to that market, as well as that of many of Clint Eastwood's recent films, to that older market.

The website Box Office Mojo, which publishes reports on film grosses, divides the movie year into five seasons. It defines the winter season as lasting from the first day after New Year's week or weekend ends through the Thursday before the first Friday in March. The site's data go back to 1982, and in every year the winter season has had the lowest box office grosses. The weakest winter was 1983, when The Entity's $13 million take led the way to a total of $93.4 million in domestic grosses for all movies released during that season. On the other end, 2012 had the strongest winter, at $1.24 billion, topped by Safe House, which took in $124 million.

==== Awards calendar ====
At the end of the year comes the holiday movie season, when the studios release both tentpole movies, such as the latest installments in popular franchises that are expected to be highly successful and "Oscar bait" movies that are seen as likely to earn critical praise and, more importantly, nominations for major awards such as the Golden Globes and Oscars, the industry's most prestigious. Those nominations are then used to promote the film. But while the former nominations are announced in December with the awards themselves given in early January, the Academy Award nominations are announced after the Golden Globes, and the actual awards are not given until late February (Note: Until 2004 both the nomination announcement and awards ceremonies took place later in the winter (the latter in April, as recently as 1988).) leaving most of the first two months of the year as Oscar season: a period during which any Golden Globes received as well as Oscar nominations can be used to promote the film to audiences, while studios lobby Academy members to vote for their nominees.

To be eligible for award consideration, the Academy of Motion Picture Arts and Sciences requires that a film be shown in a theater in Los Angeles County, California, for at least seven consecutive days during which it is advertised in print media. Studios hoping to position a film for some nominations usually satisfy that minimum requirement, then ease them into wide release from then until the nominations or the awards ceremony. The flexibility this marketing strategy requires means that screens be available, and studios limit their releases of new films during this time to that end. As critic Ty Burr explained in a 2013 New York Times Magazine article on the mediocrity of new releases in the first month of the year: "[T]he studios ... know our attention is elsewhere."

New films shown publicly anywhere for the first time after January 1 themselves are ineligible for Oscars until the following year, by which time they will likely have been forgotten by critics, audiences and voters. The Silence of the Lambs, winner of the 1991 Academy Award for Best Picture, is a rare exception, as the only film in the post-studio era released in the first two months of its year to go on to win that Oscar. Burr calls it "the grand exception to the January Movies Will Never Amount to Anything rule," and finds that only one other classic of the late 20th century, Dr. Strangelove, was a January release. (Note: Its premiere had originally been scheduled for the preceding November, but was postponed due to the Kennedy assassination.) Modern examples of early releases that received Best Picture nominations includes Get Out (2017), Everything Everywhere All at Once (2022), and Sinners (2025). In all of the listed examples, the films exceeded box office expectations thanks to positive word of mouth, enabling them to sustain momentum into awards season.

Theaters will also still be running any holiday-season hits even if they had not been nominated for awards, further reducing the screens available for new movies. Ray Subers, an editor at Box Office Mojo, says there are two types of January moviegoer that keep December releases on screens throughout the months. "Discerning adult audiences", he told The Atlantic in 2012, spend the month congregating to those films on critics' lists for the best of the year they have not yet gotten to see, while "the general moviegoers are seeing the event films of December."

==== Winter weather ====
During January and February, winter storms become more likely in the Northern Hemisphere than they are in December. While they do not affect the entire U.S., the Northeast and Midwest are particularly prone to them, along with most neighboring areas of Canada. This includes many major metropolitan areas, and movie markets, in both countries.

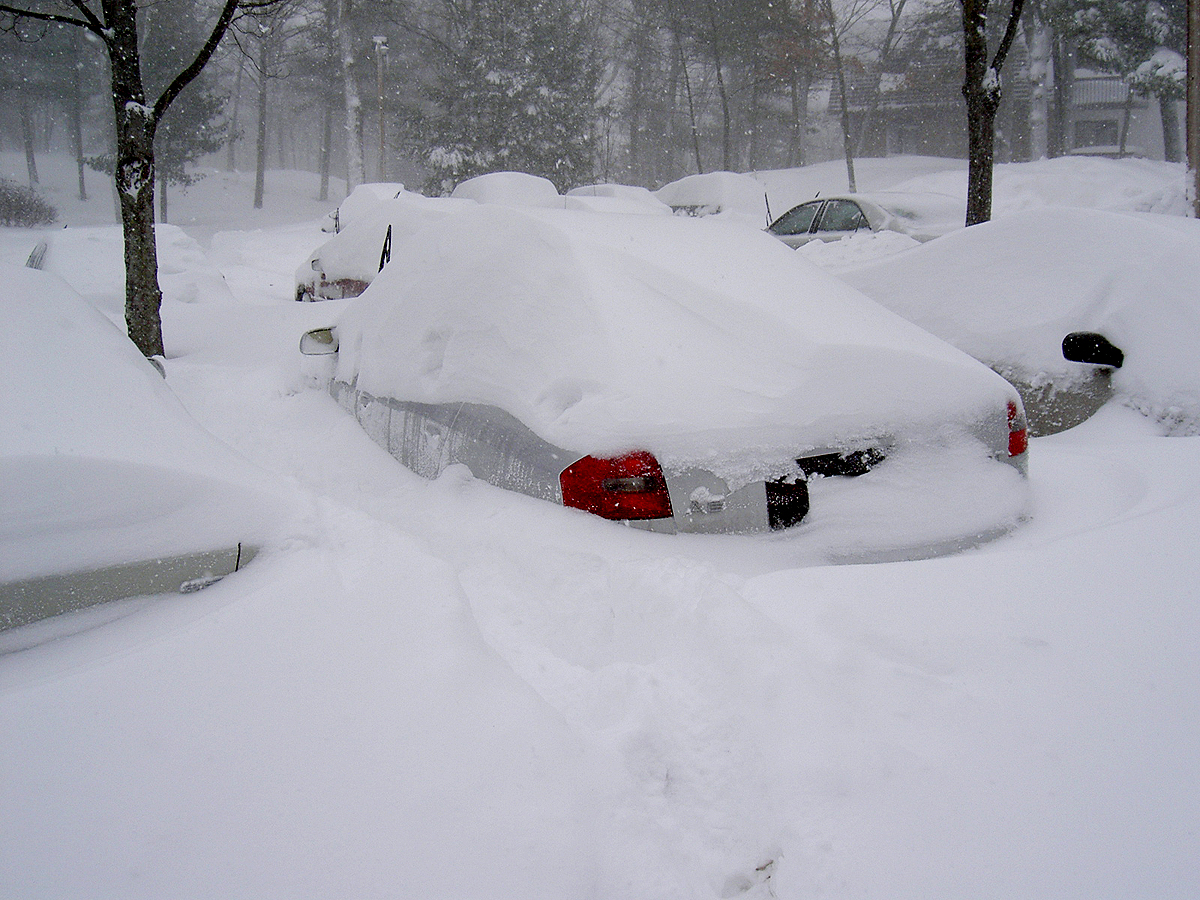
A heavy snowstorm in February 2013 made it difficult for people to travel to movie theaters

When winter storms hit, bringing with them combinations of precipitation that making driving difficult and sometimes dangerous, moviegoers often prefer to stay home. Non-essential travel is officially discouraged, and in severe enough weather all non-emergency driving can be banned in some areas until the situation improves. In anticipation of the February 2013 nor'easter, which struck on the month's first weekend, three large chains closed down many of their theaters in the Northeast. Industry analysts feared that the storm could seriously impact the box office prospects of two films opening that weekend, Identity Thief and Side Effects, both of which were seen as having potential to do better than most winter movies. While it afterwards appeared that the two films were not seriously affected, and did better than expected, with Identity Thief even winning the weekend, despite generally poor reviews and word of mouth, with $36 million in receipts, overall box office was down 45 percent from the same weekend the previous year. Side Effects finished a distant third with a quarter of Identity Thief's take. The clearest sign of the storm's effect, according to Box Office Mojo, was the 35 percent drop in earnings for Silver Linings Playbook, then in wide release after several Oscar nominations.

==== Holiday weekends and Super Bowl ====
While holiday weekends in the US generally increase film audiences and thus attract major releases throughout the year, the two that occur during these months—Martin Luther King Day in January and Presidents' Day in February—offer only a modest prospect for improvement. The most lucrative take by any movie on Martin Luther King Day weekend is $107.2 million by American Sniper in 2015, its first weekend in wide release; the previous best opening weekend was Ride Along the previous year, taking in $41.5 million ($48.6 million if the entire three-day holiday weekend is counted).

Presidents' Day benefits by its proximity to Valentine's Day (which, as it is always February 14, is often a weekday), which offers the studios enough chance of a payoff, usually from romantic comedies and other "chick flicks" marketed towards women as date movies. "[Some years] it's been six straight weeks of dreck until" that holiday, says Cargill. Fifty Shades of Grey, the 2015 adaptation of the bestselling erotic novel, took in $93 million on its opening weekend, the largest take for a Presidents' Day weekend until Deadpool broke that record the year later. Valentine's Day, the 2010 romantic comedy with a large ensemble cast, is third with $63.1 million. Third among opening weekends is Ghost Rider, which took in $52 million in 2007; the best performance by a previously released film on President's Day weekend is the $62.4 million take by The Lego Movie, a week after its release in 2014. In 2018, the superhero film Black Panther set a new record for that holiday weekend with $235 million In addition to the consistent popularity of the Marvel Cinematic Universe franchise, the critical praise and the holiday weekend, Marvel Studios took advantage of February's designation as Black History Month, a cultural event that made it an ideal time to release a film with such obvious African themes.

Any boost movie grosses get from those two holidays, however, is offset by what typically comes between them. The Super Bowl, the annual championship game of the National Football League, has been in recent years (Note: The first Super Bowl, which aroused little fan interest and did not even sell out, was played in mid-January; by the early 2000s an expansion of the NFL's regular-season and playoff schedule had pushed it to the first weekend of February.) played on either the last Sunday of January or the first one of February. It is accompanied by heavy media attention and frequent gatherings all over the country to watch the game on television, accompanied with food and beverages purchased with money that might otherwise be spent on movie tickets. "Does the Super Bowl affect ticket sales?" asks Scott Gwin at Cinemablend. "The answer, of course, is yes. In fact, there's a decent chance Budweiser spends more on advertising that Sunday than America does in theaters."

The most successful film to open during Super Bowl weekend is the 2008 concert film Hannah Montana and Miley Cyrus: Best of Both Worlds Concert, which took in $31.1 million, almost half the total it would earn during a released limited to just that weekend and the following week. In a close second is Dear John, grossing $30.5 million in 2010, for the strongest Super Bowl weekend opening for a conventional release. Both films had strong appeal to female moviegoers, an audience more receptive to moviegoing on a weekend dominated by a sporting event. The 2008 action film Taken, which Cargill noted for its success in appealing to an older audience, took in $24.7 million on its opening weekend on its way to total receipts of over $100 million, making it a distant third.

=== August–September ===
The year's other dump period straddles the late summer and early fall. "As we enter the dog days of summer, we get the summer movie season dregs as well," wrote PopMatters editor Bill Gibron, anticipating August 2013.

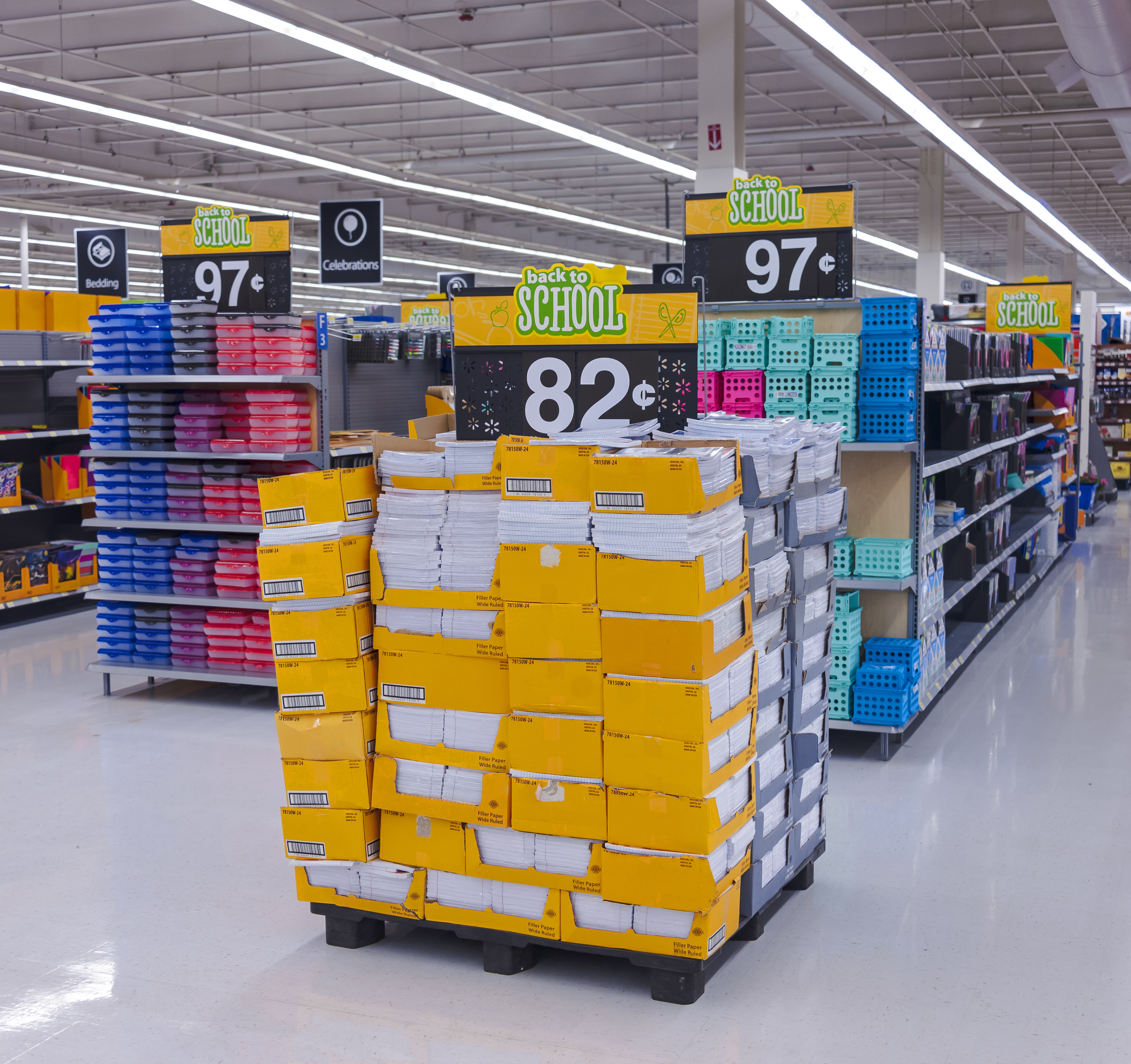
Back-to-school sales adversely affect movie grosses in August and September

By the end of the summer seasonal jobs end, just as with the winter dump months, and moviegoers under the age of 24, who make up 41 percent of the audience, a larger share than their overall portion of the population, begin to return to school.

Tuition payments, and retailers' back-to-school sales further cut into movie grosses; Huntington Bank's annual Backpack Index found in 2017 that costs for school supplies and activity fees, not including taxes or clothing, ranged from $662 for elementary-school students to almost $1,500 for those in high school.

"The prevailing wisdom is that people don't go to the movies in August" due to family vacations (on which Americans spend almost $2,000 a year, on average), summer camp, among other factors, Vulture complained as it pondered another potentially dreary month in 2008. While an August release can open as successfully as a film earlier in the summer, "[i]t just doesn't have the ability to run five or six weeks so there's a scramble for June and July," Ted Mundorff, head of Landmark Theatres, told the Fort Worth Star-Telegram in 2014. The type of films that interest younger audiences in the early summer, he elaborates, do not do well after Labor Day.

The summer dump period does not lend itself to being as clearly delineated as the winter dump months. In the past, it was usually considered to include all of August and September, and in some years still may. But, in years with many major summer movies, some may open on the first or second weekend of August to avoid competing with other such movies, such as Guardians of the Galaxy, the first-ever August release by Marvel Studios, which earned $94 million over its North American opening weekend, setting a record for the month. It was the only summer film to earn over $300 million domestically, and became the first August release to be the summer's top grossing film in over three decades, and was also one of the year's top-grossing films.

It is August's last two weekends that are more universally seen as the beginning of the late-summer dump months, when only forgettable films are likely to be released, with occasional exceptions like Dirty Dancing, which went on to make $63 million domestically from its release in late August 1987, and spawn several sequels and a franchise, and Straight Outta Compton, which stayed at number one for three consecutive weeks in mid and late August 2015 en route to making $161 million domestically.

At the beginning of September is the annual American celebration of Labor Day, the only holiday weekend during this period. Of all the year's holiday weekends it has reliably been the weakest in terms of movie box office, with the top opener and overall grosser for the weekend being 2021's Shang-Chi and the Legend of the Ten Rings at $94.6 million, far surpassing the previous record holder, 2007's Rob Zombie-directed reimagining of Halloween, with $30.5 million. Shang-Chi also broke that film's record for overall gross for a film released on Labor Day weekend, its $224.5 million take again far outpacing Halloween's $58.3 million.

Once September begins, younger moviegoers are preoccupied with starting the school year and thus less likely to go to the movies on weeknights than they were in summertime. As with the winter months, football also has an impact at the box office as not only NFL teams but college and high school teams resume play, primarily on weekends. "[W]e are left with a series of movies competing for box office scraps in a month when Hollywood assumes no one goes to the movies," says a Yahoo critic.

Some September movies have triumphed critically and commercially. In 1987, Fatal Attraction, which opened in wide release on September 18, (Note: Its release had been delayed in order to film a new ending.) succeeded at the box office. The movie stayed in theaters through June of the next year; it also garnered six Academy Award nominations, including Best Picture. Twelve years later, in 1999, the similarly successful American Beauty, which had been in limited release through September before going wide in October, won that award and four others.

September's counterpart to Sundance, the Toronto International Film Festival, is held at the end of the month. The film community's attention is focused on the Canadian city. Critics gather to see potential Oscar contenders among the many independent films on the program and studio executives look to line up distribution deals with the same prize in mind. Some of the best are released within a week or so, ending the September dump period.

In past years, October also was when eagerly anticipated horror films reached screens, to capitalize on the approach of Halloween at the end of the month. However, this began to change in the 2000s due to the way series such as the Saw and Paranormal Activity films dominated that period, prompting distributors of other horror films to consider releasing them during the winter dump months instead. In 2012 Paramount enjoyed huge success with the unheralded The Devil Inside, released right after New Year's Day despite a strongly negative critical and audience reaction; the next year Mama was received enthusiastically by critics and filmgoers when it came out on Martin Luther King Day weekend after being rescheduled from the previous October to avoid going up against Sinister and Paranormal Activity 4. Only one major horror film, the third adaptation of Stephen King's Carrie, was released in October 2013, and it underperformed. "At your local multiplex, the spirit of Halloween is, sadly, dead," Matt Barone wrote in Complex. "Horror's now too big of a business for major studios to care much about October."

== Statistical analyses ==
The dump months' obstacles are reflected in their box office totals, particularly the success of movies opening during those months. January's strongest domestic opening weekend ever was the $90 million American Sniper took in when it went into wide release on Martin Luther King Day weekend in 2015. The best opening weekend for a movie seeing screens for the first time in January was the $42 million pulled in by Ride Along the year before; it is the lowest best opening weekend gross for any month. (Note: Based on standard two-day weekend totals. If the Martin Luther King Day holiday of Ride Along's opening weekend is included, its total opening weekend gross is $48.6 million, more than Hotel Transylvania 2.) September's best was the $48 million that Hotel Transylvania 2 took in following its 2015 release, until the 2017 adaptation of Stephen King's It eclipsed it with $123 million, August and February are fourth and fifth, respectively, with Suicide Squad at $133.7 million and Black Panther at $202 million respectively (the all-time champion is December, reflecting Spider-Man: No Way Home's $260 million it made during its 2021 opening weekend).

In January 2010, Metacritic editor Jason Dietz undertook a statistical analysis of whether films released in that month were, as perceived, inferior. He compared the site's aggregate scores, based on critical and audience consensus, for films released in January, February, and March from 2000 to 2009. January averaged the fewest releases of the three, and the lowest average scores. Of the 88 films released in the first month of the year during that decade, only six earned above a 61 average on the site's scale of 0 to 100, (Note: The scores given critical reviews are assigned by the website's staff, making them subjective.) the lowest of any of the three winter months, even accounting for the increase in releases as the spring becomes closer. It did not seem to Dietz as if there was any relationship between critical praise and audience enthusiasm for January films. The best-rated, Disney's 2004 animated musical Teacher's Pet, was a commercial failure, as was 2001's The Pledge. Cloverfield, the third entry, was a success, and behind it Freedom Writers had ridden its good reviews to do some modest box office in 2007; however How She Move had flopped that same year.

Conversely, some of the successful January releases did not meet with critical acclaim. Taken had been highly successful at the end of the month in 2009 despite reviews that ranged across the spectrum. And two weeks before that film's release, the universally panned comedy Paul Blart: Mall Cop had opened strong on its way to a total take over $150 million, beating the previous year's Cloverfield for the highest-grossing January movie until Bad Boys for Life 12 years later.

Contemplating the offerings for January 2013, Adam Raymond at Vulture undertook a ranking of a quarter-century of Januarys based on scores at Rotten Tomatoes (RT), another review aggregator. He averaged the ratings for all films released in a particular January, with the best and worst scores noted. By this method the best and worst Januarys were both in the earliest years for which the site kept scores. "[T]his could be more a result of the fact that far fewer movies used to be released then, so it took less to sway the average," Raymond noted.

The best January was also the first, 1987, whose 79% average was led by Woody Allen's acclaimed Radio Days. At 95%, it was also the best-rated January film during the survey period. That month's lowest-rated new release, Outrageous Fortune, still managed a 50% rating, better than the average for all but one of the other years.

At the other end was January 1989, where the 26% achieved by Gleaming the Cube and the 0% awarded to DeepStar Six bracketed a 16% average. Five other January films joined it at the bottom of the scale. It was recognized as a nadir among Januarys even at the time. In a contemporary essay in The New York Times after the month had concluded, an exasperated Janet Maslin presciently noted that "the January that has just ended really looks like one for the record books."

Among the 21st-century Januarys, 2011 did the best at 39%, led by The Way Back's 75%. The worst was 2003, when Final Destination 2 led the pack to a 23% average with its score of 47%. Kangaroo Jack brought up the rear at 8%.

Looking ahead to the movies of February 2014, Chris Kirk and Kim Thompson at Slate argued that February's movies were statistically the worst of any month. Their evidence was the average RT ratings for all movies for each month between 2000 and 2013. February's averaged 45%, three points lower than January and September and four below August. February also had the worst month in the entire sample period, with the 2001 releases from that month coming in at 31%; 2010 and 2012 tied for the best February at 54%.

No comparable analysis has ever been done on films released during the late-summer dump months. At the end of July 2008, Vulture again greeted the coming month with two posts on the drop in movie quality historically associated with the month, and its theories for what might explain that. One was a history of the previous 15 Augusts, with movies released in each month subjectively rated as "halfway-decent" or "lousy". It concluded that over that time there had been 169 lousy movies, and 26 halfway-decent ones. "That's 11.2 movies per August that make you want to claw your eyes out."

Most of the Augusts in the time period in question had one or two "halfway-decent" movies, with the other 9–11 movies discarded as "lousy". The exceptions were the consecutive years 1998–99. The former was regarded as the worst August, with no halfway-decent movies and all its releases (The Avengers, How Stella Got Her Groove Back and Halloween H20, among others) considered lousy. But in August 1999, there were five halfway-decent films: The Sixth Sense, The Thomas Crown Affair, The Iron Giant, Dick and Bowfinger.

== History ==
According to Burr, from the earliest days of the studio system major releases had largely followed the same calendar modern audiences would recognize, clustered during spring, summer, and the end-of-year holidays. "Yet January was still in the mix," he observes. "Silent-era Charlie Chaplin hits like The Kid (1921) and The Circus (1928), the Garbo/John Gilbert melodrama Flesh and the Devil (1927) and Josef von Sternberg's Last Command (1928) all came out during the first month of the year."

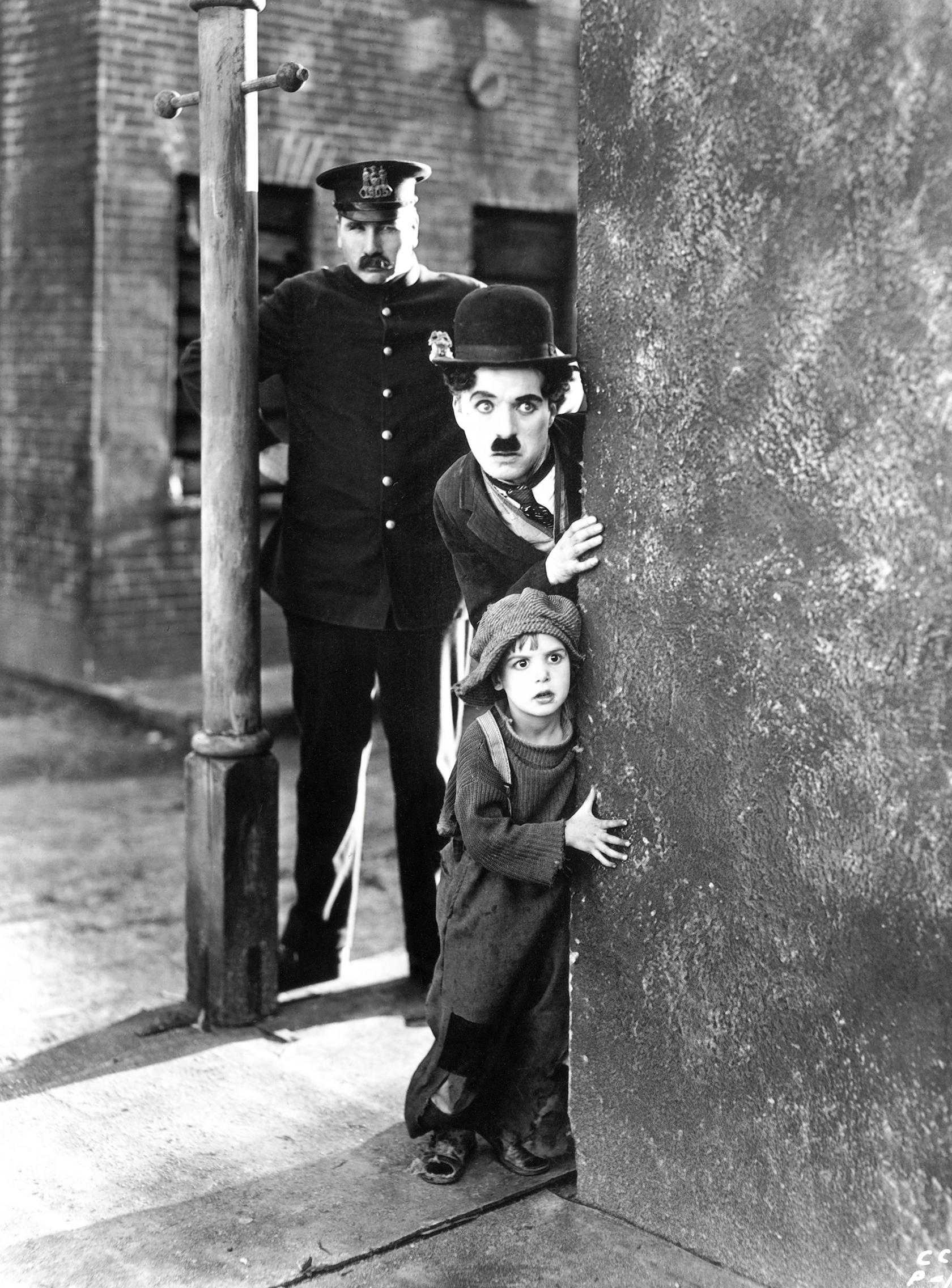
Charlie Chaplin in The Kid, a classic released in January 1921

The best decade for January movies, Burr writes, may well have been the 1940s. It began with what he suggests was the best January in cinema history. The Grapes of Wrath, His Girl Friday and The Shop Around the Corner, all considered classics, were released in January 1940. Later in the decade, other classic films would first reach screens during January, such as Sullivan's Travels, Shadow of a Doubt and The Treasure of the Sierra Madre.

A few months after Treasure's release, the U.S. Supreme Court handed down its decision in United States v. Paramount Pictures, Inc., holding that it was a violation of antitrust law for the studios to own theater chains as well. This has historically been seen as the beginning of the end of the studio system. Burr found that after it, with movies having less of a guaranteed box office since an adequate theatrical run was no longer a certainty, "release patterns began to clump more formally around big weekends, warmer weather and national holidays."

In the mid-1970s, the studios discovered the summer blockbuster via the success of Jaws and Star Wars. In the following decade the rise of independent producers dedicated to quality such as Merchant Ivory and Harvey Weinstein made the October–December the year's other highlight. But those two concentrations left the post-holiday winter and late summer as the lows that followed the highs. By the 2010s, Burr said, "August is death by ennui. And January is suicide." Similarly, The A.V. Club had noted at the same time, "over the past few decades, the American movie schedule has calcified ... January and February are when studios dump their discards, the movies they have low hopes for and want to disavow."

Producer Daniel Melnick, whose Altered States was moved up a month into the 1980 Christmas season by the studio over his objections, complained about this in an interview at the time. "I would rather go at a time when there are fewer people attending movies and offer them pictures they want to see, rather than to divide a larger audience with ten other desirable films ... [A]s an industry we have very often shown the instinct of lemmings ... We're all convinced that people go to the movies primarily at Christmas time, so we release our big pictures then ..."

By the end of that decade critics had taken notice as well. After January 1989, the month that Vulture would 24 years later find to be the movies' worst January ever, New York Times critic Janet Maslin had had enough. Her idea of "movie hell" she said, included among other indignities having to watch only January releases. "It's well known that January films have a character that is, let us say, distinctive ... What is it that leads film distributors to regard January as just the right resting place for so many flukes, black sheep, wild cards and also-rans?" She allowed that recent years had allowed some good films, such as Radio Days and El Norte, to get attention they might not have in other months of the year. However, that January had had as one its major releases The January Man, a thriller she characterized as aptly titled, despite not even being the worst the month had to offer (that dubious honor, she suggested, went to Deepstar Six).

Despite the critical and commercial success of The Silence of the Lambs in 1991, Burr qualified it as an exception that proved the rule. First, it had been released at the very end of January; and second, it had only gone into wide release two weeks later. Such a strategy is typical of January, Burr writes. "[It']s a studio's way of gritting its teeth and ripping off the Band-Aid."

The pattern of January as the slow month of the movie release calendar continued for almost three decades. January 2020 may have marked the beginning of a change with new extremes reached at both ends of the scale. Films such as Dolittle and The Turning followed the dump month pattern of poor critical reception and rescheduled releases after troubled and lengthy productions. At the end of the month, the Blake Lively action thriller The Rhythm Section pulled in just $2.7 million on its opening weekend, the worst opening weekend ever for a movie on 3,000 or more screens; after the take dropped to a million the next weekend Paramount pulled it from 2,955 of those screens, breaking a record set by The Darkest Minds in 2018. (Note: That record is for the most total screens dropped. The record for the largest portion of screens a film has been dropped from was set by February 2017's A Cure for Wellness, which went from 2,704 to 88 screens between its second and third weeks, for a 97.8 percent decline, compared to 97.5 percent for The Rhythm Section.) At the same time Bad Boys for Life had a $60 million opening weekend on its way to a $204.4 million worldwide gross, both new records for January releases, helped by favorable critical notice. Studios were beginning to see potential for commercial success in January.

But as the 2020 winter dump months were ending, the COVID-19 pandemic struck the world, and many exhibitors were forced to close, either by law or lack of demand, as patrons limited their activities outside of their homes to control the disease's spread. Studios and distributors reacted by postponing the release of highly anticipated tentpole films like A Quiet Place Part II and the James Bond film No Time to Die until such time as they could be screened in theaters.

For the rest of 2020, "every month was January", The Week's Jeva Lange wrote. This meant more releases of low-budget independent films like Dick Johnson Is Dead on streaming services like Netflix where they got the attention of audiences that otherwise might have missed them. Films that would likely have been expensive failures on the big screen such as Wild Mountain Thyme were also released to home audiences during the year. While Lange saw this as perhaps hastening the transition away from what January had been, she wrote at the beginning of 2021 that "January is going to be January", noting that week's British release of Peter Rabbit 2: The Runaway to critical condemnation. But later that year Shang-Chi and the Legend of the Ten Rings set new records for a Labor Day weekend release.

As the pandemic eased two years later, it appeared that some studios were picking up where they had left off in 2020 in reassessing their take on January releases. Sony / Columbia, for whom Bad Boys for Life had worked out so well, had scheduled Kraven the Hunter and Harold and the Purple Crayon, two major projects, for January 2023 releases (although both films would later be delayed to October 2023 and June 2023 respectively). Universal as well has announced an unidentified tentpole project for January 2024 release.

== Criticism ==
Some observers have suggested that studios and distributors' insistence on seasonal patterns of release is counterproductive. In a 2015 New Yorker article, James Surowiecki suggested that the lack of moveigoers' interest during the dump months may result from audiences' lowered expectations rather than any external factors: "[I]f you release blockbusters in July and dogs in January, no wonder people go to the movies more often in July."

Surowiecki cited a 2002 study by Stanford economist Liran Einav, who analyzed 15 years of ticket sales and found that while there is indeed a seasonal fluctuation in demand, it is not significant enough to validate the prevalent patterns of release; instead it seemed to him that distributors are responding to "the observed pattern of sales and not ... the estimated underlying demand." The cyclical variations in revenue, he found, result primarily from the clustering of highly anticipated releases during winter holiday season and the summertime.

A 2010 economic study of North American film release date patterns by two French economists, Manuel Cartier and Sébastien Liarte, agreed with Einav that the "temporal agglomeration" of potential blockbuster movies was not driven by realistic understanding of annual demand patterns. Instead, the authors came to believe that it was more socially driven, "normative mimicry whose end is to respect the beliefs, habits and norms of the [industry]." Exposing movies released at those times to films that could compete most effectively with them, they concluded, resulted in less overall profit for the studios than they might earn otherwise.

Industry insiders do not disagree with this assessment; in 2013, Viacom's then-chief executive officer, Philippe Dauman, said publicly that the clustering of tentpole releases was keeping those films from making all the money they could if they were not in such close competition. Ten years earlier, Tom Ortenberg, then head of distribution for Lionsgate Films, told The New York Times Magazine that "there is never a bad time to release a good film—and there is never a good time to release a bad film."

But Surowiecki noted Cartier and Liarte's conclusions that social factors within the industry played a part in the continuation of the release cycles that result in the dump months, due to the many uncertainties involved in producing and distributing a major motion picture and studio executives' desire to avoid blame for a big-budget film's commercial failure. "If you open a blockbuster on Memorial Day and it fails, no one is going to blame you for your release strategy", Einav, who in his paper likened this phenomenon to the maxim on Wall Street that no one ever gets fired for recommending investors buy shares of IBM, told him. "If you open a potential blockbuster in February and it fails you're going to be on the hook."

In 2013, John Fithian, president of the National Association of Theatre Owners (NATO), criticized the dump months (among several other studio practices) at CinemaCon, the annual gathering of film exhibitors hosted by NATO. The theaters had come off a first quarter where receipts had been down 12 percent from the first quarter of 2012. He faulted the studios for their insufficiently diverse offerings in 2013 as compared to the first quarter of the year before, which he connected to the dump-months phenomenon. "Any month can produce a $100 million movie," he said in his speech. "In 2012, distributors spread their movies over the calendar, and we had a record year."

Responding later, in an indieWIRE panel discussion hosted by Anne Thompson, Universal Studios chairman Adam Fogelson agreed in principle with Fithian, saying "there are very few reasons other than historical behavior why almost any film can't work on almost any weekend ...". He pointed to the 2005 success of White Noise on the first weekend of January as having opened that time up to similar low-budget horror films.

However, he called the belief among some exhibitors that the theaters' slump was attributable to a plethora of R-rated films saved for January, a criticism repeated by Fithian, "simplistic." The problem was the movies in question, not their ratings. Django Unchained, he insisted, would have been a hit regardless of the month it opened. "It happens to be about the movies," Fogelson said. "People tend to, if not forget, minimize how complicated this is."

Surowiecki credits another Universal executive, former distribution chief Nikki Rocco, for livening up the dump months. She, he wrote, believed that people would go see a movie at any time of year if it was good enough, and that that could make lesser movies hits if they came out at less competitive times of year. Not only did Rocco move apparent summer releases like 1999's The Mummy to the beginning of May, she also found success for the studio in August with The Bourne Ultimatum and scheduled Ride Along, Identity Thief and Safe House for what wound up being successful runs following January release dates. Surowiecki compared her to Billy Beane, former general manager of Major League Baseball's Oakland Athletics, who likewise found a way for a smaller, less wealthy team to compete at the highest levels by using analytics to identify undervalued assets.

== Releasing strategies ==
Critics and movie fans have observed that studios and other distributors have leaned on particular types of movies, or particular genres, to get them through the dump months. Some of them overlap:

- "Mediocre comedies", as Scott Meslow of The Atlantic puts it, referring to films like The Spy Next Door, Tooth Fairy, Bride Wars, Hotel for Dogs and parody films of Jason Friedberg and Aaron Seltzer−particularly Date Movie and Meet the Spartans−all of which had tepid critical receptions but did better than they might have at other times of year. In the 2010s, these films have been doing even better, with Paul Blart: Mall Cop and Identity Thief both vaulting past unimpressed critics to gross over $100 million; the former was the top-grossing January release for 12 years.
- "Mediocre action movies". Meslow points to The Book of Eli and Underworld: Evolution as films that, like their comic counterparts, succeeded commercially due to their January release. In 2011, he adds, rescheduling The Green Hornet to January from its originally intended release the previous summer proved to be a very lucrative decision. A decade earlier, in a piece about his general complaints with August, Slate editor David Plotz included "egregious action movies" dominating movie screens during the month."
- Low-cost rereleases: In 2011, Meslow recounts, Disney rereleased The Lion King in 3-D to test whether its core audience would be amenable to the format. The experiment wound up becoming the highest-grossing September release ever. It followed it up with Beauty and the Beast in 3-D, released the following January. George Lucas primed audiences for the Star Wars prequel trilogy by releasing the enhanced "Special Edition" of the original trilogy during the winter dump months, Meslow recalled.
- Low budgets, generally: Taken and Paul Blart's stars, Liam Neeson and Kevin James respectively, are not considered A-listers, bankable enough to open a major movie on the strength of their names alone. Therefore, Meslow writes, they work for lower salaries, which helps keep budgets low enough for the film to be profitable with a smaller potential audience amid minimal competition.
- Teen-oriented movies. Since teenagers, "the demographic with an excess of idle time in January," are less interested in movies touted as potential Oscar winners than adults, Meslow reasons, studios make the effort to release films targeted to them. So, romantic films like She's All That, 10 Things I Hate About You, Save the Last Dance, The Butterfly Effect, and A Walk to Remember have successfully opened in January.

Not all films released in the dump months were originally intended for that period, however. Movies that failed to live up to studios' hopes for a competitive summer release often come out in the winter. Vegas Seven's Una LaMarche pointed at the beginning of 2013 to the then-upcoming Hansel & Gretel: Witch Hunters as such a film. "If [it] were any good," she wrote, "it would be coming out in June." It indeed fared poorly in the U.S., but better abroad.

She also suspected that Broken City, another upcoming release that starred Russell Crowe, Catherine Zeta-Jones and Mark Wahlberg, had been consigned to a January release due to adverse reactions from test audiences, and correctly anticipated the failure of the ensemble comedy Movie 43 for the same reason. For his part, Meslow points to Season of the Witch, a $40 million horror film starring Nicolas Cage which failed to recoup even that amount, and Untraceable as emblematic of that kind of big-budget bust buried during dump months. "The marketing plan for a film like this is often just a formal wake, the last stop before a film's reincarnation as generic product for the on-demand/DVD/streaming after-markets," says Burr in his Times Magazine piece.

Others that were not originally intended for the dump months get shifted there anyway not because they are bad but because the studios cannot figure out how to market them or are not sure they will succeed. C. Robert Cargill, a former critic for Ain't It Cool News who scripted the successful 2012 horror film Sinister, points to Chronicle, which had a surprisingly strong opening on Super Bowl weekend earlier that year, an example.

Similarly, LaMarche points to two other types of movies difficult to market to large audiences. "Winter can be a boon to little movies with niche audiences," she writes, pointing to Dustin Hoffman's directorial debut, Quartet, which received a limited U.S. release in January 2013, and Struck by Lightning, released at the same time. Movies that also blend genres or defy such categorization, such as the zombie–human Romeo and Juliet retelling, Warm Bodies, or the limited-release Charlie Sheen comedy A Glimpse Inside the Mind of Charles Swan III, are also ideal for their dump-months release time frame.

=== August ===
Guardians of the Galaxy had the most successful August opening weekend ever, until 2016's Suicide Squad. It went on to become the highest grossing August release ever as well as 2014's top-grossing film domestically. These accomplishments led industry observers to reconsider whether they should be so dismissive of August, a trend that had been building even before that year. Cary Carling noted afterwards in the Fort Worth Star-Telegram that recent Augusts had seen a number of critical and commercial successes, not only franchise movies such as The Bourne Ultimatum and Rise of the Planet of the Apes but films that appealed to adult audiences such as Blue Jasmine, The Help, and the James Brown biopic Get on Up, whose $14 million opening weekend against Guardians "met expectations."

"[Is] the summer movie season ... expanding out from its traditional boundaries?" Jordan Smith asked before the month began on Hollywood.com. He noted that some big-budget movies released in the late spring and early summer of recent years, like After Earth, White House Down, R.I.P.D. and The Lone Ranger, had struggled at the box office against similar competition. He believed a "point of saturation" had been reached, with too many of those movies being released in the early summer. But "audiences are proving that they'll line up at any time of the year to watch Captain America save the day."

Dave Farger of Fandango.com believes moviegoers are already adapting. When a film like Guardians of the Galaxy comes out at the time of summer it does, "[it] feels like an event, regardless of the month." He sees it as similar to what has happened to the TV schedule, where both broadcast and cable networks have begun airing new scripted shows during the summer, which was once relegated to reruns due to small audiences.

Hopes for more success in late August are dependent, however, on new releases during the month. In 2017, with only two new studio films in wide release that August, the last weekend of the month yielded the worst box office results in 16 years, with all films taking in only $65 million, led by The Hitman's Bodyguard, at $10.1 million in receipts, for the second straight week. Around $1.7 million of the total came from Wonder Woman, rereleased to promote its upcoming home media debut.

=== Horror films ===
One genre regularly mentioned in connection with the dump months is horror. Once a staple of the periods, yet frequently limited to them, recent successes during the dump months have actually led studios to reevaluate this scheduling limitation and release horror movies at other times of the year. "It seems this time of the year has become the 'other October.'" said Brian Salisbury of Hollywood.com at the end of February 2013. LaMarche attributes this to winter's "cold, dark landscape."

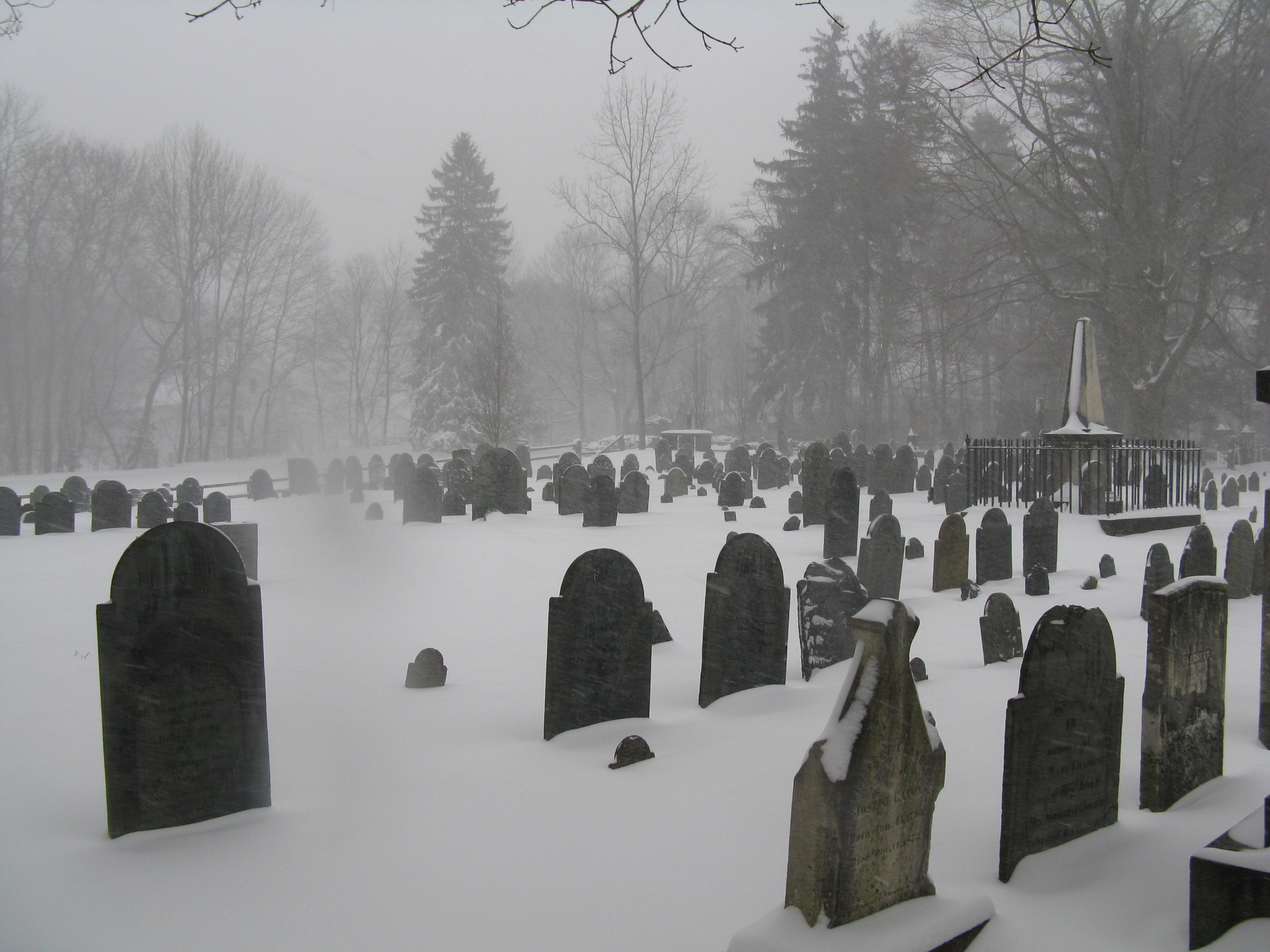
Winter's dreariness may make audiences more amenable to horror films during that season's dump months.

Critically praised and commercially successful horror films such as 2008's Cloverfield, which had the best January opening weekend for six years until Ride Along, and 2013's January champion Mama, have done well by the dump months. But other horror movies have still succeeded in the face of critical condemnation, starting with White Noise in 2005. As a result, "the only new release is usually one crappy horror movie," on the year's first weekend, says Will Goss of Film.com.

In reviewing 2016's The Forest, David Ehrlich of Slate took note of its release at that time of year. "[A]nybody with access to a calendar already knows that The Forest is bad," he wrote. "[A]t this point, that's less of a presumption than it is a tradition." In that vein, playing on the movie's Japanese setting, he likened it to the supposed ancient custom of ubasute in that country, by which elderly people who could no longer care for themselves were purposely abandoned on mountainsides.

In 2012, The Devil Inside, a low-budget found footage horror film following in the steps of Cloverfield, opened the weekend after New Year's Day. Critics, for whom it had not been screened, reviewed it harshly if and when they did see it, and audiences reacted angrily to the film's abrupt ending, which directed them to a website for more information. Yet, as Cargill notes, its success was proof that even on that low-potential weekend, a disengaged audience will "throw money at a terrible movie if it looks like it's good." The film's opening weekend take of $33.7 million ranks in the top ten for January. The Devil Inside went on to make over $50 million domestically and almost that much abroad to break $100 million in total receipts.

The success of both films outside of October, usually the month when studios released their quality horror films to capitalize on Halloween's approach, has actually led studios to rethink that approach and release horror films at other times of year. During the 2000s October, and the weekend before Halloween, had come to be dominated by the Saw and Paranormal Activity franchises. "You would never come up against them because you would be killed," recalls Rock Alvarez, producer of A Haunted House 2.

For that reason, Mama was rescheduled from October 2012 to the following January. In October 2013, Paramount decided to delay the release of Paranormal Activity: The Marked Ones from the weekend before Halloween to March 2014, and replaced it not with another horror offering but the comedy Jackass Presents: Bad Grandpa, leaving the month with only one highly anticipated horror film, the third adaptation of Stephen King's Carrie.

Tiffany Smith of Fandango.com's House of Screams says studios are finding holidays with horror associations elsewhere in the year, like Friday the 13th, regardless of season. Insidious: Chapter 2 had actually opened well on that weekend in September. "That weekend actually played as a bigger movie weekend than Halloween is this year," she told USA Today. In July, The Conjuring had also done well amidst the summer movies. "A lot of people are moving [horror movies] everywhere," said Mama producer Guillermo del Toro.

== Audience and critical responses ==
Some movie critics have called on the studios to change their release schedules and improve the quality of new films during the dump months. Paul Shirey of JoBlo.com calls on the studios start releasing better films then. "Rather than saving them to win statues, why not put them out to reap some box office and fill an otherwise dead month with something worth seeing?"

Ty Burr suggested that in January 2013 that no new movies should be released in January. Instead, "studios would have to rerelease their most underrated entertainments from the previous year for a second chance." He gave The Cabin in the Woods or Chronicle, itself a January release in 2012, as examples of such films. Failing that happening, he wrote that he was using home media to catch up on older films.

Other critics have tried to look for worthwhile, overlooked films amid the dump-months releases, which do exist, Vegas Seven's Una LaMarche assures readers. In January 2013, The Onion's A.V. Club compiled a list of such overlooked dump months films. It includes many that have since become cult classics, like the 1991 Kevin Bacon horror film Tremors, 1999's Office Space and 2000's Boiler Room, all released in late February. They also recommend the January 1993 release Matinee, starring John Goodman as legendary gimmick-using film producer William Castle, and The Pledge, a January 2001 film starring Jack Nicholson. "It is Sean Penn's best film as director, an uncompromising depiction of faith and devotion curdled into something monstrous."

One critic, Matt Singer of indieWIRE, said in January 2013 that he has "started to look at January with anticipation rather than dread." He argues that even the month's bad movies are bad in their own way. Unlike failed summer blockbusters, which have "way too much money riding on [them] to be anything but mediocre and boring," January movies are often spectacular in their failure since the studios do not expect them to do well. "Why throw good money after bad?" he asks rhetorically. "Just cut your losses and let the thing really suck." Such benign neglect, he suggests, led to The Devil Inside, "so intensely stupid it's almost brilliant—and entirely entertaining." He likened January movies to trainwrecks, while bad movies in June were more like "controlled demolitions." Cloverfield, he asserted, had begun reversing the trend of forgettable January movies. In more recent years he had been impressed by The Grey and Mama.

"While it's easy to complain about a stretch of so-so movies," wrote Matt Patches at Hollywood.com as 2012 began, "the twist is we should really be thanking the studios for catering to niche audiences all month." For most viewers, it is a chance to catch up on the major awards contenders released in December. But studios and the filmgoers who have already seen those two films can benefit from creative risk-taking by filmmakers. He points to Cloverfield as one such gamble that succeeded. Smaller film distributors also take advantage of the dump months to bring little-seen but highly praised films like Kill List to wider audiences via home-media releases.

Scott Mendelson at Forbes said in January 2014 that only critics in large markets have reason to complain during the dump months. "For the rest" he claimed "January is in fact a deluge of high quality movies" owing to the combination of awards contenders reaching the mass market for the first time, the possibility for unusual successes among the new releases, and overlooked films from the previous year reaching home markets. In that last category, he highly recommended the August 2013 release Short Term 12.

== In other markets ==
Until 2010, the Chinese film industry also experienced sluggish domestic ticket sales during January and February, when that country celebrates the traditional New Year, or today the Spring Festival. That year, James Cameron's Avatar earned US$16 million in one week during that period, leading Chinese filmmakers to reconsider whether audiences were as disinterested in going to theaters at that time of year than they had long believed. They began to make movies that might succeed during this period, realizing that the country's recent economic growth had given people more leisure time.

Since then, that period has become more profitable. Most of the successful films have been domestic productions—no Hollywood production has been released in China during the Spring Festival since Frozen in 2014. A Chinese critic told the Los Angeles Times that she believes Hollywood deliberately refrains from releasing its major films in her country during this time since they now know the market will be saturated with high-profile domestic films, much as China itself informally excludes foreign-made films from the summer months.

In February 2018 the Spring Festival period set new box office records for China. It had its highest-grossing week ever, at CN¥5.65 billion (US$890 million); its highest single-day gross (US$200 million), and its highest attendance ever, with 30 million going to theaters at some point during the week in mid-month. Monster Hunt 2 set the country's opening weekend record with receipts of CN¥550 million (US$86 million).

== See also ==
- Bounded rationality, constraint on decision-making that may be one of the reasons for the persistence of the dump months
- Friday night death slot, the equivalent to the dump months on the American weekly television schedule
