= All the King's Men (2006 film) =

2006 film by Steven Zaillian

- Theatrical release poster
- Directed by: Steven Zaillian
- Screenplay by: Steven Zaillian
- Based on: All the King's Men; 1946 novel by Robert Penn Warren
- Produced by: Mike Medavoy; Arnold W. Messer; Ken Lemberger; Steven Zaillian
- Starring: Sean Penn; Jude Law; Kate Winslet; James Gandolfini; Mark Ruffalo; Patricia Clarkson; Anthony Hopkins
- Cinematography: Paweł Edelman
- Edited by: Wayne Wahrman
- Music by: James Horner
- Production companies: Columbia Pictures; Relativity Media; Phoenix Pictures
- Distributed by: Sony Pictures Releasing
- Release date: September 22, 2006
- Running time: 128 minutes
- Country: United States
- Language: English
- Budget: $55 million
- Box office: $9.5 million

All the King's Men is a 2006 American political drama film written, directed and produced by Steven Zaillian based on the 1946 Pulitzer Prize–winning novel of the same name by Robert Penn Warren. All the King's Men had previously been adapted into a Best Picture Oscar–winning film by writer-director Robert Rossen in 1949. The film narrates the rise to power and demise of the Governor Willie Stark (played by Sean Penn), taking his office in the American South. The fictional character is loosely based on the life of Louisiana governor Huey Long, in office between 1928 through 1932. Elected as a U.S. senator, he was assassinated in 1935. The film co-stars Jude Law, Kate Winslet, Anthony Hopkins, James Gandolfini, Mark Ruffalo, Patricia Clarkson, Jackie Earle Haley and Frederic Forrest in his final film appearance.

Produced by Columbia Pictures in association with Phoenix Pictures and Relativity Media, All the King's Men was released in the United States on September 22, 2006, by Sony Pictures Releasing. The film received negative reviews from critics and was a box-office bomb, grossing $9.5 million against a $55 million budget.

== Plot ==
Jack Burden, a Louisianan news reporter, takes a personal interest in Willie Stark, an idealistic small-town lawyer and parish treasurer. Circumstances develop that result in Tiny Duffy, a local political leader Burden knows, urging Stark to run for governor. Burden's upbringing makes him familiar with the undercurrent of politics – he was raised by his loving godfather Judge Irwin, a former state attorney general, while his good friend, Dr. Adam Stanton, and his sister Anne Stanton—also Burden's former lover—are the children of a former governor. Burden therefore decides to take Duffy's advice and travels as a reporter on Stark's campaign for governor.

The politically astute Burden soon deduces, and Duffy's strategist (and Stark's mistress), Sadie Burke, confirms that Duffy is using Stark to split his party's vote and thus allow the opposing party to win. They tell Stark, who begins to give speeches in a straightforward manner to appeal to the public, in defiance of the advice given to him by Duffy. His vigorous strategy attacks the corruption of the existing players and promises schools and roads for his "fellow ignorant hicks", resulting in Stark winning the election. He manages Duffy by making him his lieutenant governor. Stark recruits Burden to work for him as an adviser.

Stark proves to be a very persuasive governor, delivering on many of his new projects. Irwin disapproves of Stark and publicly supports an investigation of possible graft in the new spending. Burden points out that graft is the elite's word for what the previous politicians had always done, while Stark openly tells his crowds that his "crooks, unlike theirs, are itty bitty" compared to the elite's. Stark convinces Stanton to head a new public hospital while he begins having an affair with Anne, provoking Burke's jealousy and Burden's disappointment.

Irwin continues criticizing Stark as political controversies begin to unfold. Stark demands that Burden seek information on the judge to be used against him. Jack insists that there is no such information, but eventually discovers evidence of a bribe that Irwin used to get his appointment many years prior, leading an opponent to commit suicide. Following this revelation, Irwin himself commits suicide. Burden's mother then tells him that Irwin treated him with such love because he was his biological father, which causes a great amount of guilt for Burden.

Stark uses many methods of corruption to consolidate his power, including patronage and intimidation. Adam is told that Stark is using the hospital project to rob the state and is framing him in the process. Burden and Anne both assure Adam that this is false. Adam also becomes enraged when he learns of Stark's affair with his sister. Adam waits at the state capitol and assassinates Stark, only to be immediately killed by the governor's bodyguard. It is later revealed that Adam was influenced by Duffy and Burke to murder Stark, allowing Duffy to succeed Stark as governor.

== Cast ==
Jude Law (left) and Sean Penn in the film

- Sean Penn as Willie Stark
- Jude Law as Jack Burden
  - Joshua Davis as young Jack
- Kate Winslet as Anne Stanton
  - Carrie Christmann as young Anne
- James Gandolfini as Tiny Duffy
- Patricia Clarkson as Sadie Burke
- Mark Ruffalo as Adam Stanton
  - Montgomery John as young Adam
- Anthony Hopkins as Judge Irwin
- Kathy Baker as Rachel Burden
- Jackie Earle Haley as Roderick "Sugar Boy" Ellis
- Kevin Dunn as Alex Fauntleroy
- Tom McCarthy as Mr. Henley
- Glenn Morshower as Commissioner Sherman
- Frederic F. Forrest as Donald Stark
- Tom Aldredge as Carruthers' Banker
- Michael Cavanaugh as Dr. Peyton
- Talia Balsam as Lucy Stark
- Travis Champagne as Tom Stark
- Jay Patterson as Senator Kruczemark
- Caroline Lagerfelt as Mrs. Peyton
- Eileen Ryan as Lily Littlepaugh
- Gary Grubbs as Sheriff Boyle

== Production ==
Filming took place in New Orleans, Morgan City, Donaldsonville, at the Louisiana State Capitol in Baton Rouge and many other places in Louisiana.

Filming was completed in April 2005 and the film was due for release on December 16, 2005 but in October 2005 Sony decided to postpone the release to the following year.

The film garnered strong Oscar "buzz" and was considered a contender by Entertainment Weekly even before its initial opening.

The world premiere was held at the Toronto International Film Festival on September 11, 2006, where the film was first screened to the press. A special screening was held at the Tulane University in New Orleans on September 16, 2006.

== Reception ==
=== Box office ===
All the King's Men grossed $7.2 million in the United States and Canada, and $2.2 million in other territories, for a worldwide total of $9.5 million, against a production budget of $50 million.

In the film's opening weekend it made $3.7 million from 1,514 theaters, finishing seventh. It then dropped to 11th place with a gross of $1.5 million in its second weekend, and by its third weekend fell to 27th place with $285,993.

=== Critical response ===
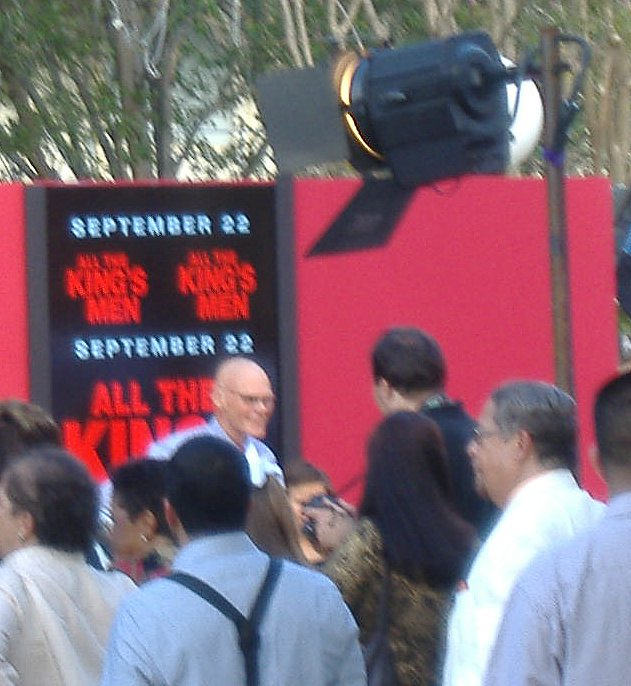
James Carville, executive producer, at the film's premiere.

Despite its high-profile cast, direction and production team, All the King's Men was a massive failure, both with critics and at the box office. On Rotten Tomatoes, the film holds approval rating of 12% based on 158 reviews, with an average rating of 4.30/10. The website's critics consensus reads: "With a scenery-chewing performance from Sean Penn, an absence of political insight, and an overall lack of narrative cohesiveness, these Men give Oscar bait a bad name." On Metacritic, the film has a weighted average score of 37 out of 100, based on 37 critics, indicating "generally unfavorable" reviews. Audiences polled by CinemaScore gave the film an average grade of "B−" on an A+ to F scale.

A. O. Scott of The New York Times expressed disappointment with the film: "Nothing in the picture works. It is both overwrought and tedious, its complicated narrative bogging down in lyrical voiceover, long flashbacks and endless expository conversations between people speaking radically incompatible accents." Michael Medved gave All the King's Men two stars (out of four) calling it "depressing and disappointing", a "stodgy melodrama" and a "pointless, pretentious, plodding period-piece".

Richard Roeper also gave the film a less than stellar review. Michael Phillips put it on his Worst of 2006 list.

Some reviews were positive. Richard Schickel of Time magazine liked the movie, arguing that "it's much more faithful to the tone of the novel" than the original. Kenneth Turan (Los Angeles Times) praised the film's "undeniable moral seriousness" and the actors' "exceptional ensemble work." He argued that Zaillian's script and direction "expertly extracted the core of this greatest of American political novels, a work that is both of its time and outside it."

== Aftermath ==
Zaillian was stunned by the poor critical and box-office results of this film, which opened with only $3.8 million and barely made $7.2 million at the end of its run in US theaters. Another new wide release from the same weekend, the $11.5 million sequel Jackass Number Two, made $28.1 million. In an interview with the Los Angeles Times, Zaillian said that the film's poor performance was "like getting hit by a truck. ... I don't know what to make of it. ... We're all a bit shellshocked. I feel like Huey Long must have felt -- you try to do good and they shoot you for it."

== Soundtrack ==
The film's score was composed and conducted by James Horner, who had previously worked with Zaillian on Searching For Bobby Fischer, and performed by the Hollywood Studio Symphony.

All the King's Men

Film score by James Horner
- Released: September 27, 2007
- Length: 56:42
- Label: Varèse Sarabande
- Producers: Simon Rhodes and James Horner

James Horner chronology
The New World (2005)	All the King's Men (2007)	Apocalypto (2006)

Professional ratings
Review scores
Source	Rating
Filmtracks	3/5 stars
Movie Music UK	5/5 stars
Movie Wave	4/5 stars
ScoreNotes	7/10 stars
SoundtrackNet	4.5/5 stars

- "Main Title" – 4:30
- "Time Brings All Things to Light" – 1:45
- "Give Me the Hammer and I'll NAIL 'EM UP!" – 5:59
- "Bring Down the Lion and the Rest of the Jungle Will Quake in Fear" – 3:34
- "Conjuring the 'Hick' Vote" – 3:14
- "Anne's Memories" – 2:47
- "Adam's World" – 3:43
- "Jack's Childhood" – 2:22
- "The Rise to Power" – 3:17
- "Love's Betrayal" – 2:54
- "Only Faded Pictures" – 2:49
- "As We Were Children Once" – 2:49
- "Verdict and Punishment" – 6:00
- "All Our Lives Collide" – 3:23
- "Time Brings All Things to Light... I Trust It So" – 7:36

== See also ==
- Politics in fiction
- Oscar season
- List of box office bombs
