= Hammocking =

Broadcast programming technique

Hammocking is a technique used in broadcast programming whereby an unpopular television program is scheduled between two popular ones in the hope that viewers will watch it, using the analogy of a hammock hanging between two strong and established trees. Also related is the concept of tent-pole programming, or using popular, well-established television shows scheduled in pivotal time periods to boost the ratings of the shows around them. Used especially for new shows, hammocking is limited to prime time, where "appointment television" is strong.

The main theory in play is that audiences are less likely to change channels for a single time slot. Presupposing that there are three available time slots, the weakest show would, under a hammocking strategy, be placed in the middle slot so that its lead-in, the show that airs before it, is a series popular enough to create a coattail effect when a viewer leaves the television on the same station; to keep people watching, another popular series is positioned in the lead-out slot after the weak show, so the viewer has reduced incentive to change the channel. These strategies depend on the general phenomenon of audience flow. The strength of the final program then presumably leads into the late local news, followed by late night programming, with the hope the channel remains unchanged after bedtime to allow a network affiliate television station to have strong ratings for its morning newscast leading into the network's morning show. This creates a halo effect with the schedule in general to build network and affiliate station loyalty with a viewer.

Public broadcasting also uses this as a way to promote serious but valuable content. Hammocking may lead to situations where even if programs remain weak, audience rating will be high. However, there is a risk. If the middle show is too weak, the audience could change the channel altogether even if they “would have stayed if the two popular programs had formed a block.”

Hammocking has been fairly reliable over the years. It was largely discovered by accident in the late 1950s: Michael Dann is credited with developing the concept after December Bride, thought to be a major hit at the time, under-performed when it lost its lead-in, I Love Lucy.

Trying to hammock programs that have little in common with each other can have unusual consequences: TNBC, a block of programming NBC carried during the 1990s that had been aimed at teenagers, had a lead-in from Weekend Today, a news program targeting those teens' parents. By the end of TNBC's run, after the block's teen viewership had declined, the average age of those recognized by the Nielsens as watching TNBC was 41 years old, driven mainly by the lead-in from Weekend Today.

British network ITV used a hammocking strategy for its game show event series Red or Black?, under which each episode in its first season consisted of a pre-recorded segment and a live final round, with a second program (such as The X Factor) aired in between. The British comedy Britain's Got the Pop Factor... and Possibly a New Celebrity Jesus Christ Soapstar Superstar Strictly on Ice used hammocking for comedic effect in support of its satire of reality talent competition shows, with its two parts (which depict the final performance and results shows of a singing competition) being hammocked on its Channel 4 premiere by a documentary on the special's creator Peter Kay.

In some cases, the middle show becomes a hit. NBC used this strategy for years with its Must See TV Thursday night schedule, where the strong series on the night, Friends, Seinfeld, Frasier, Will & Grace and ER, provided two half-hour hammock spots in the night where newer sitcoms were positioned in order to provide strength throughout the night and build the network's bench on other nights if they proved successful. Many of the programs were critically derided for poor writing and acting and "floating by" on the ratings of other shows (The Single Guy and Union Square being the most prominent and higher-rated examples). So dominant was Must See TV, that a common industry joke of that era was the comparison of the hammocked shows to NBC instead placing a test pattern in the half-hour between the end of one top-of-the-hour show and the start of the other, and garnering equivalent ratings for much less effort and cost.

The WB had a similar experiment with an hour of hammocking on Mondays after 7th Heaven and before the local news or off net syndicated programming. Examples of 7th Heaven/local program hammocking include Savannah, Buffy the Vampire Slayer (until it was moved out of the hammock spot in 1998), Three, Kelly Kelly, Alright Already, Hyperion Bay, Rescue 77, Safe Harbor, the second season of Zoe, Brutally Normal, Roswell (until its move to UPN), Angel (until it was moved out of the hammock spot in 2002), Just Legal, Related and Runaway. The sole exception is Everwood, because the show draws much more of an audience with 7th Heaven than the hammock programs.

In the 2003–04 season, NBC experimented with a new hammocking format with Donald Trump's The Apprentice, which aired between Friends and ER. "Much was made of the ratings for The Apprentice, but in truth, even in its protected spot, it lost almost 4 points compared with the Friends lead-in and 2 points compared with ER. Moreover, when moved to the unprotected Wednesday night slot, it dropped into the bottom third of the ratings."

NBC's effort to hammock The Jay Leno Show between its prime time lineup and local affiliates' late local news was a failure, as the late local newscasts saw massive ratings declines, as did the shows following those late local newscasts, particularly The Tonight Show with Conan O'Brien. The resulting dispute led to Leno being given back The Tonight Show's time slot, and the brand as well after an unhappy O'Brien left NBC in February to start his own series on TBS.

Recently, ABC attempted to hammock programming after Modern Family and a drama after (in this case, either Revenge, Designated Survivor, or A Million Little Things), to middling or little success. More recently, CBS made an attempt to hammock programming between NCIS and NCIS: New Orleans, which proved somewhat successful. Examples include Bull (a series featuring former NCIS regular Michael Weatherly) and FBI (which launched a Most Wanted spin-off as a hammock end to the Tuesday evening schedule at the start of 2020).

The Super Bowl has regularly been used as an opportunity to take advantage of the massive lead-out audience the game produces. Through the early 1990s, most attempts to launch new series in the slot had been failures, after which networks became more likely to air highly-anticipated episodes or premieres of an already-established series rather than series premieres (although there have still been exceptions to this practice). During the Super Bowl itself, the Super Bowl halftime show is a hammocking event; until the early 1990s, the Super Bowl halftime consisted of conventional halftime show fare such as marching bands and troupes such as Up with People. More effective counterprogramming against Super Bowl halftime beginning in 1992 forced the National Football League to treat the halftime as a more serious matter, and from 1993 onward, the slot was given to concerts by major pop stars, a tradition that has continued for three decades after. Beginning in 1997, the NFL expanded its halftime concert strategy to its Thanksgiving contests, themselves the most-watched regular season games. By 2026, the NFL had grown confident enough in the strength of the Super Bowl's domestic ratings and the unlikelihood of a major counterprogramming attempt that it shifted its focus to acts it hoped would expand the global audience, controversially choosing Bad Bunny (a Spanish language reggaeton/trap artist whose international following is stronger than his domestic) to headline the Super Bowl LX halftime show. The choice indeed drew a modestly successful counterprogram in the form of the All-American Halftime Show, a country music concert that diverted several million viewers away from the official halftime show.

== See also ==
- List of Super Bowl lead-out programs
