= Season finale =

Final episode of a television series season

A season finale (British English: series finale; Australian English: season final) is the final episode of a season of a television program. This is often the final episode to be produced for a few months or longer, and, as such, will attempt to attract viewers to continue watching when the series begins again.

A season finale may contain a cliffhanger ending to be resolved in the next season. Alternatively, a season finale could bring storylines to a close, "going out on a high" and similarly maintaining interest in the series' eventual return.

== Mid-season finale ==
In the 2000s, the terms "mid-season finale", "fall finale" or "winter finale" began being used by television broadcasters in the United States to denote the last episode before a mid-season hiatus, often for the holiday season. As with a season finale, a mid-season finale can include a major plot development, or a cliffhanger ending that will be resolved when the series returns. Winter/Fall finales are often used by networks to draw attention and encourage viewership of such episodes as event television, especially if they fall during the November sweeps period. The practice has faced criticism for affecting the structure and narrative of broadcast television programs, as writers may be coerced by broadcasters into placing cliffhangers and plot developments in midseason episodes, rather than allow a plot to build up to a traditional season finale.

== Series finale ==
The final episode of a television series often concludes the entire premise of the show, wrapping up any loose ends and storylines. On occasion, the season finale has become the series finale due to cancellation of the series, sometimes unexpectedly so, leaving plot points unresolved.

== In sports ==
In American English, the term has evolved to describe the final event of a sporting season, e.g. in soccer or motocross, perhaps partly because of the popularity of these with television viewers.

== See also ==
- Season premiere
- Series premiere
- Series finale
