= Set piece =

Film scene or sequence

In film production, a set piece is a scene or sequence of scenes whose execution requires complex logistical planning and considerable expenditure of money.

== Origin and usage of the term ==
In its original meaning, the term is used to label scenes that require a whole new set of stage scenery to be built. Most early movies were shot in large studios, with potentially expensive sets. When a screenplay would require a new set to be built, filmmakers would often make the scene a high point of the movie to justify the expense. According to Adam O'Brien, a set piece is "a sequence in a film when we are invited to appreciate (if not consciously consider) the logistical efforts of the filmmaking process, including design, performance and recording."

The term is often used broadly to describe a sequence in which the film-maker's elaborate planning is considered to allow for the maximum pay-off for the audience, such as a thrilling action sequence or awe-inspiring science-fiction sequence. The term is often used to describe any scenes that are so essential to a film that they could not be edited out or skipped in the shooting schedule without seriously detracting from the enjoyability, intensity, impact, coherence or memorability of the finished work. Often, screenplays are written around a list of such set pieces, particularly in high-budget "event movies". The term is sometimes extended to refer to cinematic portions in video games.

A set piece may or may not be integral to the plot. A James Bond film usually begins with a set piece that has little relation to the main plot of the film. On the other hand, a dramatic film may have set pieces at major plot points, providing dramatic pay-off, resolution, or transition.

== Production ==
Set pieces are very often planned meticulously using storyboards, screen-tests, and rehearsals, in contrast to smaller scenes where the director and actors may be more improvisational. Each action requires the combined efforts of different departments: set builders, physical effects, and special visual effects. On most films, different groups of people will work on different set pieces individually since they can take a long time to prepare before shooting. For example, the car chase in The Matrix Reloaded took months to prepare and cost $30 million, including $5 million to build the freeway set.

== Examples ==
Notable examples of set pieces include the Snake Pit in Raiders of the Lost Ark, the final road chase of Mad Max 2, the Death Star Trench Run from Star Wars, the storming of the volcano lair in the James Bond film You Only Live Twice, the burning oil rig in There Will Be Blood, the Taj Mahal in Jungle Fever, and the Tyrannosaurus escape in Jurassic Park. Alfred Hitchcock referred to set pieces as crescendoes or "bumps" and tried to put three of them in each of his movies. In Psycho, these are the shower murder, the murder on the stairs, and the discovery of "Mother". One of the most well known set pieces is the "Ride of the Valkyries" helicopter attack scene in Apocalypse Now whose planning was shown in Hearts of Darkness: A Filmmaker's Apocalypse.
