= Season premiere =

First episode of a television series season

A season premiere is the first episode of a new season of a returning television show. In the United States, many season premieres are aired in the fall time or, for mid-season replacements, either in the spring or late winter.

In countries such as Australia and the United Kingdom, a season premiere can be broadcast at any time of the year. In Australia, the premieres of several shows are in mid- to late summer, late January or early February.

== Mid-season premiere ==
In the 2000s, the terms "mid-season premiere", "winter premiere", and "spring premiere" began being used by television broadcasters in the United States to denote the first episode after a mid-season hiatus, often following the holiday season leading into spring and summer months. As with a season/series premiere, a mid-season premiere can include a major plot development, cast change, or resolution to a cliffhanger ending that featured in the "mid-season finale" in order for networks to draw attention and encourage viewership of such episodes as event television. The practice has faced criticism for affecting the structure and narrative of broadcast television programs, as writers may be coerced by broadcasters into placing cliffhangers and plot developments within the midseason, rather than allow a plot to build up to a traditional season finale leading into a following season premiere.

== See also ==
- Season finale
- Series premiere
- Series finale
