= Limited theatrical release =

Release of a film or media through exclusive locations

Limited theatrical release is a film distribution strategy of releasing a new film in select cinemas across a country, typically art house theaters in major metropolitan markets. Since 1994, a limited theatrical release in the United States and Canada has been defined by Nielsen as a film released in fewer than 600 theaters.

== Background ==
The purpose is often used to gauge the appeal of specialty films, like documentaries, independent films and art films. A common practice by film studios is to give highly anticipated and critically acclaimed films a limited release on or before December 31 in Los Angeles County, California, to qualify for Academy Award nominations (as by its rules). Highly anticipated documentaries also receive limited releases at the same time in New York City, as the rules for the Academy Award for Best Documentary Feature mandate releases in both locations. The films are almost always released to a wider audience in January or February of the following year.

One notable exception is The Rocky Horror Picture Show, which premiered in 1975 and is still shown only in limited fashion; it is the longest-running theatrical release in film history.

In the United States, even a limited theatrical release can help trigger a variety of ancillary revenues, like home video, pay television, streaming, international sales and others.

== Platform release ==
A platform release is a type of limited release in which a film opens in fewer theaters (typically 50 or fewer) than a wide release. If the film receives positive word of mouth, it is gradually expanded to more theaters, as the marketing campaign gains momentum. A successful film released in this manner has even the possibility of expanding into a wide release.

The advantage of the strategy is that marketing costs are conserved until a film's performance has been established, when the distributor may opt to increase advertising and push for a wider release. On the other hand, if audience turnout is not successful, the distributor can withdraw from the campaign, thus minimizing advertising and promotional expenditures.

In the early stages of a platform release, the key metric is the per-theater/screen average gross, not the total box office gross. Arthouse and independent films that garner high per-theater averages are seen as likely candidates for a successful wider release. A distributor using this release strategy must take care not to expand too quickly in the early stages to prevent the (limited) audience from being spread too thin, which would reduce the per-theater average and so cause the film to appear weaker.

=== Awards season ===
Platform releases are commonly used by studios and distributors seeking to position their films for awards success. These films are typically released in the largest markets first, with a gradual rollout depending on audience hype and interest. These releases are usually scheduled towards the end of the year to coincide with major awards events. When a film garners awards attention during this period, critical praise and strong word-of-mouth can translate into a higher per-screen average, and thus expansion to more theaters. Awards attention benefits films from smaller companies or distributors who do not have the larger budgets needed to spend on advertising.

== Criticism ==
With streaming technology making films more accessible to audiences regardless of geographic location, the platform release strategy has been criticized as an outdated model as it limits specialty films to metropolitan areas.

A notable example is the 2017 film Call Me By Your Name, which debuted at the 2017 Sundance Film Festival and began its limited theatrical run on November 24, 2017, in New York City and Los Angeles, with a wider opening on Christmas Day. Only until days before the nominees for the 90th Academy Awards were announced was the film expanded to 800 theaters. Distributor Sony Pictures Classics sparked criticism for not expanding to more cities sooner. Some journalists and industry sources defended the rollout, arguing an immediate wide release for such a film with a specialized audience was not a viable option.

In 2021, some films that were awards contenders (Belfast and Spencer) were opened in wide release. The shift away from platform releases was seen as a result of the COVID-19 pandemic's impact on theaters and the streaming age.

== See also ==
- Film release
- List of American independent films
- Roadshow theatrical release
