= Greenlight =

Decision to produce film or TV project

In the context of the film and television industries, greenlighting is giving permission to proceed with a project. It specifically refers to formally approving its production finance and committing to this financing, thereby allowing the project to proceed from the development phase to pre-production and principal photography. The power to greenlight a project is generally reserved to those in a project or financial management role within an organization. The process of taking a project from pitch to green light formed the basis of a successful reality TV show titled Project Greenlight. The term is a reference to the green traffic signal, indicating "go ahead".

At the Big Five major film studios in the United States and the mini-majors, greenlight power is generally exercised by committees of the studios' high-level executives. However, the studio president, chairman, or chief executive is usually the person who makes the final judgment call. For the largest film budgets involving several hundred million U.S. dollars, the chief executive officer or chief operating officer of the studio's parent media conglomerate may hold final greenlight authority. In practical terms, greenlight power in the 21st century at major film studios means the power to commit the studio to spending about US$100 million, on average, for a feature-length motion picture designated for wide release for the North American market. Historically, this power was exclusively held by white male executives in Hollywood, though the status quo has slowly begun to change since the turn of the 21st century. UCLA reported in 2020 that senior management teams at Hollywood film studios were 93 percent white and 80 percent male.

Studio executives weigh many factors when deciding whether to greenlight films, of which a few include: the film already has a bankable star or director attached; the film has a "built-in audience" because it is related to an existing media franchise; the story resonates with a wide audience, evokes passionate emotions, or causes viewers to lean forward in eager anticipation of whatever happens next; the hero is likable and relatable; the film can be marketed to all four quadrants; and the film can be distributed widely through multiple windows and into multiple international markets.
