= Oscar bait =

Films apparently made solely for Academy Awards

Oscar bait is a term used in the film community for movies that appear to have been produced for the sole purpose of winning or attempting to win Academy Awards, or "Oscars", as they are commonly known. They are usually released just in advance of Oscar season, late in the calendar year, to meet the minimum eligibility requirements for the awards and be fresh in the minds of voters from the Academy of Motion Picture Arts and Sciences. The prestige or acclaim the studio may receive from the nomination or award is often secondary to the increased box office receipts such a film may garner; some films may even be depending on it to turn a profit.

Films seen as Oscar bait often have distinct characteristics. Lavishly produced epic-length period drama and war films, often set against tragic and historical events, are frequently seen this way and often contend for the technical Oscars such as cinematography, makeup and hairstyling, costume design or production design.

The explicit use of the Oscar nominations as a promotional strategy dates to 1978, but the term has been used in discussions of films since at least 1942, and studios have always tended to release at least some films that bait Oscar voters near the end of the year. In December 1978, with the first ever example of a targeted awards strategy of its kind, Michael Cimino's The Deer Hunter was shown only to limited audiences heavy with Oscar voters and critics for just long enough to be eligible, and then went into wide release after the nominations were announced. It ultimately won that year's Best Picture Oscar along with four others. Studios emulated the strategy in later years, and in the early 21st century the term has come into wide use among both filmmakers and viewers.

Films termed "Oscar bait" are not always successful. Many films that appear to be made with the overt intent of gaming the system by pandering to the perceived biases of Academy voters have instead received no nominations at all. Audiences have in turn avoided those films in favor of those that did receive nominations. In a 2014 study of 3,000 films released since 1985, two UCLA professors identified the 1990 film Come See the Paradise as the most deliberately targeted for the Oscars. Despite generally positive reviews, it received no nominations from the Academy and failed at the box office.

== History ==
=== Early years ===
From the first Oscars, there were instances of films whose initial, limited release at the end of a year was meant to qualify it for Academy consideration before a wider release. In 1933, MGM released the Greta Garbo classic Queen Christina in New York City and Los Angeles the week after Christmas, expanding it to more cities once 1934 began. Six years later, it did the same with Gone with the Wind, which went on to win the Best Picture Oscar at the 12th Academy Awards.

"Oscar bait" was used in a critical 1948 review of John Ford's Fort Apache in The New Republic that ends with the sentence "Postcards are supposed to be sent through the mail; flashed self-consciously on the screen, they look like Oscar bait." The New York Times used it in a 1955 article about the then-upcoming The Harder They Fall, Humphrey Bogart's final film. A 1968 ad for The Lion in Winter quoted from a review in Cosmopolitan praising the performances of Peter O'Toole and Katharine Hepburn as "Oscar bait outings."

These all referred to films or performances that, while they might attract the attention of Academy voters, were not explicitly made with them in mind. But also in 1948, the Supreme Court of the United States's decision in United States v. Paramount Pictures, Inc., forbidding the studios from owning theater chains, changed the film industry profoundly. With their pictures no longer guaranteed to have an adequate theatrical run, and television beginning to offer competition, the studios had to rely increasingly on marketing to make films profitable. Thus their release patterns began following the calendar even more closely than they already had.

=== The Deer Hunter ===
The first film to seek Oscar nominations as a deliberate marketing strategy was 1978's The Deer Hunter. After a disastrous test screening of the lengthy Vietnam War epic in Detroit, Universal turned to another producer, Allan Carr, with both Broadway and Hollywood experience, for advice on how to successfully market a depressing film. Carr realized that, with such a grim subject and brutal depictions of war and torture, the only way viewers would seek the film out was if it had been nominated for Academy Awards. Carr, once the producers had hired him as a consultant, arranged for two two-week screenings at a single theater in New York and Los Angeles before the year ended, the minimum requirements for Oscar eligibility at that time. The audiences were limited to critics and Academy members. After that, Universal pulled the film from distribution save for some showings on Z Channel, a boutique cable network that catered to film enthusiasts with showings of rare, arty movies and exclusive director's cuts of more popular ones. "We will cultivate the right audience," Carr promised. "The Deer Hunter is an Oscar winner!"

When the Oscar nominations were announced, The Deer Hunter received nine. It was immediately put into wide release with advertising and publicity materials drawing attention to the nominations. Ultimately it won five, including Best Picture. "It's a common pattern today," said Thom Mount, then president of Universal, years later. "But it was unheard of in 1978. Now everybody does it." Critic Ty Burr agrees: "The practice is the equivalent of a triumphant slam dunk in the final seconds, and it often wins the game," he wrote in a 2013 New York Times Magazine article.

=== 1980s to present ===
During the 1980s, as Hollywood moved away from director-driven films like The Deer Hunter, focusing on repeating the success of summer blockbusters like Jaws and Star Wars (both of which had also been nominated for Best Picture), independent filmmakers refined Carr's methods of exploiting the Oscars. Merchant Ivory, who produced lavish costume dramas, often based on novels by Henry James or E. M. Forster, began to time their releases to align with the awards season. Their 1985 adaptation of Forster's A Room with a View won three of the eight Oscars it was nominated for.

By 1991 the modern film-release calendar, in which studios released the movies they had the highest Oscar hopes for in autumn and December, was set. Independent-film mogul Harvey Weinstein sought prestige for his productions through Oscars; it culminated in a 1998 Best Picture for Shakespeare in Love, another costume drama. Similar strategies to The Deer Hunter brought Weinstein's company another Best Picture in 2010 for The King's Speech, starring Colin Firth, who got his start in Merchant Ivory's 1980s films. Use of the term "Oscar bait" in the media began to increase in the mid-1990s to a 2004 peak, after which it has remained stable.

== Statistical analyses ==
A study by Gabriel Rossman and Oliver Schilke, two sociologists at the University of California, Los Angeles (UCLA), reviewed data from the Internet Movie Database (IMDb), such as genres and plot keywords, for 3,000 movies released between 1985 and 2009 to see what elements were likeliest to draw Oscar nominations. The researchers found that war movies, historical epics, and biographies earned the most. Plot elements of political intrigue, disabilities, war crimes and show business were also very common elements of nominated films. A release during Oscar season, or by an independent division of a major studio were also strong indicators. The study found that some keywords had a strongly negative correlation with Oscar nominations, such as "zombie", "breast implant" and "black independent film".

According to the study, the movie that scored the highest and thus was the most blatant Oscar bait among the films surveyed was Come See the Paradise, directed by Alan Parker and released by 20th Century Fox in 1990. It received that score for the previous Best Director Oscar nominations of Parker (Midnight Express, Mississippi Burning), its setting in Hollywood (the protagonist, played by Dennis Quaid, is a projectionist) and its depiction of a tragic historical event (his Japanese American wife and children are interned) against the background of World War II and racism. It was only released in a few cities during the last week of that year to make it eligible for the awards. However, it was not nominated for any. Second and third were The Lord of the Rings: The Return of the King (2003), which equalled 1959's Ben-Hur and 1997's Titanic by winning eleven trophies at the 76th Academy Awards including Best Picture, and The People vs. Larry Flynt (1996), which earned two nods at the 69th Academy Awards but won neither. At the low end, the movie in that period which least qualified as Oscar bait was the 2006 remake of 1979's When a Stranger Calls, followed by Hotel for Dogs (2009) and Barbershop 2: Back in Business (2004). None of the three least Oscar-bait films was indeed nominated for any Academy Awards.

Rossman and Schilke used their data to develop an algorithm that could predict how many Oscar nominations a film would get, based on its similarities to other recent Oscar nominees. It did not take sophisticated statistical analysis, they noted—Entertainment Weekly had for many years correctly predicted the Oscar nominees. Using data on how much the films had cost to make, they treated the system of nominating as a Tullock lottery to determine the studios' rate of return on their investments. They found that while Oscar-nominated films do indeed get at least a small bonus in ticket sales, directly proportional to the number of nominations, films with what they called "Oscar appeal" took a loss when they did not get any nominations.

"We've found that audiences don't like the kinds of aesthetics that are characteristic of Oscar-worthy movies," Rossman said. "The movies tend to be serious and depressing, and audiences don't like that, so making Oscar-y movies is a riskier strategy than the average moviegoer might appreciate." As for the payoff a movie gets when it receives nominations, "[a]udiences don't like the kind of movies that get Oscars, but they do like the Oscars," he said. The economic bonus from getting nominations or winning compensated for the losses of not doing so.

A year earlier, Ira Kalb, a professor of marketing at the University of Southern California's Marshall School of Business, had done research into how big the Oscar payoff could be for a victorious film. "When used in marketing campaigns, this validation stamp increases the desire of moviegoers to see the films and the talent being honored," he wrote in a Business Insider article. "It also keeps the movies in theaters longer boosting box office receipts. And it substantially increases DVD, streaming, download, and cable TV revenues."

He used the 2010 Best Picture winner, The King's Speech, as his primary example. Before being nominated, it was expected to make about $30 million in worldwide box office receipts. After it received 12 nominations that year, the most of any film in contention, that estimate was revised upward to $200 million. "[A]n Academy Award nomination can boost ticket sales by one-third and cause a jump in the DVD sales of movies no longer in theaters," wrote Kalb. Winning increases the reward even further. As a result of its win, The King's Speech was expected to bring in revenues of almost half a billion dollars. (As of 2014, it has grossed $414 million.)

Some films, Kalb says, can only be profitable if they are nominated for Oscars. For that reason studios plan their Oscar promotional campaigns long before the movie is even released. It has been estimated that The Weinstein Company spent $15 million on its Oscar campaign for The King's Speech, almost as much as was spent on the Oscar campaign of Weinstein-produced 1998 Best Picture Winner Shakespeare in Love.

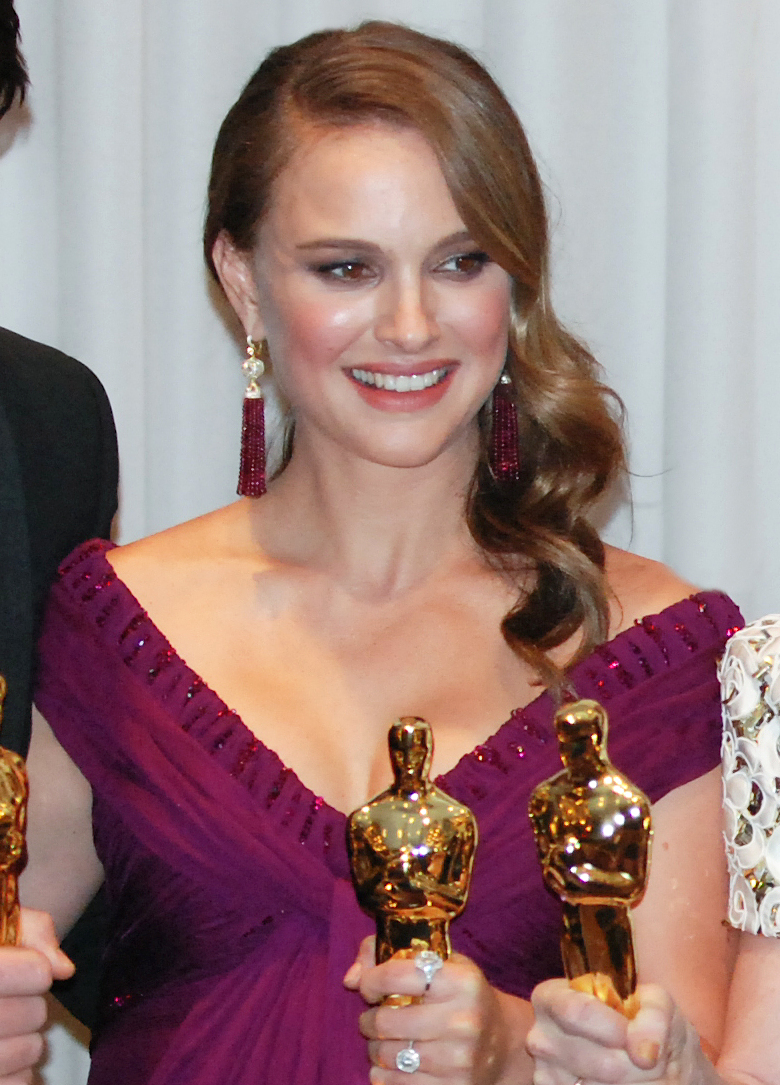
Natalie Portman with her Oscar for Black Swan

Actors, too, benefit at least financially from Oscar wins. Agents and managers estimate that their clients can get as much as 20% more money for their next projects if they win an Oscar or at least received a nomination. Natalie Portman was expected to become one of Hollywood's highest-paid actresses after her 2010 win for Black Swan, and Halle Berry began asking for more than $10 million per film following her 2001 Oscar win for Monster's Ball.

== Criticism ==
In the 21st century, with expensive and sometimes successful campaigns like the Weinsteins' taking a larger role in the Oscar races, the term has become a pejorative among some critics. They suggest that producers and studios are essentially gaming the system, making movies with less attention to quality than to the features that Academy voters have shown a preference for. "At its worst, Oscar bait stinks up the room with its pretense to prestige," writes Sactown Magazine editor S.T. VanAiresdale in Slate. He cites in particular the 2011 film Extremely Loud & Incredibly Close. Its producer, Scott Rudin,

…plotted the whole project the way he'd plotted numerous earlier films, from The Hours to No Country for Old Men to Doubt and others: Acquire an elite property, attach elite principals, and sell the whole package to a studio as an elite fall-movie-season heavyweight. Sometimes the movie that results is great; sometimes it isn't. It hardly matters. Fold an awards campaign into the film's more conventional marketing, and you might be able to cash in on the buzz. The strategy worked—sort of. Through the combination of conspicuous campaigning and hard-ass backroom wheedling for which Rudin is renowned, Extremely Loud got its Best Picture nomination (plus a token Best Supporting Actor nod for Max von Sydow). The producer baited a hook, dropped it in the choppy Sea of Oscar, and came away with the gratification—and the sellable imprimatur—of at least a few Academy nibbles.

That particular nomination, which came after the film had not received any other major film award nomination such as a Golden Globe, was widely criticized. It was especially noted that it received a score of 45% from the online review aggregator Rotten Tomatoes—the worst score received by any Best Picture nominee in the site's history.

Some critics think the term is overused. "If I were Oscar-blogging this year, (Note: He had decided not to do so that year because his husband, playwright Tony Kushner, was expected to be nominated—and was—for Best Adapted Screenplay for Lincoln.) a long rant about the empty foolishness of the phrase 'Oscar bait' would be on the way," tweeted film historian Mark Harris in early December 2012, before some of that year's likely Oscar nominees had even been released. Four years later, he explained his objections in a conversation with fellow Vulture editor Kyle Buchanan. Primarily, he felt that it reduced the filmmakers' motivations to an attempt to win an award, regardless of what they might actually have been. (Note: "I think "Oscar bait" is a way of taking a whole set of aesthetic objections to a movie, which may or may not be legitimate, and turning them into an accusation about what was in the hearts and minds of the people who made the movies … When people start using it to describe content, I think what they’re really objecting to is something else.")

Buchanan agreed that there was "an implication that what appears to be prestigious is, in its own way, as formulaic as a Marvel blockbuster". For his part, he found the phrase to be "a kind of anti-intellectual dog whistle" for some users. Harris further observed that the films by directors such as Martin Scorsese, the Coen brothers and David Fincher released around Oscar season had many elements in common with movies by directors like Tom Hooper and Stephen Daldry often dismissed as Oscar bait, like star-heavy ensemble casts, showcase scenes for the stars and heavy marketing campaigns, yet it was only the "softer and more dismissible" films by the latter directors that were so labeled. "[It's] a way of diminishing movies by feminizing them," he said. "[I]t's used as a sneer in the same way that Masterpiece Theater was used in the 1980s and 'Merchant Ivory' was used in the 1990s."

Buchanan said he used the term only for "mediocre movies that conform to a preexisting Oscar rubric far better than the more interesting films that get passed over", citing Frost/Nixon as an example, which was nominated for Best Picture over snubbed, but better acclaimed films of the same year less easy to categorize, such as The Dark Knight, WALL-E, and The Wrestler. Harris responded by noting that Frost/Nixon had been adapted from a "pretty un-cinematic" stage play and that neither of its stars (Michael Sheen and Frank Langella) had ever been nominated for an Academy Award before, whereas The Wrestler had several aspects often associated with Oscar bait: a sports movie with a character making a last-chance comeback, played by an actor making a comeback who physically transformed himself for the role (Mickey Rourke). "The difference is the presumptive maleness," Harris reiterated. "[It] permanently exempts a director like Darren Aronofsky from charges of making Oscar bait, but consigns Ron Howard to that category for his whole career."

"Critics of the phrase Oscar bait might tell you that making movies is already too difficult to do well without adding the pressure of having an awards-worthy product," concedes VanAiresdale. He nevertheless defended use of the term. "The takeaway from Weinstein and the rest shouldn't be that Oscar bait is a reductive concept that's bad for movies," he wrote. "Rather, bad movies are bad for movies." Since the race for awards did generate some good movies, he felt, moviegoers should not be so dismissive. "Oscar bait is the only reason that grown-ups have anything at all to watch in a movie theater anymore, with four months of awards season compensating for the other eight months of craven superhero franchises, anemic romantic comedies, and whatever Adam Sandler wipes off his shoe."

The fact that the concept existed and had a name showed how important film still was to American culture, VanAirsdale said.

For all the media hand-wringing about television usurping film's grip on our culture's imagination, no one complains about Breaking Bad losing an Emmy to Homeland the way they still yelp on and on about Crash thwarting Brokeback Mountain for a Best Picture Oscar … Movie lovers want to believe that the academy shares our tastes. We want to believe that Oscar history reflects an objective sense of aesthetic justice rather than ritual orgies of self-congratulation. We want to believe every autumn that our cinemas are more than just clearinghouses for expressions of ego and grandiosity. Mostly we want to believe that a phrase like Oscar bait is somehow beneath a film culture so obsessed with anointing the best and greatest and top 10 of everything and handing out Academy Awards in the first place. We can't have it both ways, and anyway, why would we want to? As the oldest surviving tradition connecting Hollywood to its audience, Oscar bait is all the movies have left to insulate them from the dull, encroaching disposability of the culture around us. The only empty foolishness I can see is to not enjoy it—to not cherish it—while we still can.

Other critics have complained about the effect on the yearly release calendar, by which grouping most prospective Oscar winners in the last months of the year, usually in limited release, along with holiday season tentpole movies results in January and February becoming the winter dump months, when new releases are generally low in quality and/or limited in their appeal. A similar period, from mid-August through September, also precedes the end of the year.

"This clustering of quality films in the post–Toronto Film Festival weeks of fall and winter frustrates critics, publicists, movie exhibitors, studios, and award voters," Adam Sternbergh wrote in a 2015 Vulture post. "[B]ut, most crucially, it alienates the movie audience." At the time that year's nominations were announced, he observed, it was expected that either Boyhood or Selma would win, yet the latter film had not yet gone into wide release, and another top contender, American Sniper, only went into wide release the day after nominations were announced. "Of all the side effects of this silly awards-show pileup, this one seems like the silliest: People are expected to care about the awards prospects of films they won't get to see until long after the awards are awarded."

While acknowledging the dump months are a result of other factors besides the Oscars and beyond the studios' control, such as the weather, the economy and competition from other entertainment such as (especially) football season, Paul Shirey at JoBlo.com nevertheless calls on Hollywood to spread out its Oscar-quality releases throughout the year:

What is to stop Hollywood from releasing some of their better fare during these "off" months? Rather than saving them to win statues, why not put them out to reap some box office and fill an otherwise dead month with something worth seeing? And the argument that "Academy voters" may forget about films released early on is bogus, as the majority of them get screeners. And even with that in their court, many have confessed to never seeing most of the films up for an award. How bogus is that? … Hollywood needs to slow its roll and give us an even spread of choices. There's no predicting the box office; absolutely no science to back it up. So, take some risks. There's no reason we can't swap an Argo for The Last Stand in January or any number of combinations out there. Give the audience a chance to see the goods year-round, rather than cramming for them all at once like homework.

Sternbergh suggests this could be facilitated by emulating the playoff formats of professional sports leagues, which divide their teams into conferences to ensure wide interest in postseason elimination contests. The Academy, he proposes, should return to five nominations for Best Picture and picking one nominee from each three-month quarter of the year, with the best second-place finisher getting the remaining wild card berth.

== In popular culture ==
The 2006 Christopher Guest film For Your Consideration satirizes the concept of Oscar bait.

The concept was parodied in the 2008 American Dad! episode "Tearjerker", in which the supervillain Tearjerker (Roger) produces a film called Oscar Gold, about a mentally challenged alcoholic Jewish boy whose puppy dies of cancer while he's hiding in an attic during the Holocaust. It is intended to be so tragic that anyone who watches it cries themselves to death.

In the British comedy series Extras, actress Kate Winslet plays a caricature of herself desperate for an Oscar. During the episode, Winslet tells the character Andy Millman (portrayed by Ricky Gervais) that she took the role in the unnamed Holocaust film, claiming that films such as Schindler's List and The Pianist have "Oscars coming out of the arse". Later in the episode, Winslet also muses that "playing a mental" also guarantees an Oscar win. Winslet would later win her first Academy Award, Best Actress, for her role as an illiterate former Nazi in The Reader (2008).

In the film Tropic Thunder (2008), characters Tugg Speedman (Ben Stiller) and Kirk Lazarus (Robert Downey Jr.) discuss the concept regarding Speedman's former role in the fictional film Simple Jack, in which Lazarus notes that "you never go full retard", contrasting the Oscar successes of Dustin Hoffman (Rain Man, 1988) and Tom Hanks (Forrest Gump, 1994) with Sean Penn's failure to win an award for his role in I Am Sam (2001). Tropic Thunder received protests from disability rights organisations due to its constant use of the word "retard"; Stiller defended the scene as being intended to lampoon actors who use such subjects as a way to win awards.

During the week before the 2017 Academy Awards telecast, NBC talk show host Seth Meyers ran a parody trailer for Oscar Bait, "a film that is shamelessly timed for awards season", on his show. It featured clips of Meyers and others involved with his show as actors crying frequently, with scenes featuring racial tension and latent homosexuality along with "pretentiously artistic shots of a man's hand grazing wheat". Intertitles quoted purported reviews from real publications, such as "If you like films where a character is forced to overcome a rare disease, then this, my friends, is your film" and comparing the parody film favorably with The King's Speech.

== In other media awards ==
The "bait" phrasing has been used in the context of the other major American popular-media awards. Cheek to Cheek, the album of jazz standards Lady Gaga began recording in 2013 with Tony Bennett, has been referred to as "Grammy bait". Later, in 2013, The Daily Beast came out with an article that bemoaned the Primetime Emmy Awards' apparent antipathy to the performances of child actors in television shows that otherwise received many nominations and noted that they

…have played characters overcoming bullying, substance abuse, coming to terms with their sexuality, suffocating parents, absent parents, dying parents, sexual awakenings, and PTSD. The material screams Emmy bait. But none will have a shot at being rewarded Sunday night—and they may never get nominations they deserve, no matter how good they are.

Those usages suggest work whose aspirations would be likely to be rewarded by awards voters, rather than marketing that depends on award nominations to turn a profit. However, on Broadway, where theatrical productions vie for Tony Awards, while the term "Tony bait" has not been seen, many believe those awards have come to determine how plays and musicals are marketed. Their complaints are similar to those of film enthusiasts.

"The Tony deadline is now the central organizing event that drives Broadway, for better and for worse," producer Thomas Viertel told The New York Times in 2012. While that date, set by the awards committee, varies every year, it is usually in late April. Nearly half of a new season's productions open in March or April. "Many theater producers and their star actors prefer to open in spring in hopes of having the highest profile possible for Tony voters," the Times wrote. "[They] open at the last possible moment so their shows (and, hopefully, the rave reviews) are fresh in the minds of Tony nominators and voters."

Tony nominations are announced a few days after the deadline for eligibility, with the awards themselves given out in a nationally televised ceremony in June. "The weeks after that Tony ceremony are often a bloodbath on Broadway, when several productions typically fold in the absence of an awards-generated boost at the box office. "If the Tonys don't happen for us," said Stephen Byrd, another producer, "it will hurt the word-of-mouth buzz about the show, and you have a hard time keeping a new show running without that sort of buzz." While the influx of tourists into the city during the ensuing summer months might seem to ease such concerns since it means larger audiences, those tourists are more likely to see an established long runner with which they are familiar, usually from a previous visit, than a new show that did not capture the Tony for Best Musical or Best Play. "Look, tourists don't come and say, 'I've never heard of that show, but I'll go see it,'" says Nancy Nagel Gibbs, a producer of Peter and the Starcatcher, a 2012 Tony nominee for the latter award.

Many of the Tony winners in recent years have indeed been those productions that opened closer to the deadline. Across the Atlantic, on London's West End, the awards-driven clustering of openings is less of a problem because the two major awards for those productions, the Olivier Awards and the Evening Standard Theatre Awards, are given out six months apart. The Broadway League, one of the two organizations that sponsors the Tonys, has considered moving the eligibility date back to the end of the calendar year to encourage more openings in the summer. But that is considered unlikely because the awards telecast does not typically do well enough in the ratings to be likely to be shown during February, a sweeps month on American television.

Video gaming awards are less prone to the phenomenon; industry awards such as The Game Awards (which, in contrast to most traditional media awards run by nonprofit guilds and academies, is run as a for-profit enterprise) tend to reward games that are already the most commercially successful without regard to prestige.

Apple Computer used similar baiting techniques to promote "1984," an iconic Super Bowl commercial. To ensure the advertisement qualified for advertising awards issued in early 1984, the company purposely aired the ad December 31, 1983 on KMVT, a station serving a small market in Idaho's Sun Valley, an area where advertising executives had second homes, ahead of the ad's national debut.

== See also ==
- Hallmark holiday, one perceived as created primarily to spur sales at retail establishments
- Very special episode, a thematically similar phenomenon in television
- Message picture
- Virtue signalling
- Shooting and crying
- Social thriller
- Prestige picture
