= Oscar season =

Time leading up to the Academy Awards

The Oscar season is the time period in which Hollywood studios release or promote the films they consider most likely to be critically acclaimed, hoping to win at the Academy Awards.

== Criteria ==
Oscar season usually begins in the fall following the usual slate of summer blockbuster movies. While October lends itself to horror releases, the first batch of prospective Oscar films tend to come out that month, followed by a steadier release in November and December.

== Origins ==
The Academy Awards occur every late February and films that win awards typically see a boost in sales. To take advantage of this, the studios release films they deem "Oscar worthy" in the fall, before the eligibility cut-off, so that the films remain fresh in the memories of critics and Academy members right before the Awards, increasing their chances of being nominated.

== Campaigning ==
During Oscar season, studios heavily campaign for their films to win, spending large amounts of money in an attempt to influence Academy voters. Harvey Weinstein, of Miramax, was especially notorious for his campaigning. Weinstein was alleged to have spread rumors that John Nash was antisemitic, to hurt the chances of A Beautiful Mind, which was competing for the awards with the Miramax film In the Bedroom. It was also suspected, although unproven, that Weinstein was involved with the nomination of The Reader in 2009, a film that received mixed reviews from critics.

The Oscars provide opportunities for independent film distributors with their moderate and low-budget films to compete with films released by the major studios. Awards campaigns may involve placed advertising labeled “for your consideration”, with appearances by cast and crew at industry events, private receptions, press coverage, theatrical and online screenings, and direct communication to voters. The Academy of Motion Picture Arts & Sciences establishes rules that govern such campaigns, including restrictions on direct lobbying and promotional events involving Academy members.

The studio head is usually personally responsible in campaigning for the studio's films. This comes in the form of hosting celebrity-filled private parties for "friends" before the Awards. The CEO of Universal Studios, Ronald Meyer, for example, attempted to influence Academy members—such as Ron Howard, Brian Grazer, and Frank Langella—by hosting a cocktail party at Nobu West.

== See also ==
- Dump months
- Oscar bait
- Film awards seasons
- 2016–17 film awards season
- 2017–18 film awards season
- Indiewood
- Prestige picture
