= Apocalypto (soundtrack) =

Apocalypto: Original Score

Film score by James Horner
- Released: December 5, 2006
- Recorded: Fall 2006
- Genre: Film score
- Length: 60:33
- Label: Hollywood
- Producers: Simon Rhodes, James Horner

James Horner chronology
All the King's Men (2006)	Apocalypto: Original Score (2006)	The Life Before Her Eyes (2007)

Professional ratings
Review scores
Source	Rating
AllMusic	3.5/5 stars
Empire	2/5 stars
Filmtracks	2/5 stars
The MovieMusic Store	4/5 stars
Movie Music UK	3/5 stars
Movie Score Reviews	2/5 stars
Movie Wave	3/5 stars
ScoreNotes	4.5/10 stars
SoundtrackNet	3/5 stars

Apocalypto: Original Score is the soundtrack to the 2006 film of the same name by Mel Gibson. It was released on the Hollywood Records label.

== Production ==
The music is composed by James Horner and features vocals by Pakistani singer Rahat Nusrat Fateh Ali Khan and English musician Terry Edwards. The Apocalypto soundtrack is Horner's third time collaborating with Gibson. Horner had previously composed the score for Gibson's 1993 The Man Without a Face and his 1995 epic film Braveheart.

Straying away from his repertoire of orchestral music, Horner's mainly improvised Apocalypto soundtrack makes use of a large array of exotic instruments, such as the Tromba Marina, Swedish bark trumpets and the usage of Ugandan wildebeest horns in addition to synth pads. The soundtrack was recorded at London's Abbey Road Studios over the course of several weeks during the fall of 2006.

Woodwind specialist Tony Hinnigan also contributed to the film score, borrowing numerous instruments from the New Globe Theatre and assembling the music crew.

Gibson described Khan's vocal contribution to the score:

"He's a valuable asset to our soundtrack. His dulcet tones add emotion and drama, and we have a very narrow palette as far as orchestra. We don't have an orchestra so he is fulfilling a lot of the functions that would usually be supplied by the use of a full orchestra. Just all in one man; he's a one-man band."

== Reception ==
James Southall of Movie Wave praised James Horner's score, describing it as one of the composer's most visceral and creative works. He highlighted its emphasis on atmosphere over melody, its use of percussion, ethnic wind instruments, synthesizers and vocals to create an immersive soundscape, and commended its emotional intensity despite the absence of traditional orchestral themes. Southall concluded that the score was among Horner's boldest later-career works and awarded it four out of five stars.

In a review for ScoreReviews, Andreas Lindahl praised James Horner's score for Apocalypto as a bold departure from the composer's more conventional style, highlighting its heavy use of ethnic percussion, vocals and atmospheric textures to create an immersive soundscape. He commended the score's effectiveness in supporting the film's relentless tension and primal setting, while noting that its emphasis on rhythm and ambience over melody made it a challenging standalone listening experience for some audiences. Lindahl observed similarities between Apocalypto and Horner's score for The New World, including sampled bird calls and a recurring descending string motif. He also criticised the use of sampled strings and brass in place of live orchestral instruments, speculating that the choice was likely motivated by budgetary constraints.

Jonathan Broxton of Movie Music UK described James Horner's score as a largely texture- and rhythm-driven work that prioritises authenticity over traditional themes and melodies. He praised Horner's use of unusual instruments, percussion and the vocal performances of Rahat Nusrat Fateh Ali Khan and Terry Edwards for enhancing the film's atmosphere and sense of danger, calling the score highly effective within the film. However, he considered it a difficult standalone listening experience because of its relentless darkness and lack of melodic content, concluding that it would primarily appeal to Horner enthusiasts and admirers of unconventional film music. Broxton praised Edwards' and Khan's use of growling, throat singing, chanting and wailing, describing the vocal performances as eerie, intimidating and taunting, and noted that they intensified the score's atmosphere. He also stated that much of the action music resembles Horner's score for Braveheart, with woodwinds, percussion and synthesizer drones creating a pervasive atmosphere of tension and dread. He awarded the score three out of five stars.

Christian Clemmensen of Filmtracks described the score as a primal, atmospheric work that relied on ethnic woodwinds, percussion, synthesizers, and the vocals of Rahat Fateh Ali Khan and Terry Edwards rather than a symphony orchestra. He praised its effectiveness in creating a harrowing and authentic soundscape, but criticised its sparse thematic development, reliance on ambient textures and electronic samples, and limited appeal as a standalone listening experience. Clemmensen concluded that the score was more effective within the film than on album, awarding it two out of five stars.

== Track listing ==
All music is composed by James Horner.

No.	Title	Length
1.	"From the Forest..."	1:55
2.	"Tapir Hunt"	1:31
3.	"The Storyteller's Dreams"	3:41
4.	"Holcane Attack"	9:28
5.	"Captives"	3:06
6.	"Entering the City with a Future Foretold"	6:05
7.	"Sacrificial Procession"	3:40
8.	"Words Through the Sky - The Eclipse"	5:11
9.	"The Games and Escape"	5:15
10.	"An Elusive Quarry"	2:15
11.	"Frog Darts"	2:45
12.	"No Longer the Hunted"	5:50
13.	"Civilisations Brought by Sea"	2:20
14.	"To the Forest..."	7:31
Total length:		60:33
