= Event film =

Heavily promoted and anticipated movie

An event film or event movie is a blockbuster film whose release itself is considered a major event.

== Criteria ==
It could be a highly anticipated sequel or a big budget film with state-of-the-art special effects or major stars generating considerable attention. Although it is subjective what is and what isn't considered an event movie, they are usually among the highest-grossing movies in their years of release and become a part of popular culture.

== Examples ==
Steven Spielberg's Jaws from 1975 is the first film that was considered an event movie at the time of its release, but some sources also retroactively apply the term to earlier films such as The Birth of a Nation (1915), Gone with the Wind (1939), and Ben-Hur (1959).

Examples more recent than Jaws include Spielberg's Jurassic Park (1993), James Cameron's Titanic (1997), Spider-Man (2002) and Avatar (2009) alongside the Star Wars (1977–present), Harry Potter (2001–2011), and Lord of the Rings (2001–2003) films and The Dark Knight (2008).

In the 2010s, other event movies include The Hunger Games (2012), Frozen (2013), Deadpool (2016), and many films from the Marvel Cinematic Universe, in particular Avengers: Infinity War (2018) and Avengers: Endgame (2019), Spider-Man: No Way Home (2021).

Other event films include Avatar: The Way of Water (2022) and the Barbenheimer phenomenon (2023).

== See also ==
- Event television
- Four-quadrant movie
- List of highest-grossing films
- Media franchise
- National Film Registry
- Tent-pole (entertainment)
