= DreamWorks =

DreamWorks may refer to:

- DreamWorks Pictures, an American film production company of Amblin
  - DreamWorks Television, an American television production company and division of the film studio
  - DreamWorks Records, an American record label and former division of the film studio later acquired by Universal Music Group
- DreamWorks Animation, an American animation studio and former division of the film studio that is now a subsidiary of NBCUniversal
  - DreamWorks Animation Television, an American television animation studio, production company, and the arm and label of DreamWorks Animation
  - DreamWorks Classics, a subsidiary of the animation studio and formerly known as Classic Media
- DreamWorks Experience, a themed land at the Dreamworld theme park in Australia
- DreamWorks Interactive, a video game production arm later acquired by Electronic Arts

== See also ==
- Dreamwork, a method of dream analysis
- Dreamwork (song), a song by AKA
