= Tentpole =

Money maker for a media network company

In television and motion pictures, a tentpole or tent-pole is a program or film that supports the financial performance of a film studio, television network, or cinema chain. It is an analogy for the way a strong central pole provides a stable structure to a tent. A tent-pole film may be expected to support the sale of tie-in merchandise.

== Types ==
In the film industry, tent-poles are sometimes widely released initial offerings in a string of releases and are expected by studios to turn a profit in a short period of time. Such programming is often accompanied by larger budgets and heavy promotion. A tentpole movie, for example, is a film that is expected to support a wide range of ancillary tie-in products such as toys and games.

== Examples ==
An example of this strategy in television is to schedule a popular television program alongside new or unknown programming, in an attempt to keep audience viewers watching after the flagship program is over; a prominent example is the long-running Star Trek series. Roseanne Barr and her then-husband Tom Arnold used the success of Barr's hit sitcom Roseanne to promote Arnold's sitcom The Jackie Thomas Show, going so far as to remove the commercial break between shows to dissuade viewers from changing the channel (a hot switch). The tactic was successful, but complaints from local affiliates and public feuding between the Arnolds and ABC led to the latter show's end, by mutual decision, after one season. A related concept is the hammock: if a network has two tent-pole series, it can boost the performance of a weak or emerging show by inserting it in the schedule between the two tent-poles.

== See also ==
- Aftershow
- Audience flow
- Blockbuster (entertainment)
- Event movie
- Four-quadrant movie
- List of highest-grossing films
