= Blockbuster (entertainment) =

Term for a popular film

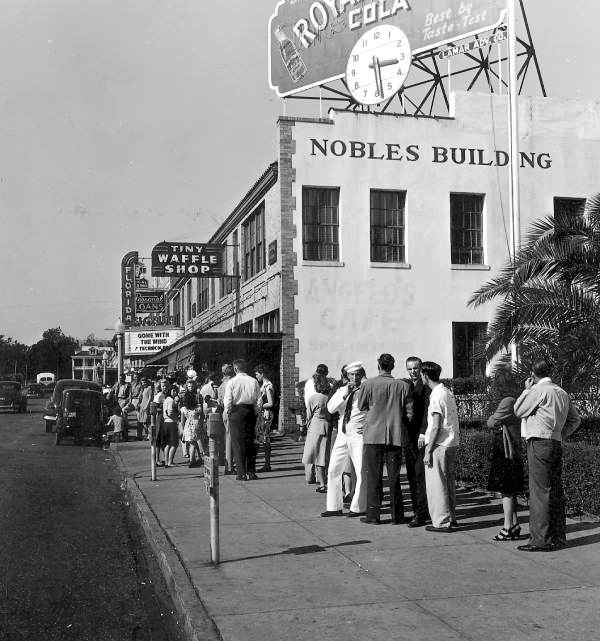
Queue for Gone with the Wind in Pensacola, Florida (1947)

A blockbuster is a work of entertainment—typically used to describe a feature film produced by a major film studio, but also other media—that is highly popular and financially successful. The term has also come to refer to any large-budget production intended for "blockbuster" status, aimed at mass markets with associated merchandising, sometimes on a scale that meant the financial fortunes of a film studio or a distributor could depend on it.

== Etymology ==
The term began to appear in the American press in the early 1940s, referring to the blockbuster bombs, aerial munitions capable of destroying a whole block of buildings. Its first known use in reference to films was in May 1943, when advertisements in Variety and Motion Picture Herald described the RKO film, Bombardier, as "The block-buster of all action-thrill-service shows!" Another trade advertisement in 1944 boasted that the war documentary, With the Marines at Tarawa, "hits the heart like a two ton blockbuster."

Several theories have been put forward for the origin of the term in a film context. One explanation pertains to the practice of "block booking" whereby a studio would sell a package of films to theaters, rather than permitting them to select which films they wanted to exhibit. However, this practice was outlawed in 1948 before the term became common parlance; while pre-1948 high-grossing big-budget spectacles may be retroactively labelled "blockbusters," this is not how they were known at the time. Another explanation is that trade publications would often advertise the popularity of a film by including illustrations showing long queues often extending around the block, but in reality the term was never used in this way. The term was actually coined by publicists who drew on readers' familiarity with the blockbuster bombs, drawing an analogy with the bomb's huge impact. The trade press subsequently appropriated the term as short-hand for a film's commercial potential. Throughout 1943 and 1944 the term was applied to films such as Bataan, No Time for Love and Brazil.

== History ==
=== Golden Age era ===
The term fell out of usage in the aftermath of World War II but was revived in 1948 by Variety in an article about big budget films. By the early 1950s the term had become standardised within the film industry and the trade press to denote a film that was large in spectacle, scale and cost, that would go on to achieve a high gross. In December 1950 the Daily Mirror predicted that Samson and Delilah would be "a box office block buster", and in November 1951 Variety described Quo Vadis as "a b.o. blockbuster [...] right up there with Birth of a Nation and Gone With the Wind for boxoffice performance [...] a super-spectacle in all its meaning".

According to Stephen Prince, Akira Kurosawa's 1954 film Seven Samurai had a "racing, powerful narrative engine, breathtaking pacing, and sense-assaulting visual style" (what he calls a "kinesthetic cinema" approach to "action filmmaking and exciting visual design") that was "the clearest precursor" and became "the model for" the "visceral" Hollywood blockbuster "brand of moviemaking" that emerged in the 1970s. According to Prince, Kurosawa became "a mentor figure" to a generation of emerging American filmmakers who went on to develop the Hollywood blockbuster format in the 1970s, such as Steven Spielberg, George Lucas, Martin Scorsese and Francis Ford Coppola.

=== Blockbuster era ===
==== 1970s ====
In 1975, the usage of "blockbuster" for films coalesced around Steven Spielberg's Jaws. It was perceived as a new cultural phenomenon: fast-paced, exciting entertainment, inspiring interest and conversation beyond the theatre (which would later be called "buzz"), and repeated viewings. The film is regarded as the first film of the "blockbuster era", and founded the blockbuster film genre. Two years later, Star Wars expanded on the success of Jaws, setting box office records and enjoying a theatrical run that lasted more than a year. After the success of Jaws and Star Wars, many Hollywood producers attempted to create similar "event" films with wide commercial appeal, and film companies began green-lighting increasingly large-budget films, and relying extensively on massive advertising blitzes leading up to their theatrical release. These two films were the prototypes for the "summer blockbuster" trend, in which major film studios and distributors planned their annual marketing strategy around a big release by July 4. George Lucas's 1973 hit American Graffiti is often cited for helping give birth to the summer blockbuster.

Blockbuster cinema of this decade also included The Exorcist (1973), One Flew Over the Cuckoo's Nest (1975), Rocky (1976), Close Encounters of the Third Kind (1977), Grease, Hooper, Convoy, Superman (each from 1978), 10, Kramer vs. Kramer and Star Trek: The Motion Picture (each from 1979).

==== 1980s–1990s ====
The next fifteen years saw a number of high-quality blockbusters released including the likes of Alien (1979) and its sequel, Aliens (1986), 9 to 5 (1980), the first three Indiana Jones films (1981, 1984 and 1989), E.T. the Extra-Terrestrial, Tootsie (each from 1982), Ghostbusters, Beverly Hills Cop (each from 1984), the Back to the Future trilogy (1985, 1989 and 1990), Top Gun (1986), Die Hard, Who Framed Roger Rabbit (both from 1988), Batman (1989) and its sequel Batman Returns (1992), The Little Mermaid (1989), Ghost, Home Alone, The Hunt for Red October (each from 1990), Terminator 2: Judgment Day, Beauty and the Beast (each from 1991), Aladdin (1992), Jurassic Park (1993), Forrest Gump, Speed, The Lion King (each from 1994), Toy Story (1995), Independence Day (1996), Men in Black, Titanic (each from 1997) and The Matrix (1999).

==== 21st century ====
While Hollywood has long been aware of the value of sequels to successful movies, and of series based on popular characters such as James Bond, the twenty-first century saw studios invest increasingly in franchises. The eight-part Harry Potter film series, starting with Harry Potter and the Philosopher's Stone (2001), and The Lord of the Rings trilogy (2001–2003), as well as the superhero trilogies X-Men (2000–2006) and Spider-Man (2002–2007) were further demonstrations of the power of the comic book movie. In 2008 Iron Man became the first movie in the Marvel Cinematic Universe (or MCU) while a decade later, Black Panther (2018) was the first Marvel entry to be nominated for the prestigious Academy Award for Best Picture. As of June 2025, there are 43 movies in the MCU, with a combined global box office of $31 billion, and the franchise inspired other cinematic universes including the DC Extended Universe, the MonsterVerse and the Wizarding World, with mixed box office results. Other successful franchises of the era included Fast & Furious (starting 2001), Shrek (which also started in 2001), Ice Age (starting 2002), Pirates of the Caribbean (starting 2003), The Dark Knight trilogy (2005–2012) and Transformers (starting 2007).

Another notable trend was the rise of two-part blockbusters, particularly in book adaptations and to end movie series. This trend started with Harry Potter and the Deathly Hallows – Part 1 (2010) and Part 2 (2011), and was followed by The Twilight Saga: Breaking Dawn – Part 1 (2011) and Part 2 (2012), The Hunger Games: Mockingjay – Part 1 (2014) and Part 2 (2015), It Chapter One (2017) and Chapter Two (2019), Avengers: Infinity War (2018) and Endgame (2019), and Dune: Part One (2021) and Part Two (2024).

Notable animated blockbusters from the 2000s to the 2010s include many entries from Disney, Pixar, Dreamworks and Illumination alongside their sequels: Finding Nemo (2003), The Incredibles (2004), Up (2009), Despicable Me (2010), Frozen (2013), Moana and Zootopia (each from 2016) and Inside Out (2015).

The rise of streaming media and the impact of the COVID-19 pandemic on cinema significantly changed the film landscape in the 2020s, with analysts disagreeing about whether decreased cinema attendance would make Hollywood more reliant on blockbusters or would instead favor smaller films. Expected blockbusters such as Onward, Tenet (each from 2020) and No Time to Die (postponed to 2021) had cinema releases that were curtailed, postponed, or replaced entirely with direct-to-streaming releases. Major releases were increasingly booked with shorter runs, rather than follow established tentpole windows.

A scatterplot depicting the correlation between movie production budget and worldwide gross in millions of USD.

The following decade, Hollywood saw blockbusters such as Spider-Man: Across the Spider-Verse (2023), Oppenheimer (2023), Sinners (2025), Minions: The Rise of Gru (2022), Spider-Man: No Way Home (2021), Avatar: The Way of Water (2022), The Super Mario Bros. Movie (2023), Inside Out 2 (2024), Zootopia 2 (2025), The Super Mario Galaxy Movie (2026), The Odyssey (2026) and Greta Gerwig's adaptation of Barbie (2023) alongside several older franchises that were successfully resurrected like Top Gun: Maverick (2022), and Beetlejuice Beetlejuice (2024).

== Criticism ==
Eventually, the focus on creating blockbusters grew so intense that a backlash occurred, with some critics and film-makers decrying the prevalence of a "blockbuster mentality", lamenting the death of the author-driven, "more artistic" small-scale films of the New Hollywood era. This view is taken, for example, by film journalist Peter Biskind, who wrote that all studios wanted was another Jaws, and as production costs rose, they were less willing to take risks, and therefore based blockbusters on the "lowest common denominators" of the mass market. In his 2006 book The Long Tail, Chris Anderson talks about blockbuster films, stating that a society that is hit-driven, and makes way and room for only those films that are expected to be a hit, is in fact a limited society. In 1998, writer David Foster Wallace posited that films are subject to an inverse cost and quality law.

Biskind's book Easy Riders, Raging Bulls argues that the New Hollywood movement marked a significant shift towards independently produced and innovative works by a new wave of directors, but that this shift began to reverse itself when the commercial success of Jaws and Star Wars led to the realization by studios of the importance of blockbusters, advertising and control over production (even though the success of Francis Ford Coppola's 1972 epic The Godfather was said to be the precursor to the blockbuster phenomenon).

Video essayist Patrick H. Willems criticizes original big budget blockbuster attempts by streamers Netflix, Apple and Amazon (e.g. Ocean's Eleven-inspired action comedies like Lyft and Fountain of Youth; world–building franchises like The Electric State and Bright) as "lifeless" to the point of calling them "fake movies", "vapor" and "slop".

Pop culture writer Nathan Rabin wrote a series of articles at The Dissolve titled Forgotbusters re-examining the top 25 grossing films that audiences went to see during their original theatrical release yet have failed to endure afterwards (e.g. the 1996 Michael Jordan/Looney Tunes hybrid Space Jam).

Filmmaker James N. Kienitz Wilkins's 2023 still image film Still Film argues about the nightmarish effects of nostalgic cinephilia using 35mm presskit photos for blockbusters from the 1980s-90s such as Lethal Weapon (1987) and Apollo 13 (1995).

== See also ==
- Art house film
- Box office
- Box-office bomb
- Classical Hollywood cinema
- Four-quadrant movie
- List of cult films
- List of highest-grossing openings for films
- List of highest-grossing films
- Megamusical
- Oscar season
- Sleeper hit
- Barbenheimer
