= Four-quadrant movie =

Movie appealing to various demographics

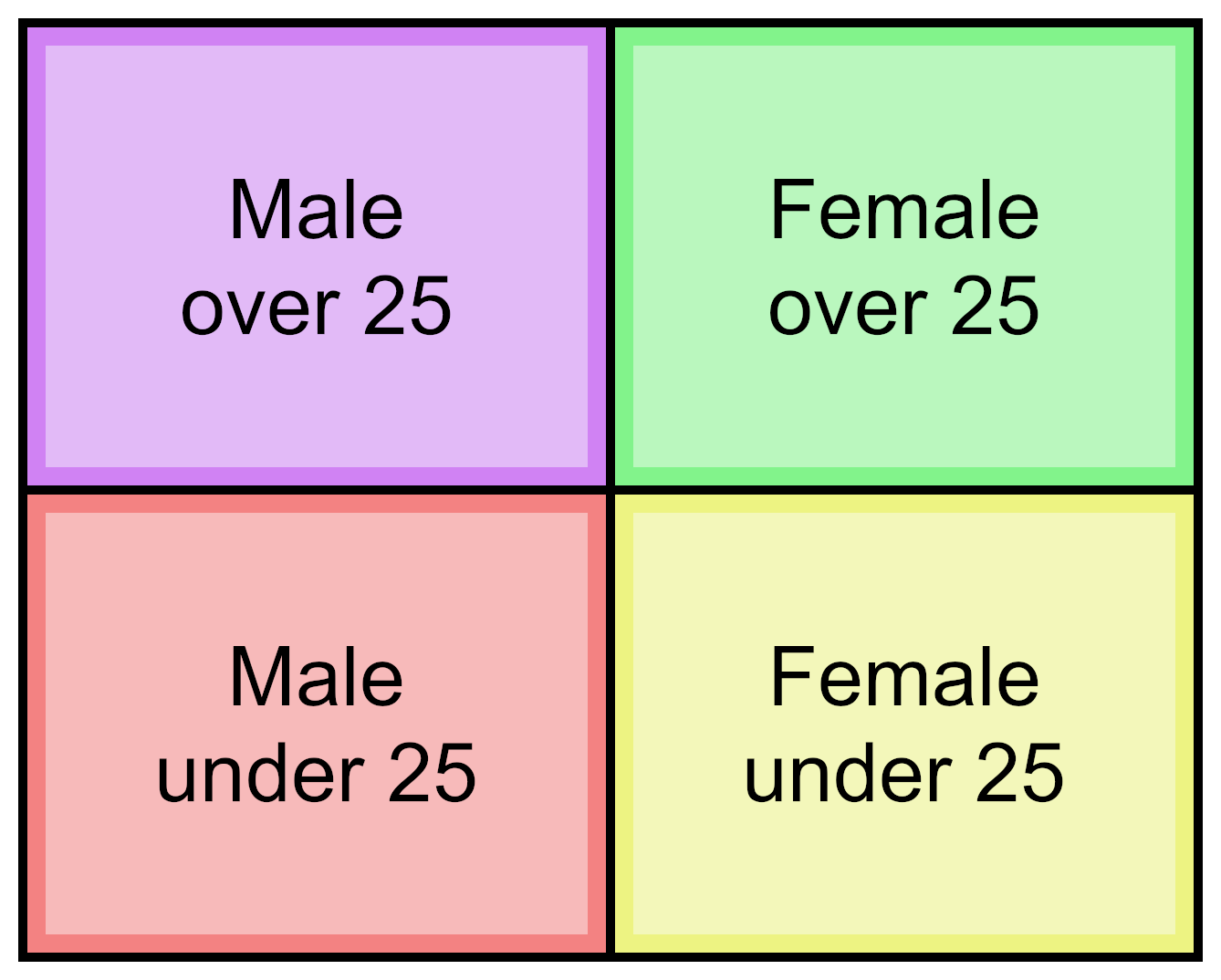
The four groups that a four-quadrant movie is said to appeal to.

In the Hollywood movie industry, a four-quadrant movie is one that appeals to all four major demographic "quadrants" of the movie-going audience: both male and female, and both over and under 25 years of age.

== Criteria ==
Films are generally aimed at at least two such quadrants, and most tent-pole films are four-quadrant movies. A film's budget is often correlated to the number of quadrants the film is expected to reach, and movies are rarely produced if not focused on at least two quadrants.

== Examples ==
Although four-quadrant movies are generally family-friendly, this is not a requirement. Titanic, which was the highest-grossing film ever following its theatrical run, has been cited as a strong example of a four-quadrant movie that blended action and romance in a historical setting to appeal to all four quadrants. Some other films exhibiting this quality may be comedic (such as Meet the Parents) or horror films, or be crowd-pleasing in nature, such as high-profile action films or adaptations of popular novels. Four-quadrant movies often have both adult and child protagonists. They are often built on a "high-concept" premise with well-delineated heroes and villains, with emotion, action and danger present in the story.

== See also ==
- Blockbuster (entertainment)
- Event film
- Family film
- List of highest-grossing films
- Tent-pole film
