= Prestige picture =

Type of magazine

A prestige picture is a film produced to bolster the perceived artistic integrity, rather than to turn a large profit; the studio may even expect the film to lose money.

== History ==
Prestige pictures are largely the province of major Hollywood film studios — such as Metro-Goldwyn-Mayer and Warner Bros. — that produce numerous films every year.

In the 1930s, such studios might release one prestige picture per year. The films' screenwriters drew material from historical events, well-known literary classics, or popular novels or plays.

== See also ==
- Art film
- Cinema of the United Kingdom
- Cinema of the United States
- Film criticism
- Quality television
- New Hollywood
- Indiewood
- Oscar bait
