= Event television =

Television marketing strategy

Event television (sometimes used in verb form as the buzzword "eventize") is a television network marketing concept which arose in the early 2010s and is characterized by a shift in priorities towards enticing audiences to watch programming immediately as it is broadcast. This is largely in response to the tendency of modern audiences to time shift programming (DVR) or view using on-demand streaming services, which has produced a steady decline in live viewership ratings.

== Criteria ==
Live episodes have long been a staple of television programming, but the shift towards event television has greatly accelerated development of new styles of "DVR-proof" programming and new methods of marketing in response to the growth of these new technologies. Networks are focusing on more live entertainment and investing into more sports programming, which are less attractive to DVR users, but excite and engage live viewers. Scripted programs have adopted the strategy as well, by making more frequent use of sudden, unannounced plot twists or major character deaths. "It's important to keep your fans engaged", CBS entertainment president Nina Tassler said. "You keep eventizing your entire season." Event television often makes use of interactive ways to encourage live viewer participation, such as voting for contestants and results shows, interactive media such as mobile apps, viral marketing, or hashtags.

Prior to the 2010s, the phrase "event television" was used to describe live broadcasts covering certain events in real time, such as pageants, sports, breaking news, or awards presentations. Starting in the 1960s, it was also used to describe certain "must watch" programs created for television which significantly altered viewer habits for a short time, drawing them to a particular channel for a night or even "emptying the streets and pubs" during their duration.

== List of shows and specials labeled as "event television" ==
- "Goodbye, Farewell and Amen" - the final episode of M*A*S*H
- The Day of the Doctor – The 50th anniversary special of Doctor Who which was simulcast globally in November 2013.
- American Idol
- The X Factor
- Must See TV Thursday primetime television lineup
- The Jay Leno Show
- Strictly Come Dancing
- 24: Live Another Day
- Twin Peaks: The Return
- The Sound of Music Live! (December 2013)
- Live from Space: Lap of the Planet (March 2014)

== See also ==
- Event film
- Binge-watching
